= List of amphibious warfare ships =

This is a list of amphibious warfare ships.

== Algeria ==
Algerian National Navy

Active:

- Kalaat Béni Abbès class - LPD
  - Kalaat Béni Abbès (commissioned 2014)
- Kalaat Beni Hammed class - LST
  - Kalaat Beni Hammed 472
  - Kalaat Beni Rached 473

== Argentina ==
Argentine Navy

Decommissioned:

- ARA Cabo San Antonio – tank landing ship
- ARA Cándido de Lasala – dock landing ship

== Australia ==
Royal Australian Navy

Active:

- Canberra class – LHD
  - HMAS Adelaide (commissioned 2015)
  - HMAS Canberra (commissioned 2014)
- Bay class – LSD
  - HMAS Choules (former RFA Largs Bay)

Decommissioned:

- Kanimbla class – LPA (ex-USN Newport-class tank landing ship)
  - HMAS Kanimbla
  - HMAS Manoora
- Round Table class – LSH
  - HMAS Tobruk
- Landing Ship Tank (Mark 3) - LST
  - HMAS LST 3008
  - HMAS LST 3014
  - HMAS Tarakan
  - HMAS LST 3022
  - HMAS Lae
  - HMAS Labuan
- HMAS Jervis Bay Troop transport ship

== Brazil ==
Brazilian Navy

Active:

- Foudre class – LPD
  - Bahia
- Ocean class – LPH
  - Atlântico
- Round Table class - LST
  - Amirante Sabóia
- Newport class - LST
  - Mattoso Maia

Decommissioned:

- Thomaston class - LSD
  - Ceará
  - Rio de Janeiro
- Round Table class - LST
  - Garcia D'Avila

== Canada ==
Proposed (but abandoned):

Decommissioned:

- HMCS Prince David – converted passenger ship
- HMCS Prince Henry – converted passenger ship
- HMCS Prince Robert – converted passenger ship

== Chile ==
Chilean Navy

Active:

- Foudre class – LPD
  - Sargento Aldea
- Bâtiment de transport léger class - LST
  - Rancagua
  - Chacabuco
- Landing Ship Medium (LSM)
  - Elicura

Decommissioned:

- Orompello (1964-2012)
- Newport-class tank landing ship (Chilean service: 1995–2011)
  - Valdivia (ex-USS San Bernardino)
- Maipo Bâtiment de transport léger class (1981-1998)
- Calle Calle - LCU (1978-1982)
- Peuca - LCU (1978-1980)
- Águila (ex-Aventinus, ex-LST-1092) (Chilean service: 1963–1980)- LST-542-class tank landing ship
- Comandante Hemmerdinger (ex-USS New London County) (Chilean service: 1973–1983) - LST-542-class tank landing ship
- Comandante Araya (ex-USS Nye County) (Chilean service: 1973–1981) - LST-542-class tank landing ship
- Comandante Toro (ex-USS LST-277) (Chilean service: 1973–1977) - LST-1-class tank landing ship
- 5 ex USS-LSM: Guardiamarina Contreras (ex-USS LSM-113), Aspirante Isaza (ex-USS LSM-295), Aspirante Goycolea (ex-USS LSM-400), Aspirante Morel (ex-USS LSM-417), Aspirante Morel (ex-USS LSM-444, Aloto). - LSM-1-class landing ships medium.
- 6 ex USS-LCI(L): Eduardo Llanos (ex-USS LCIL 1025), Soldado Canave (ex-USS LCIL 1027), Grumete Tellez (ex-USS LCIL 1072), Grumete Bolados (ex-USS LCIL 1073), Grumete Diaz (ex-USS LCIL 877), Cabo Bustos (ex-USS LCIL 878)
- 3 ex USS-LCM
- 3 ex USS-LCU
- Aquiles Troop transport ship

== China ==
Active:

People's Liberation Army Navy

- Landing helicopter dock (LHD) Type 075 (4 Active)
  - 31 - since 2021, the Hainan
  - 32 - since 2021, the Guangxi
  - 33 - since 2022, the Anhui
  - 34 - since 2025, the Hubei

Amphibious Transport Dock (LPD)

- Type 071 Yuzhao class (8 active)
  - Kunlun Shan (998) - since 2007
  - Jinggang Shan (999) - since 2011
  - Changbai Shan (989) - since 2012
  - Yimeng Shan (988) - since 2016
  - Longhu Shan (980) - since 2018
  - Wuzhi Shan (987) - since 2019
  - Wanyang Shan (986) - since 2019
  - Qilian Shan (985) - since 2020

Landing Ship Tank (LST)

- Type 072II Yuting (3 active, 0 under construction)
- Type 072III Yuting I class (10 active, 0 under construction)
- Type 072A Yuting II class (15 active, 0 under construction)
- Type 074 Yuhai class (12 active, 0 under construction)
- Type 074A Yubei class (10 active, 0 under construction)

Planned:

- Landing helicopter dock (LHD)
  - Type 076 (1 under construction)

Retired: Landing Ship Tank (LST)

- Type 072 Yukan class (3 ships) all ships decommissioned on 2022
- Type 072II Yuting 1 ship 1993-2021

== Egypt ==
Active:

- Mistral class – LHD
  - Gamal Abdel Nasser (commissioned 2 June 2016)
  - Anwar El Sadat (commissioned 16 September 2016)

== France ==
French Navy

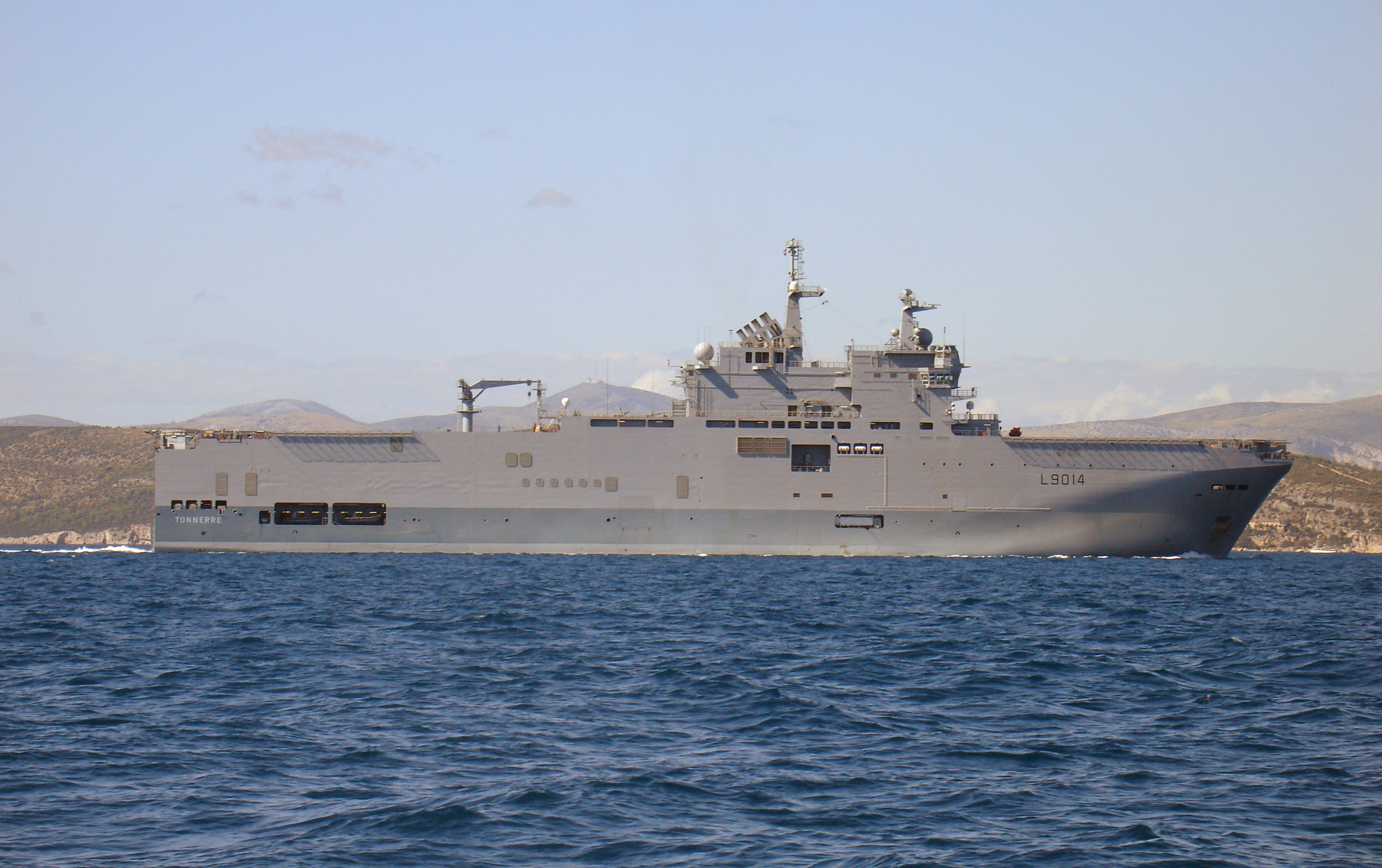
Tonnerre

Active:

- Mistral class (Mistral class) – LHD
  - Mistral (commissioned February 2006)
  - Tonnerre (commissioned December 2006)
  - Dixmude (commissioned December 2011)

Decommissioned:

- BATRAL class (Champlain class) – LST
  - Champlain
  - Francis Garnier
  - Dumont D'Urville
  - Jacques Cartier
  - La Grandière
- Jeanne d'Arc – helicopter cruiser
- Foudre class – LPD
- Ouragan class - LPD

== Greece ==
Hellenic Navy

Active:

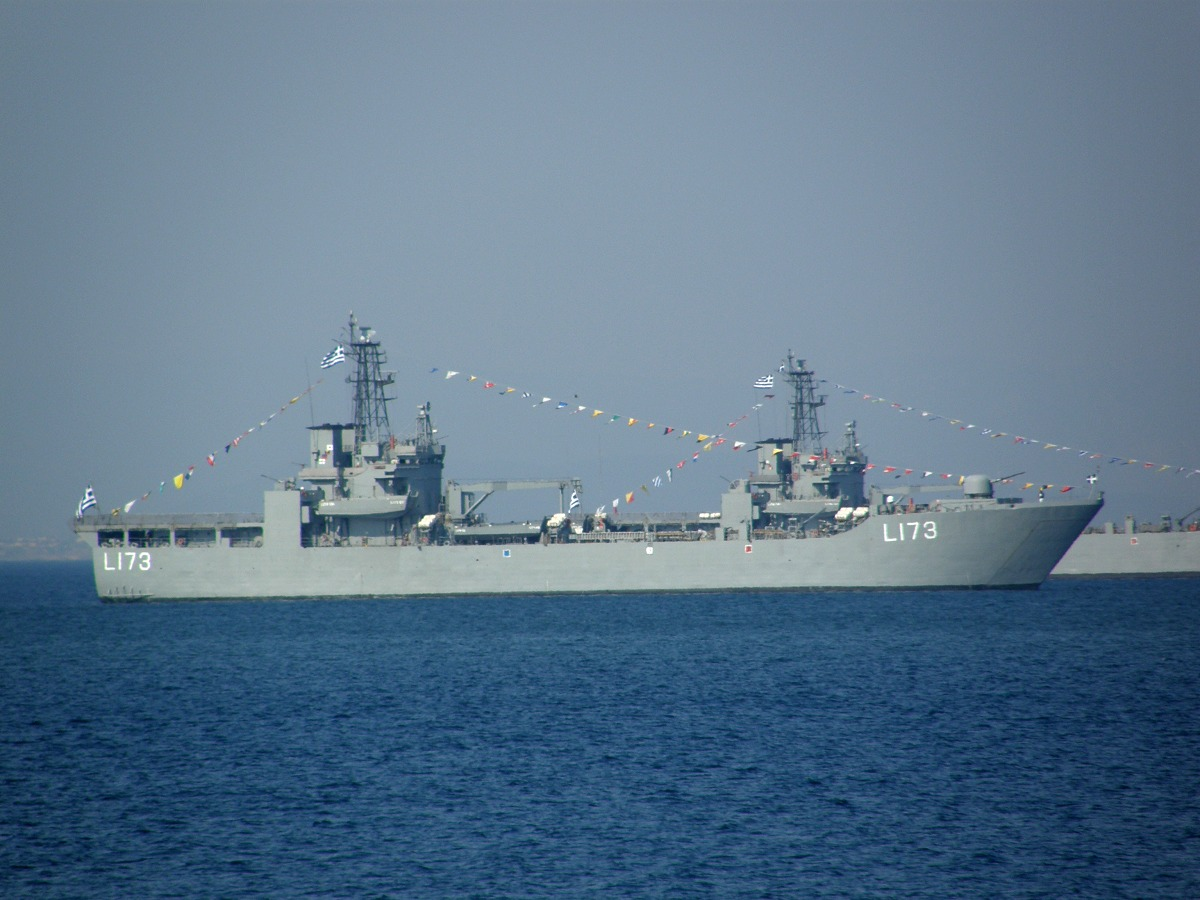
HS Chios

- Jason class - Landing ships
  - HS Chios
  - HS Samos
  - HS Ikaria
  - HS Lesvos
  - HS Rodos
- Zubr class - LCAC
  - HS Kephallenia
  - HS Ithaki
  - HS Kerkyra
  - HS Zakynthos

== India ==
Indian Navy

Planned:

- 4 amphibious assault ships under the Indian Navy Multi-Role Support Vessel programme

Active:

- Austin class - LPD
  - INS Jalashwa (formerly USS Trenton)
- Shardul class - LST (3 in service)
  - INS Shardul (4 January 2007)
  - INS Kesari (5 April 2008)
  - INS Airavat (19 May 2009)
- Magar class (1 in service)
  - INS Gharial (L23) (14 February 1997)
- LCU Mk4 (8 in service)
  - INS LCU 51
  - INS LCU 52
  - INS LCU 53
  - INS LCU 54
  - INS LCU 55
  - INS LCU 56
  - INS LCU 57
  - INS LCU 58

Decommissioned:

- Magar class (1 decommissioned)
  - INS Magar (L20) (15 July 1987 - 06 May 2023)
- Kumbhir class (all 8 decommissioned)
  - INS Mahish (4 June 1985 - 11 November 2016)
  - INS Ghorpad (21 December 1974 – 11 January 2008)
  - INS Kesari (15 August 1975 – 8 May 1999)
  - INS Shardul (24 December 1975 – June 1997)
  - INS Sharabh (27 January 1976 – 15 July 2011)
  - INS Cheetah (30 November 1984 - 12 January 2024)
  - INS Guldar (December 1985 - 12 January 2024)
  - INS Kumbhir (November 1986 - 12 January 2024)
- LCU Mk1 (all (2) decommissioned)
  - INS LCU 31
  - INS LCU 32
- LCU Mk2 (all (3) decommissioned)
  - INS LCU 33
  - INS LCU 34
  - INS LCU 35
- LCU Mk3 (all 4 decommissioned)
  - INS LCU 36
  - INS LCU 37
  - INS LCU 38
  - INS LCU 39

== Indonesia ==
Indonesian Navy

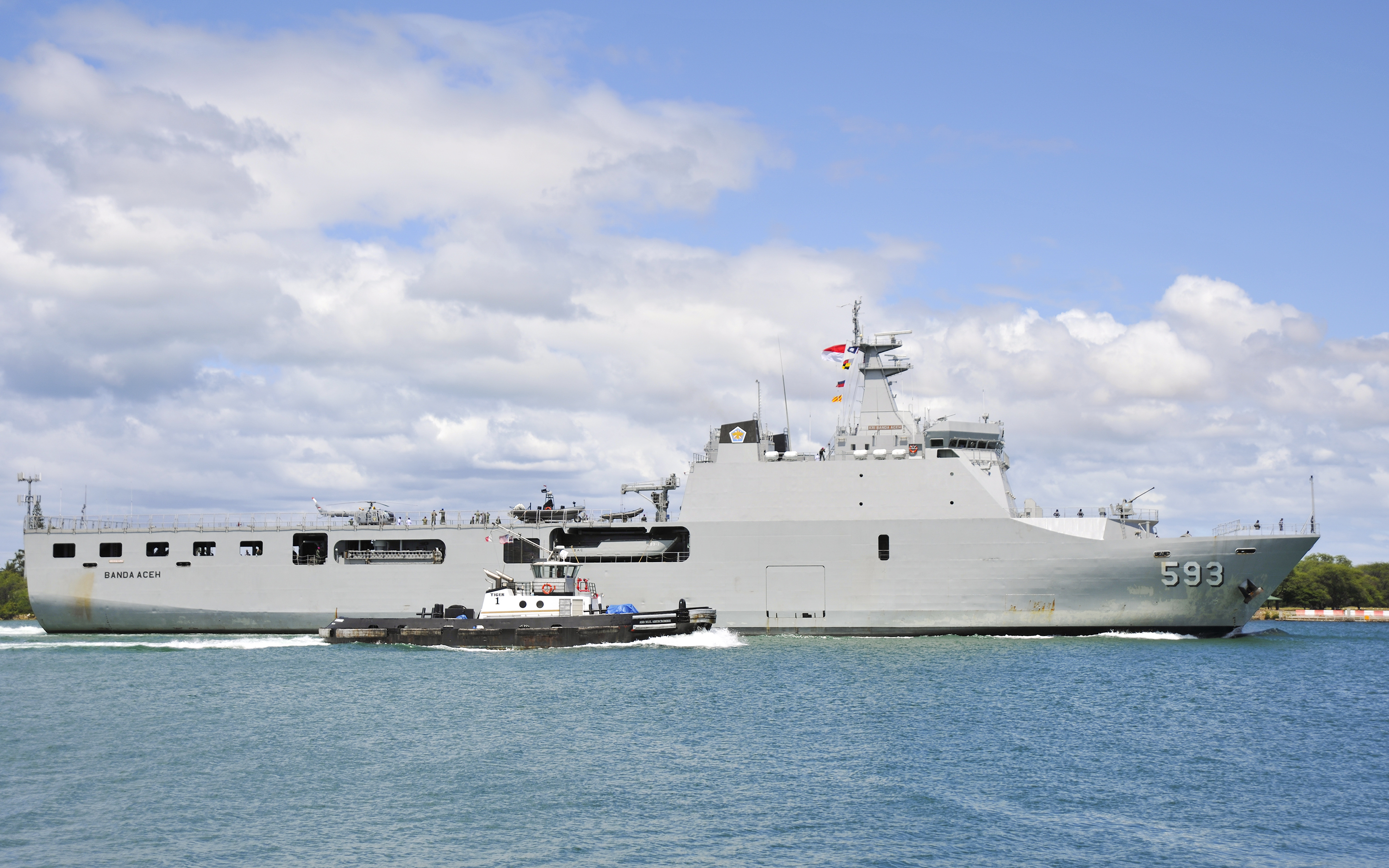
KRI Banda Aceh (593) of Makassar-class LPD

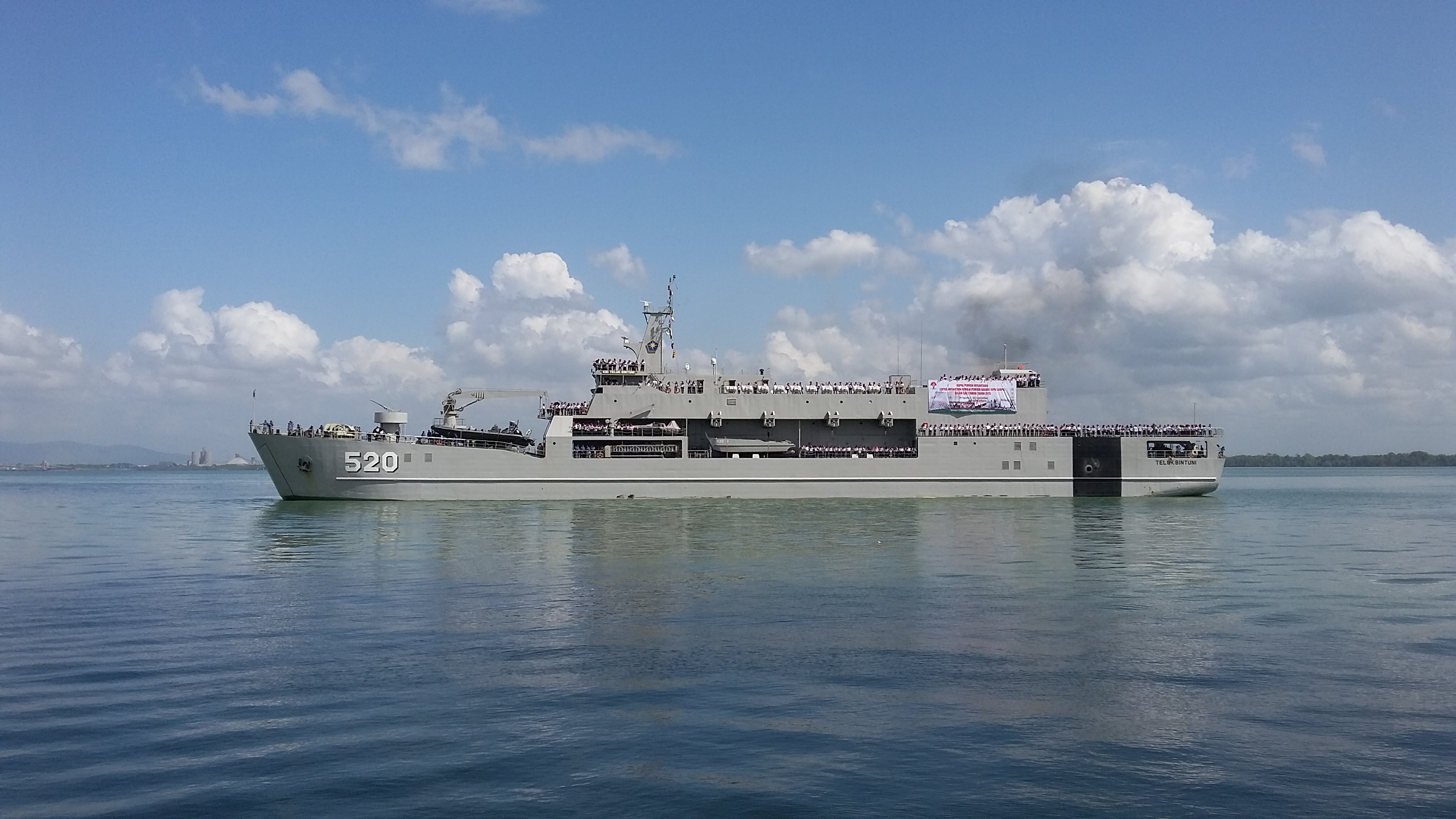
KRI Teluk Bintuni (520), lead ship of her class

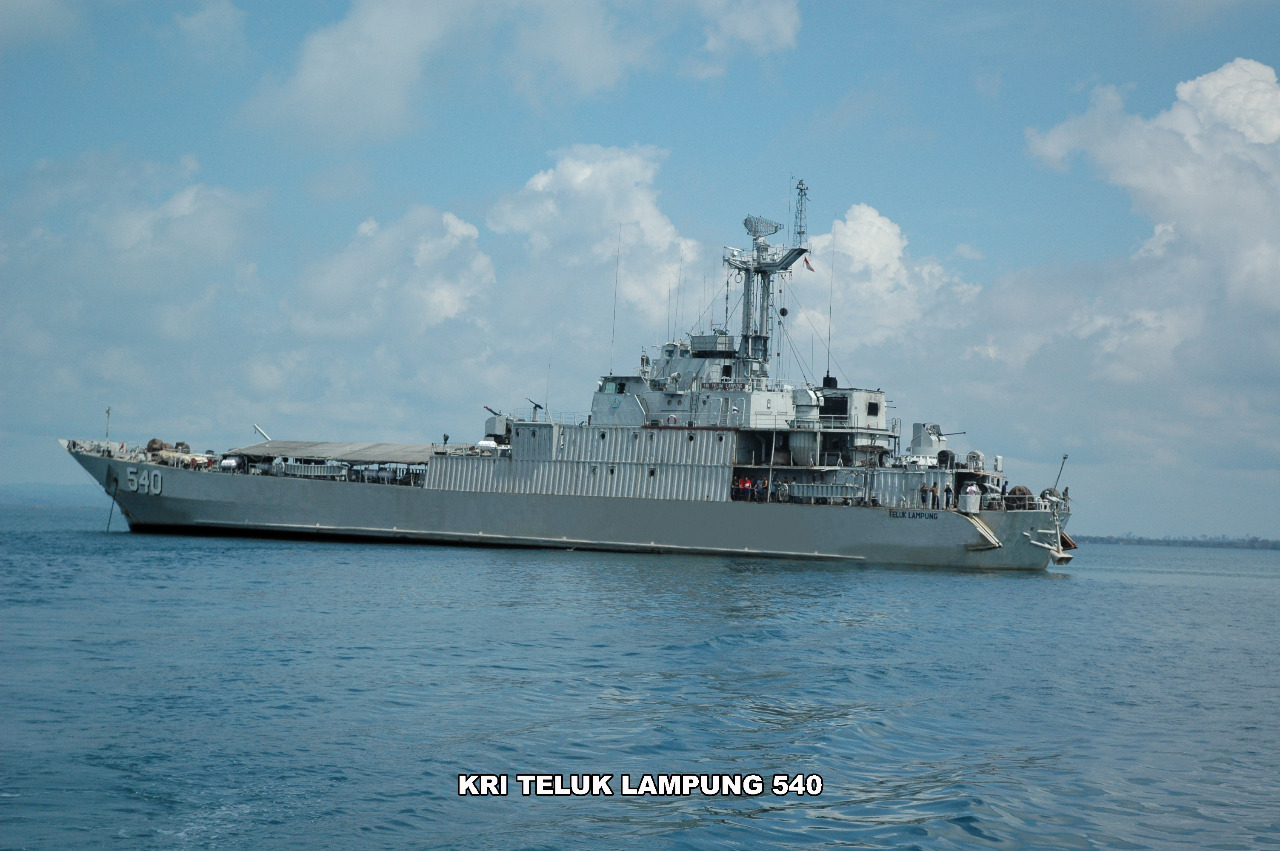
KRI Teluk Lampung (540) of Teluk Gilimanuk-class LSM

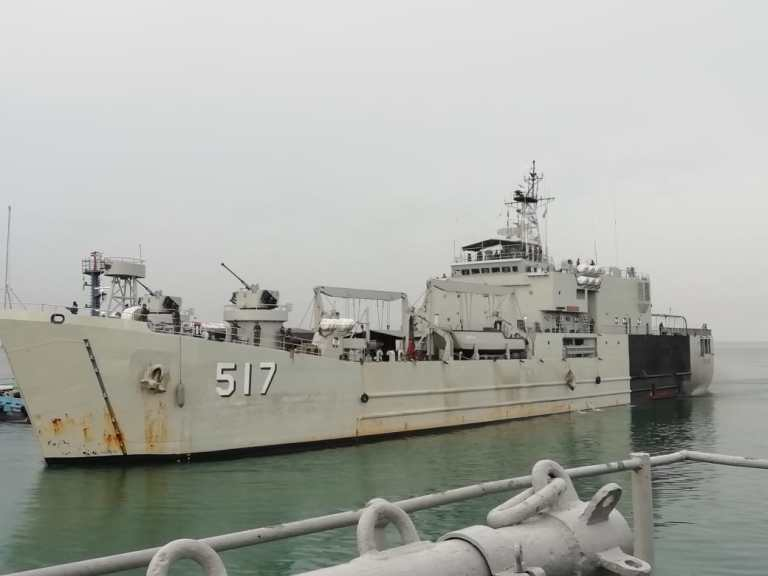
KRI Teluk Ende (517) of Teluk Semangka-class LST

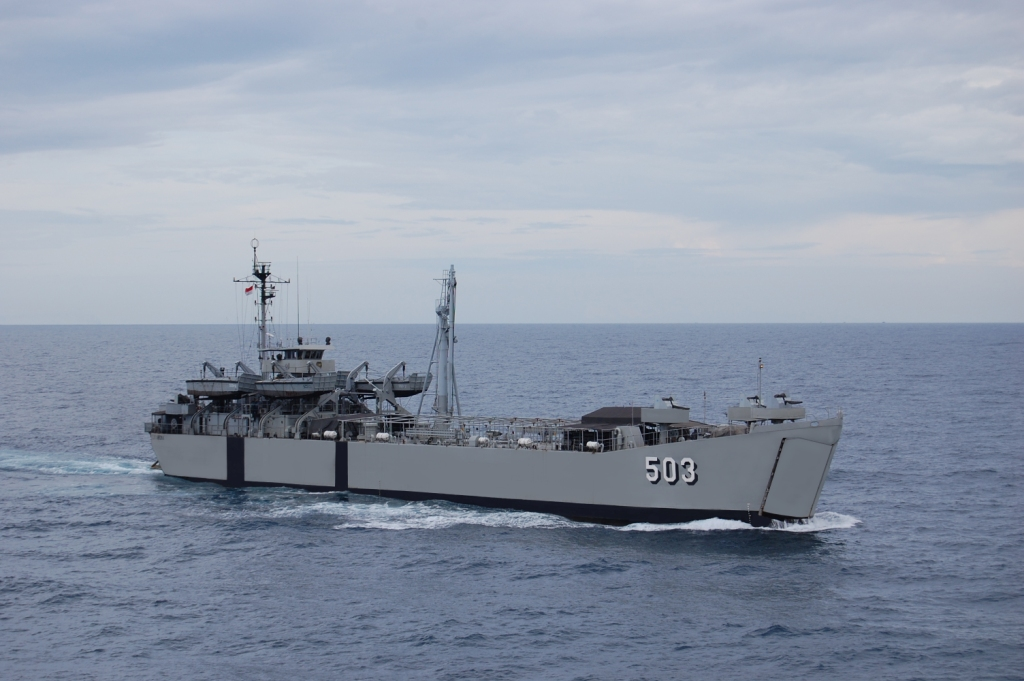
KRI Teluk Amboina (503)

Active:

- Makassar class – LPD
  - KRI Makassar
  - KRI Surabaya
  - KRI Banjarmasin
  - KRI Banda Aceh
  - KRI Semarang
- KRI Tanjung Dalpele – LPD, Later the role for this ship has changed to a hospital ship as KRI dr. Soeharso
- Teluk Bintuni class – LST
  - KRI Teluk Kendari
  - KRI Teluk Kupang
  - KRI Teluk Bintuni
  - KRI Teluk Lada
  - KRI Teluk Youtefa
  - KRI Teluk Palu
  - KRI Teluk Calang
  - KRI Teluk Weda
  - KRI Teluk Wondama
- Teluk Gilimanuk class – LSM
  - KRI Teluk Gilimanuk
  - KRI Teluk Celukan Bawang
  - KRI Teluk Cendrawasih
  - KRI Teluk Sibolga
  - KRI Teluk Manado
  - KRI Teluk Hading
  - KRI Teluk Parigi
  - KRI Teluk Lampung
  - KRI Teluk Sangkulirang
  - KRI Teluk Cirebon
  - KRI Teluk Sabang
- Teluk Semangka class – LST
  - KRI Teluk Mandar
  - KRI Teluk Sampit
  - KRI Teluk Banten
  - KRI Teluk Ende
- LST-542 class – LST
  - KRI Teluk Amboina

Decommissioned:

- Teluk Gilimanuk class – LSM
  - KRI Teluk Berau
  - KRI Teluk Peleng
  - KRI Teluk Jakarta
- Teluk Semangka class – LST
  - KRI Teluk Semangka
  - KRI Teluk Penyu
- Polnocny class – LST
  - KRI Teluk Parigi
- LST-542 class – LST
  - KRI Teluk Langsa
  - KRI Teluk Bayur
  - KRI Teluk Kau
  - KRI Teluk Manado
  - KRI Teluk Ratai
  - KRI Teluk Saleh
  - KRI Teluk Bone
  - KRI Tandjung Nusanive
  - KRI Tandjung Radja
- LST-1 class – LST
  - KRI Teluk Tomini

== Iran ==
Islamic Republic of Iran Navy

Active:

- Hengam class
- Hormuz 21 class
- Hormuz 24 class

Unknown:

- IIS Sohrab

== Italy ==
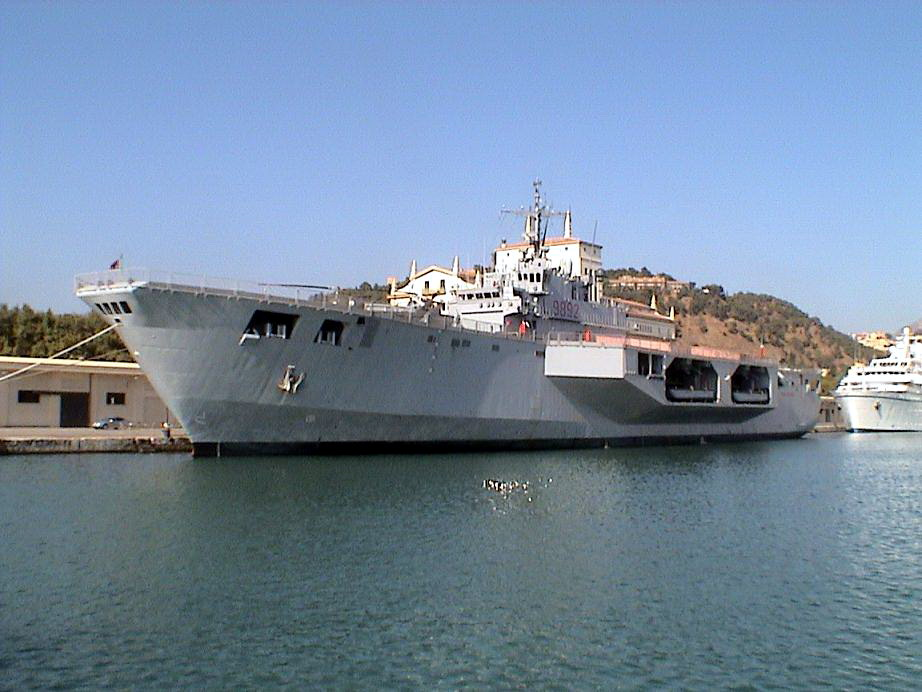
San Giorgio

Italian Navy

Active:

- Trieste - LHD
- San Giorgio class – LPD
  - San Giorgio (commissioned 1988)
  - San Marco (commissioned 1988)
  - San Giusto (commissioned 1994)

Decommissioned:

- De Soto County-class tank landing ship
  - Grado
  - Caorle

== Japan ==
Japan Maritime Self-Defense Force

Active:

- Ōsumi class – LPD
  - JDS Ōsumi (commissioned 1998)
  - JDS Shimokita (commissioned 2002)
  - JDS Kunisaki (commissioned 2003)

Decommissioned:

- Miura class – LST
  - JDS Ojika
  - JDS Satsuma
  - JDS Miura
- Atsumi class – LST
  - JDS Atsumi
  - JDS Motubu
  - JDS Nemuro

Imperial Japanese Navy

Decommissioned or sunk:

- No.1-class landing ship - LST, 21 ships)
- No.101-class landing ship - LST, 49 ships)
- Toku Daihatsu-class landing craft

Imperial Japanese Army

Decommissioned or sunk:

- Shinshū Maru landing craft carrier
- Type C landing craft carriers
  - Akitsu Maru
- M Type C landing craft carriers
  - Kumano Maru
  - Tokitsu Maru
- Type A landing craft carriers
  - Nigitsu Maru
  - Mayasan Maru
  - Tamatsu Maru
- M Type A landing craft carriers
  - Kibitsu Maru
  - Hyūga Maru
  - Settsu Maru
- Type B landing craft carrier
  - Takatsu Maru
- No.101-class landing ship - LST, 20 ships
- SS-class landing ship - LST, 18 or 21 or 22 ships
- Daihatsu-class landing craft
- Shōhatsu-class landing craft

== Myanmar ==
Myanmar Navy

Active:

- Makassar class - LPD
  - UMS Mottama (commissioned 2019)

== Netherlands ==
Royal Netherlands Navy

Active:

- Rotterdam class - LPD
  - HNLMS Rotterdam (commissioned 1998)
  - HNLMS Johan de Witt (commissioned 2007)
- Karel Doorman class - LPD
  - HNLMS Karel Doorman (commissioned 2015)

== New Zealand ==
Royal New Zealand Navy

Planned:

- Defence Capability Plan 2019 stats that the RNZN will procure a Enhance Sealift Vessel (ESV) and be in service around 2029 as well as second to replace HMNZS Canterbury keeping 2 ship amphibious fleet in 2035.

Active:

- HMNZS Canterbury - LPA (commissioned 2007)

Decommissioned:

- HMNZS Charles Upham Decommissioned in July 2001

== Norway ==
Royal Norwegian Navy

Active:

- CB90 class - LCP
- Tjelsund class - LST

== Oman ==
Royal Navy of Oman

Active:

- Nasr al Bahr (L2)

Decommissioned:

- Al Munassir (L1)
- Fulk al Salamah (L3)

== Philippines ==
Philippine Navy

Active:

- Tarlac class - LPD
  - BRP Tarlac
  - BRP Davao del Sur

== Peru ==
Peruvian Navy Active:

- Makassar class - LPD
  - BAP Pisco
  - BAP Paita

Decommissioned:

- Terrebonne Parish class - LST
  - BAP Eten (DT-144)
  - BAP Callao (DT-143)
  - BAP Paita (DT-141)
  - BAP Pisco (DT-142)

== Qatar ==
Qatari Emiri Navy

Active:

- San Giorgio-class amphibious transport dock - LPD
  - QENS Al Fulk (L141)

== Russia/Soviet Union ==
Russian Navy/Soviet Navy

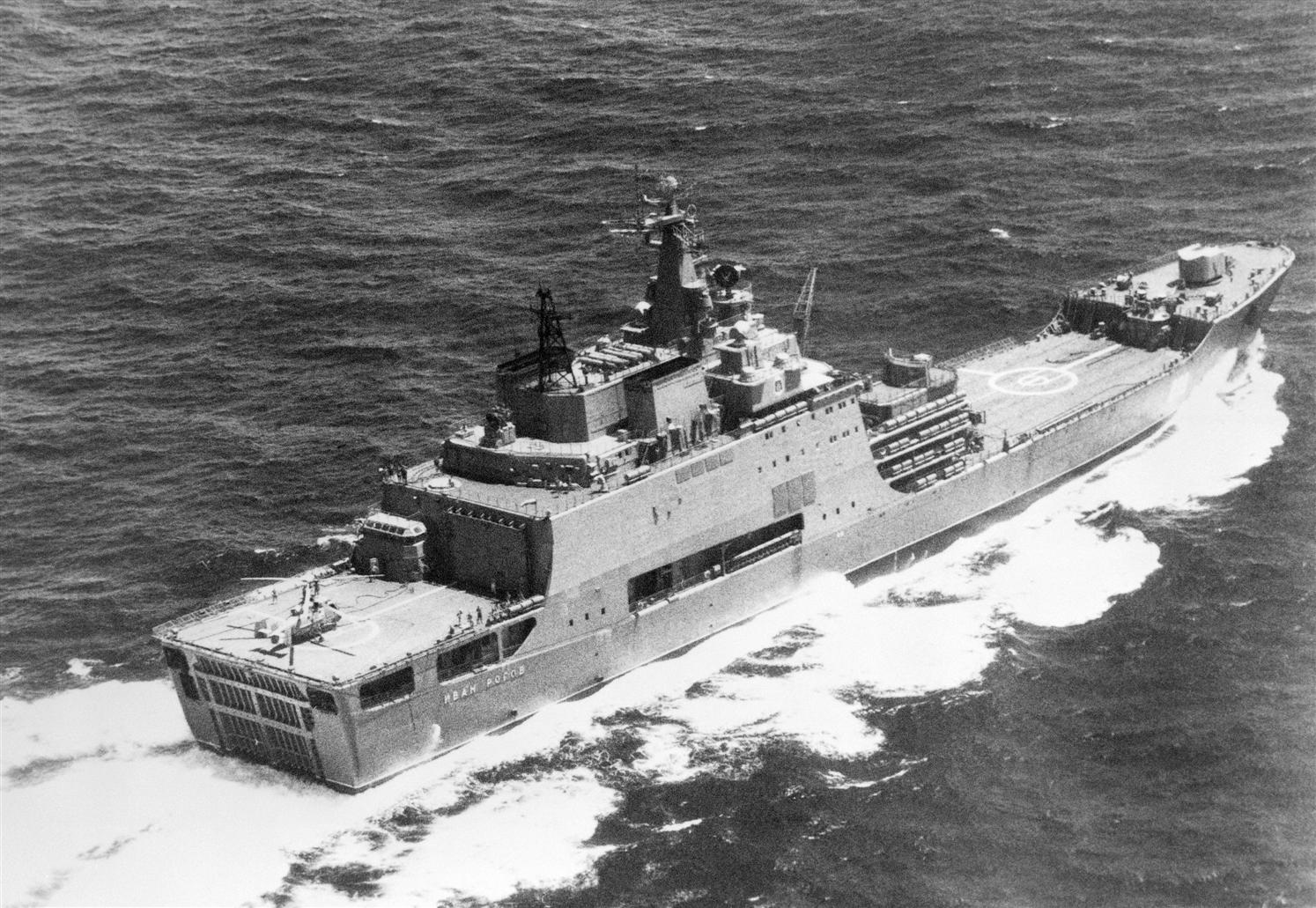
An Ivan Rogov class landing ship, ca. 1985.

Planned:

- Project 23900 amphibious assault ship – LHD (2 ordered)
  - Ivan Rogov
  - Mitrofan Moskalenko
- Ivan Gren class – LSD (2 under construction, 5 planned)
  - Vladimir Andreyev
  - Vasily Trushin

Active:

- Ivan Gren class – LSD (2 active)
  - Ivan Gren
  - Pyotr Morgunov
- Ropucha class – LST (12 active)
  - 9 Project 775 (Ropucha I)
  - 3 Project 775M (Ropucha II)

Decommissioned:

- Ivan Rogov class – LSD
  - Ivan Rogov
  - Mitrofan Moskalenko
  - Aleksandr Nikolayev
- Ropucha class – LST
  - 13 Project 775 (Ropucha I)

== Singapore ==
Republic of Singapore Navy

Active:

- Endurance class – LPD
  - RSS Endurance (207)
  - RSS Resolution (208)
  - RSS Persistence (209)
  - RSS Endeavour (210)

Decommissioned:

- County class – LST
  - RSS Endurance (L201)
  - RSS Excellence (L202)
  - RSS Intrepid (L203)
  - RSS Resolution (L204)
  - RSS Persistence (L205)
- Round Table class – LSL
  - RSS Perseverance (L206)

== South Korea ==
Republic of Korea Navy

Planned

- Dokdo class – LHD
  - Baengnyeong

Active:

- Dokdo class – LHD
  - Dokdo (commissioned 2007)
  - Marado (commissioned 2020)
- Cheon Wang Bong class – LST
  - Cheon Wang Bong
  - Cheon Ja Bong
  - Il Chul Bong
  - No Jeok Bong
- Kojoonbong class – LST
  - Go Jun Bong
  - Bi Ro Bong
  - Hyang Ro Bong
  - Sung In Bong

Decommissioned:

- Un Bong class – LST
  - Bi Bong
  - Tuk Bong
  - Buk Han
  - Kae Bong
  - Hwa San
  - Su Yong
  - Un Bong
  - Wee Bong

== Spain ==
Armada Española

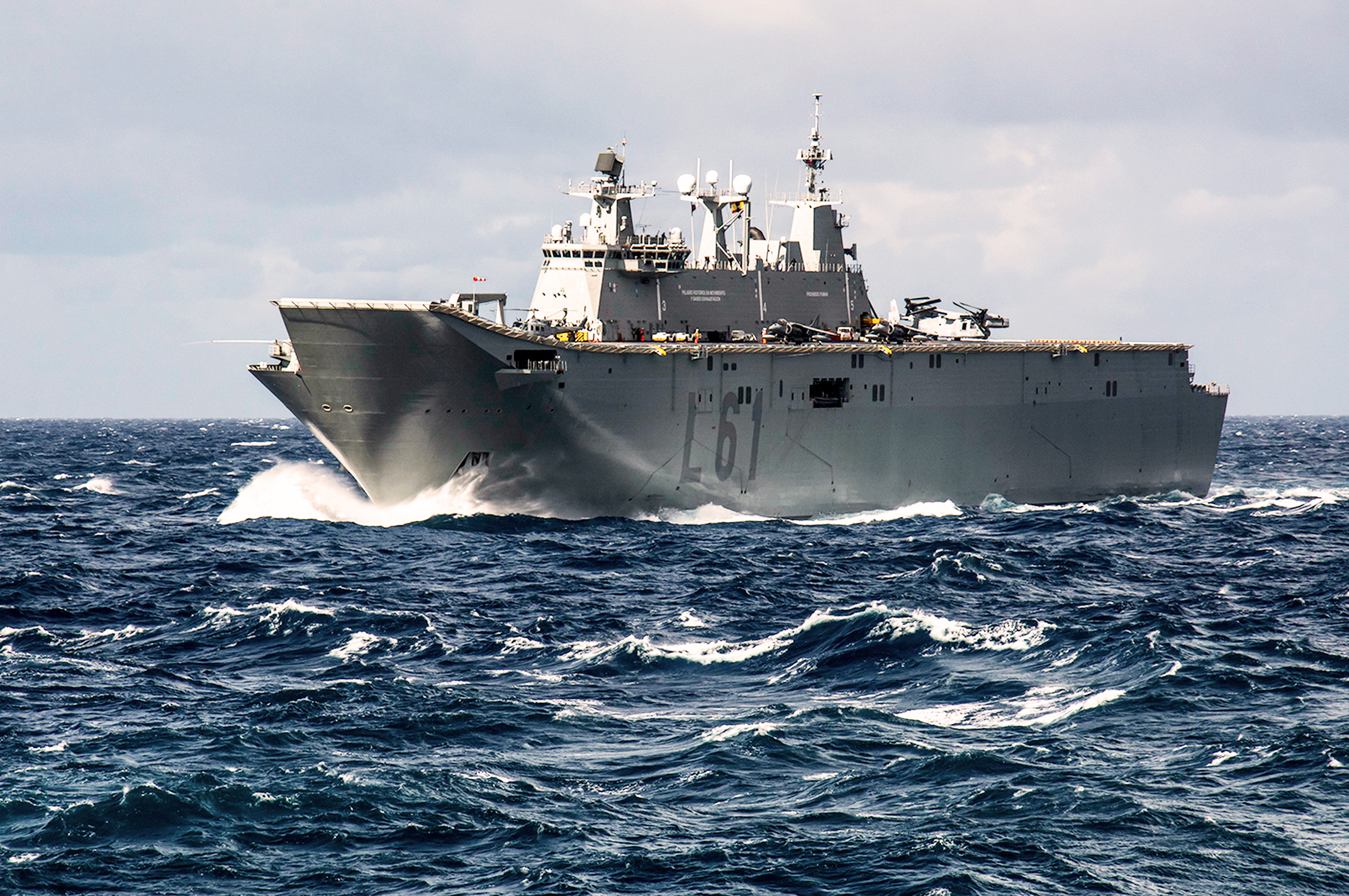
Juan Carlos I (L61) in 2015

Active:

- Galicia class – LPD
  - Galicia (commissioned 1998)
  - Castilla (commissioned 2000)
- Juan Carlos I class – LHD (BPE)
  - Juan Carlos I (commissioned 2010) (universal ship, has the function of fleet carrier and amphibious assault ship)

Decommissioned:

- Hernan Cortes class – LST
  - Hernán Cortés (Ex-USS Harlan County)
  - Pizarro (Ex-USS Barnstable County)
- Haskell class
  - Aragón
- Andromeda class
  - Castilla
- Terrebonne Parish class (LST)
  - Velasco
  - Martín Álvarez
  - Conde de Venadito
- Paul Revere class
  - Castilla
  - Aragón
- Casa Grande class (LSD)
  - Galicia

== Thailand ==
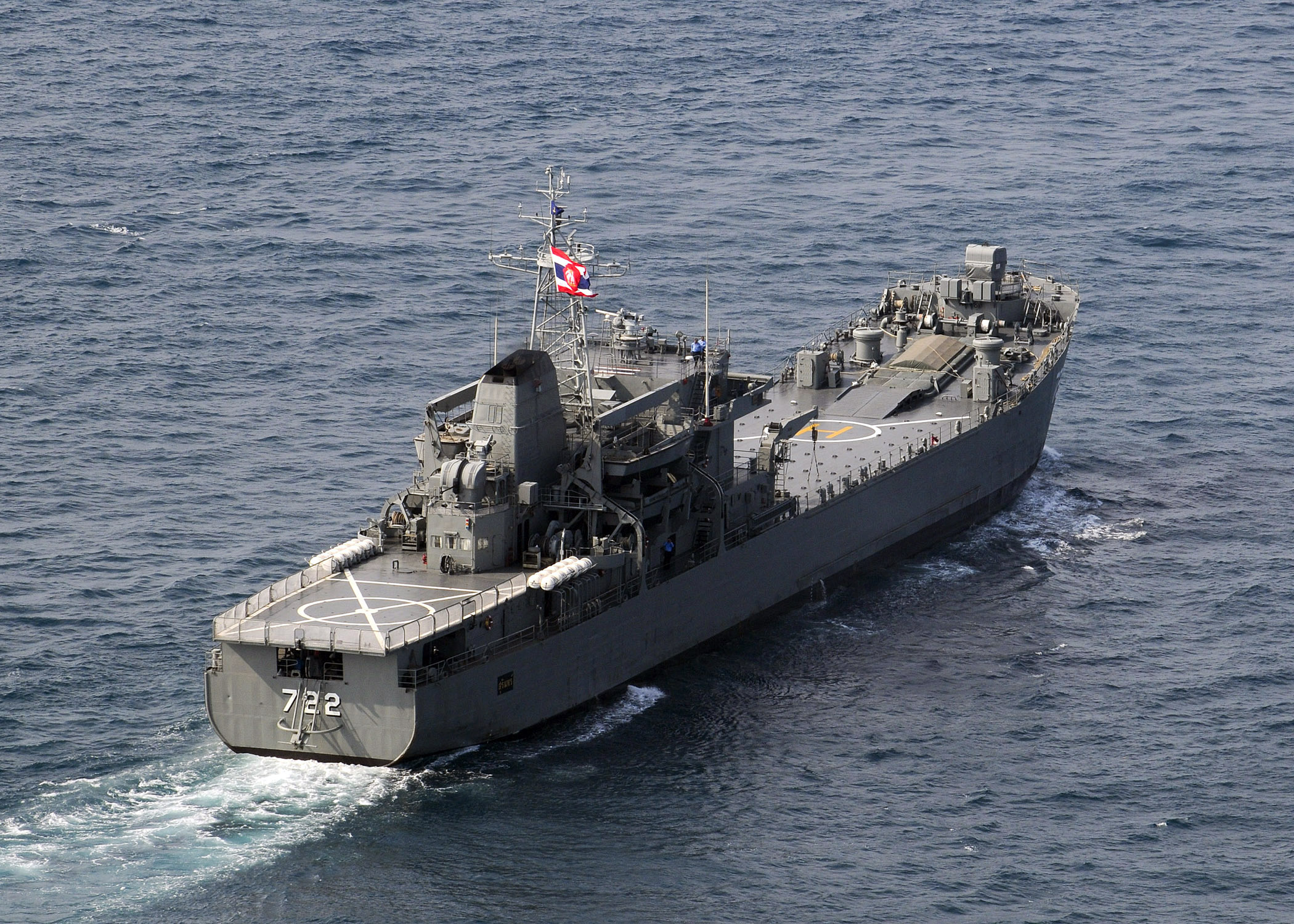
LST HTMS Surin underway in 2010

Royal Thai Navy

Planned:

- Type 071 Yuzhao class - LPD (1 under construction)

Active:

- Endurance class – LPD
  - HTMS Angthong
- modified Príncipe de Asturias class – CVH
  - HTMS Chakri Naruebet (commissioned 1997)
- Normed PS 700 class – LST
  - HTMS Sichang
  - HTMS Surin

Decommissioned:

- LST-542 class – LST
  - HTMS Angthong
  - HTMS Chang
  - HTMS Phangan
  - HTMS Lanta
  - HTMS Prathong

== Turkey ==
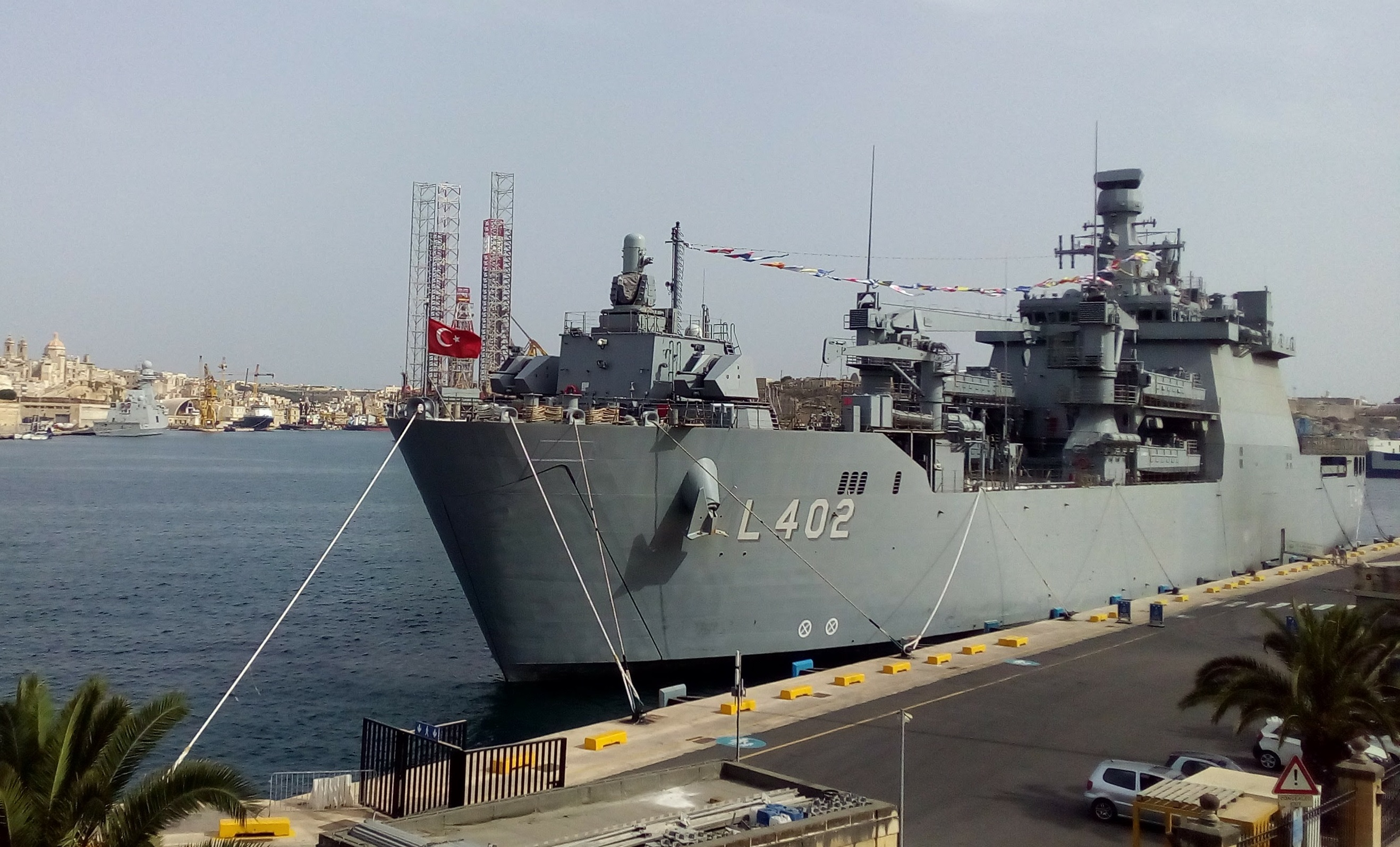
TCG Bayraktar (L-402), Turkish landing ship tank in Valletta Harbour, Malta.

- Juan Carlos I-class amphibious assault ship
  - TCG Anadolu
- Ertuğrul-class landing ship tank
  - TCG Ertuğrul (L-401) - (training ship, ex USS Windham County (LST-1170))
- Osmangazi-class landing ship tank
  - TCG Osmangazi (NL-125)
- Bayraktar-class landing ship tank
  - TCG Bayraktar (L-402)
- Bey-class landing ship tank
  - TCG Sarucabey (NL-123)
  - TCG Karamürsel (NL-124)
- 130-class landing craft
  - TCG Ç-132
  - TCG Ç-138
- 140-class landing craft
  - TCG Ç-140
  - TCG Ç-141
  - TCG Ç-142
  - TCG Ç-143
  - TCG Ç-144
  - TCG Ç-145
  - TCG Ç-146
  - TCG Ç-147
  - TCG Ç-148
  - TCG Ç-149
- 150-class landing craft
  - TCG Ç-150
  - TCG Ç-151
  - TCG Ç-152
  - TCG Ç-153
  - TCG Ç-154
  - TCG Ç-155
  - TCG Ç-156
  - TCG Ç-157
  - TCG Ç-158
- 320-class landing craft
  - TCG Ç-320
  - TCG Ç-321
  - TCG Ç-322
  - TCG Ç-323
  - TCG Ç-324
  - TCG Ç-325
  - TCG Ç-326
  - TCG Ç-327
  - TCG Ç-158
  - TCG Ç-329
  - TCG Ç-330
  - TCG Ç-331

== Taiwan ==
Active:

- Yushan Class – LPD (1 commissioned, 3 additional planned)

Retired:

== United Kingdom ==
Royal Navy

Active:

- RFA Argus – aviation support/littoral strike ship
- Bay class – LSD
  - RFA Lyme Bay
  - RFA Mounts Bay
  - RFA Cardigan Bay

Decommissioned:

- Albion class – LPD
  - HMS Albion
  - HMS Bulwark

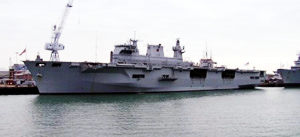
HMS Ocean

- HMS Ocean – LPH
- Centaur-class aircraft carriers – LPH
  - HMS Albion
  - HMS Bulwark
- Colossus class - Commando carrier ships
  - Ocean
  - Theseus
- Fearless class – LPD
  - HMS Fearless
  - HMS Intrepid
- Round Table class – LSL
  - RFA Sir Geraint
  - RFA Sir Lancelot
  - RFA Sir Percivale
- Maracaibo class - LST
  - HMS Misoa
  - HMS Tasajera
  - HMS Bachaquero
- Boxer class - LST
  - HMS Boxer
  - HMS Bruiser
  - HMS Thruster
- LST Mk.3 class
- LST 3001
- LST 3002
- LST 3003 Anzio
- LST 3004
- LST 3005
- LST 3006 Tromsø
- LST 3007
- LST 3008
- LST 3009
- LST 3010 Attacker
- LST 3011 Avenger
- LST 3012 Ben Nevis
- LST 3013 Ben Lomond
- LST 3014
- LST 3015 Battler
- LST 3016 Dieppe
- LST 3017
- LST 3018
- LST 3019 Vaagso
- LST 3020
- LST 3021
- LST 3022
- LST 3023
- LST 3024
- LST 3025 Bruiser
- LST 3026 Charger
- LST 3027 Lofoten
- LST 3028
- LST 3029 Chaser
- LST 3031
- LST 3033
- LST 3035
- LST 3036 Puncher
- LST 3037
- LST 3038 Fighter
- LST 3042 Hunter
- LST 3041 Hull
- LST 3043 Messina
- LST 3044 Narvik
- LST 3501
- LST 3502
- LST 3503
- LST 3504 Pursuer
- LST 3505 Ravager
- LST 3506
- LST 3507
- LST 3508 Searcher
- LST 3509
- LST 3510 Slinger
- LST 3511 Reggio
- LST 3512
- LST 3513 Salerno
- LST 3514 Smiter
- LST 3515 Stalker
- LST 3516 Striker
- LST 3517 St Nazaire
- LST 3518 Suvla
- LST 3519
- LST 3520 Thruster
- LST 3522 Tracker
- LST 3523 Trouncer
- LST 3524 Trumpeter
- LST 3525 Walcheren
- LST 3532 Zeebrugge
- LST 3534

== Venezuela ==
Bolivarian Navy of Venezuela

Planned:

- Los Frailes class (Damen Stan Lander 5612) Roll-on/Roll-off medium vessels capable of beaching - AKR
  - (up to 8 ships with hull prefix "T", ship names and hull numbers yet to be determined)

Active:

- Capana class (Korea Tacoma Alligator MK.III) – LST
  - T-61 AB Capana
  - T-62 AB Esequibo
  - T-63 AB Goajira
  - T-64 AB Los Llanos
- Los Frailes class (Damen Stan Lander 5612) Roll-on/Roll-off medium vessels capable of beaching - AKR
  - T-91 AB Los Frailes
  - T-92 AB Los Testigos
  - T-93 AB Los Roques
  - T-94 AB Los Monjes
- Margarita class (Swiftships model 130LS0791) Landing Craft Utility – LCU
  - T-71 AB Margarita
  - T-72 AB La Orchila

Decommissioned:

- Capana class (Bethlehem-Hingham Shipyard LST-542 class) landing ship tank – LST
  - T-11 FNV Capana (ex-LST-907) (Venezuelan service: 1946–1957)
- Capana class (Ingalls Shipbuilding Terrebonne Parish-class) landing ship tank – LST
  - T-21 ARV Amazonas (ex-USS Vernon County, ex-LST-1161) (Venezuelan service: 1973–1977)
- Los Monjes class (LSM-1class) landing ship Medium – LSM
  - T-13 ARV Los Monjes (ex-LSM-548) (Venezuelan service: 1959–1979)
  - T-14 ARV Los Roques (ex-LSM-543) (Venezuelan service: 1959–1965)
  - T-15 ARV Los Frailes (ex-LSM-544) (Venezuelan service: 1959–1986)
  - T-16 ARV Los Testigos (ex-LSM-545) (Venezuelan service: 1960–1979)
  - No Name (ex-LSM-542) (Transferred, 15 July 1959, to Venezuela, for cannibalization)
- Guayana class (LST-1151/Achelous Class) landing ship tank – LST / Landing Craft Repair Ship - ARL
  - T-18 / T-31 ARV Guayana (ex-USS Quirinus, ex-LST-1151/ex-ARL-39) (Venezuelan service: 1962-??)

== Vietnam ==
Vietnam People's Navy

Active:

- Tran Khanh Du (HQ-501) ex-USS Maricopa County (LST-938)
- Polnocny class - LST
  - HQ-511
  - HQ-512
- HQ-521

== Abbreviations ==
- LHA = Landing Helicopter Assault
- LHD = Landing Helicopter Dock
- LPD = Landing Platform Dock
- LPH = Landing Platform Helicopter
- LSD = Landing Ship Dock
- LSH = Landing Ship Heavy
- LSL = Landing Ship Logistics
- LST = Landing Ship Tank

== See also ==
- Amphibious assault ship
- Amphibious warfare ship
- List of aircraft carriers in service
- List of amphibious warfare vessels of World War II
