= Wexford County =

Wexford County may refer to:

== Places ==
- Wexford County, Michigan
- County Wexford, Ireland

== Ships ==
- USS LST-1168, a United States Navy landing ship tank commissioned in 1954 and renamed USS Wexford County (LST-1168) in 1955
- USS Wexford County (LST-1168), a United States Navy landing ship tank in commission from 1954 to 1971
- USS Wexford (AK-220)
