= HMAS Tarakan =

Two ships of the Royal Australian Navy have been named HMAS Tarakan after the town of Tarakan in Borneo and the Allied recapture of this town in 1945.

- HMAS Tarakan (L3017), a Mark III tank landing ship commissioned in 1946 and serving until 1954, when she was sold for scrap
- HMAS Tarakan (L 129), a Balikpapan-class heavy landing craft laid down in 1971, and decommissioned in 2014

== Battle honours ==
Ships named HMAS Tarakan are entitled to carry a single battle honour:

- East Timor 1999–2000
