= Type 072A landing ship =

Warfare ship

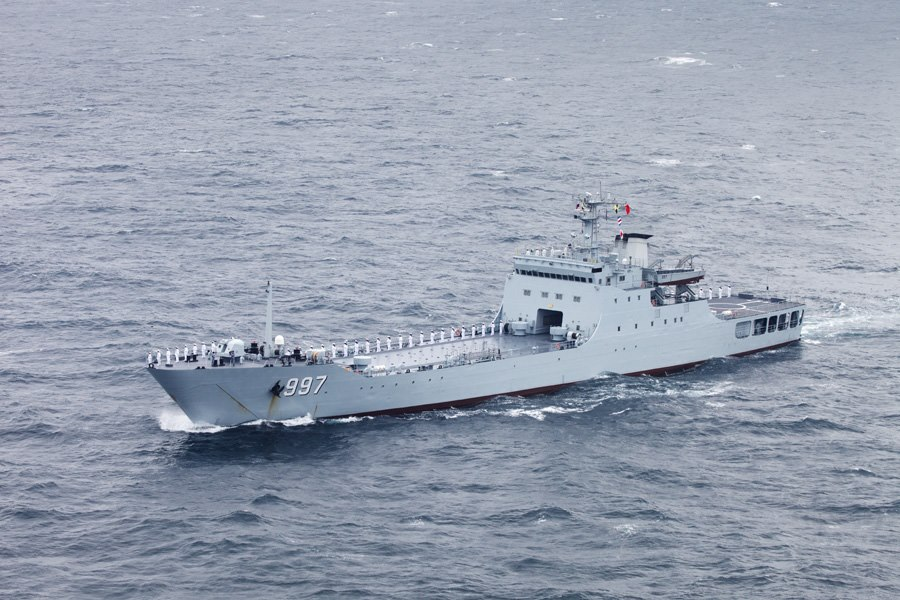

History

China
- Namesake: Mountains of China
- Builder: Dalian Shipyard; Fujian shipyard; Zhonghua Shipyard; Wuhan Shipyard

Class overview
- Name: Type 072A Landing Ship Tank
- Operators: People's Liberation Army Navy
- Preceded by: Type 072III landing ship
- Completed: 15
- Active: 15

General characteristics
- Type: Landing Ship Tank
- Displacement: 3,770t (standard), 4,800t (full)
- Length: 120m (394 ft)
- Beam: 16.4m (54 ft)
- Draft: 3.2m (10.5 ft)
- Propulsion: Two diesel engines, two shafts
- Speed: 17 knots (31 km/h; 20 mph)
- Range: 3000 nm @ 14 kt
- Capacity: 10 armoured vehicles
- Troops: 250
- Complement: 120
- Armament: 1 xtwin 37 mm guns (Batch 1); 1 x H/PJ-17 30 mm gun (Batch 2)
- Aviation facilities: Helipad for two medium helicopters

The Type 072A landing ship (NATO/OSD Yuting II-class landing ship tank) is a class of amphibious warfare ship in the Chinese People's Liberation Army Navy.

== Design and construction ==
The Type 072A is a development of the Type 072II or Type 072III landing ships. A tunnel through the superstructure connects the forward and rear decks. The vehicle deck runs the full length of the ship with bow doors and stern ramp.

The first nine ships entered service from 2003 to 2005. They were completed with a twin 37mm turret.

A second batch - reportedly of four ships from Wuchang shipyard and two from Fujian shipyard - began entering service in 2015. The 37mm guns were replaced by a H/PJ-17 30 mm gun on the second batch.

== Ships of the class ==
Pennant number	Name	Namesake	Batch	Builder	Launched	Commissioned	Fleet	Status
911	天柱山 / Tianzhu Shan	Mount Tianzhu	Batch 1	Dalian	1 July 2003	2004	North Sea Fleet	Active
912	大青山 / Daqing Shan	Mount Daqing	Batch 1	Dalian	September 2003	2004	North Sea Fleet	Active
913	八仙山 / Baxian Shan	Eight Immortals Mountain	Batch 1	Zhonghua	23 April 2003	October 2003	East Sea Fleet	Active
914	武夷山 / Wuyi Shan	Wuyi Mountains	Batch 2	Fujian	6 February 2015	7 March 2016	East Sea Fleet	Active
915	徂徕山 / Culai Shan	Mount Culai	Batch 2	Fujian	June 2015	7 March 2016	East Sea Fleet	Active
916	天目山 / Tianmu Shan	Tianmu Mountain	Batch 2	Wuhan	28 July 2015	2016		Active
917	五台山 / Wutai Shan	Mount Wutai	Batch 2	Fujian		7 March 2016	East Sea Fleet	Active
981	大别山 / Dabie Shan	Dabie Mountains	Batch 2	Wuhan	29 September 2014	23 May 2015		Active
982	太行山 / Taihang Shan	Taihang Mountains	Batch 2	Wuhan	28 December 2014	21 October 2015		Active
992	华顶山 / Huading Shan	Huading Mountain	Batch 1	Wuhan	June 2003	2004	South Sea Fleet	Active
993	罗霄山 / Luoxiao Shan	Luoxiao Mountains	Batch 1	Zhonghua	18 July 2003	2004	South Sea Fleet	Active
994	戴云山 / Daiyun Shan	Daiyun Mountains	Batch 1	Wuhan	16 December 2003	2004	South Sea Fleet	Active
995	万羊山 / Wanyang Shan	Mount Wanyang	Batch 1	Zhonghua	26 November 2003	2004	South Sea Fleet	Active
996	老铁山 / Laotie Shan	Mount Laotie	Batch 1	Dalian	1 January 2004	2004	South Sea Fleet	Active
997	云雾山 / Yunwu Shan	Yunwu Mountain	Batch 1	Wuhan	2004	2005		Active

== See also ==
Equivalent landing ships of the same era

- Go Jun Bong class
- Shardul class
