= HMAS Lae (L3035) =

1944 LST(3)-class tank landing ship

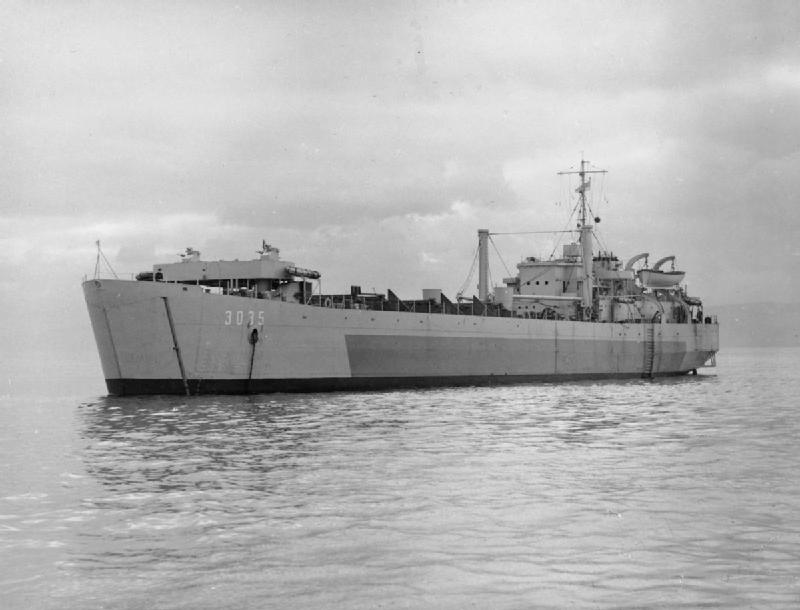
- HMS LST 3035 during World War II

History

United Kingdom
- Name: LST 3035
- Builder: William Denny and Brothers, Dumbarton, Scotland
- Launched: 24 October 1944
- Fate: Transferred to the Royal Australian Navy, 1 July 1946

History

Australia
- Name: Lae
- Namesake: Lae, New Guinea
- Acquired: 1 July 1946
- Commissioned: 15 July 1946
- Fate: Ran aground on South Percy Island and abandoned, 3 November 1956

General characteristics
- Type: Mark III Landing Ship, Tank
- Displacement: 2,300 long tons (2,337 t)
- Length: 347 ft (106 m)
- Beam: 55 ft 3 in (16.84 m)
- Draught: 12 ft 6 in (3.81 m)
- Speed: 13.5 knots (25.0 km/h; 15.5 mph)
- Complement: 104
- Armament: 10 × 20 mm (0.79 in) anti-aircraft guns

HMAS Lae (L3035) was a Landing Ship, Tank which was operated by the Royal Navy and Royal Australian Navy (RAN). She was built by William Denny and Brothers at Dumbarton, Scotland during World War II and was launched on 24 October 1944.

She served with the Royal Navy as HMS LST 3035 until 1 July 1946 when she was transferred to the RAN and commissioned as HMAS Lae. She saw almost no service with the RAN, however, as she was placed in reserve later in 1946 and was not reactivated.

HMAS Lae was sold for scrapping in Hong Kong on 9 November 1955. Lae and the former HMAS Labuan left Sydney under tow for Hong Kong on 28 October 1956 carrying a load of scrap metal. On 3 November Lae ran aground on South Percy Island off the coast of Queensland and was abandoned after an attempt to recover her cargo failed.
