= Type 072III landing ship =

Chinese ship class introduced in the 1990s

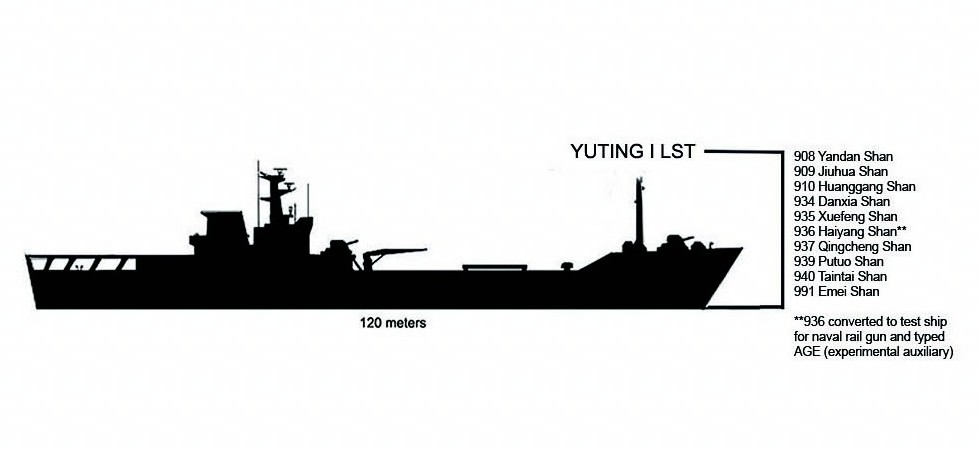

Class overview
- Builders: Hudong–Zhonghua Shipbuilding
- Operators: People's Liberation Army Navy
- Preceded by: Type 072II
- Succeeded by: Type 072A
- Completed: 11
- Active: 11

General characteristics
- Type: Landing Ship, Tank
- Displacement: 7,000 tonnes
- Length: 119.5 m (392 ft)
- Beam: 16.4 m (54 ft)
- Draft: 2.8 m (9 ft 2 in)
- Installed power: 2 × 12PA6V-280MPC diesel at 7,080 kW (9,490 hp)
- Speed: 18 knots (33 km/h; 21 mph)
- Range: 3,000 nmi (5,600 km; 3,500 mi) at 14 knots (26 km/h; 16 mph)
- Capacity: 10 × tanks or; 500 tons of cargo or; 250 fully equipped troops
- Complement: 104
- Armament: 3 × H/PJ76F twin 37mm
- Aviation facilities: helicopter platform

The Type 072III landing ship (NATO designation Yuting-I class) is the follow-on of the Type 072II landing ships initially introduced in the 1990s by the People's Republic of China. Type 072-III features a redesigned concealed bridge, and possibly enhanced sealift capability. The main difference between Type 072III and its predecessor Type 072II is that Type 072III incorporates a helicopter platform at stern (no hangar). A total of eleven ships have entered service with People's Liberation Army Navy (PLAN), and all of them were built by China Shipbuilding Shipyard (中华造船厂) in Shanghai. 6 Type 072III are deployed in PLAN South Sea Fleet (SSF), and the remaining are deployed in PLAN East Sea Fleet (ESF).

== Ships of the class ==
Number	Pennant Number	Name	Builder	Launched	Commissioned	Fleet	Status
1	991	峨眉山 / Emei Shan	Zhonghua		September 1992	South Sea Fleet	Active
2	934	丹霞山 / Danxia Shan	Zhonghua		September 1995	South Sea Fleet	Active
3	935	雪峰山 / Xuefeng Shan	Zhonghua		December 1995	South Sea Fleet	Active
4	936	海洋山 / Haiyang Shan	Zhonghua		May 1996	South Sea Fleet	Active
5	937	青城山 / Qingcheng Shan	Zhonghua		August 1996	South Sea Fleet	Active
6	938	呂梁山 / Luliang Shan	Zhonghua		August 1996	South Sea Fleet	Active
7	908	雁荡山 / Yandang Shan	Zhonghua		January 1997	East Sea Fleet	Active
8	909	九华山 / Jiuhua Shan	Zhonghua		April 2000	East Sea Fleet	Active
9	939	普陀山 / Putuo Shan	Zhonghua		August 2000	East Sea Fleet	Active
10	910	黄岗山 / Huanggang Shan	Zhonghua		December 2001	East Sea Fleet	Active
11	940	天台山 / Tiantai Shan	Zhonghua		April 2002	East Sea Fleet	Active

== Possible railgun testing ==
In February 2018, images were released via electronic media of Haiyang Shan (936). the fourth ship of the class, with what appeared to be a railgun mounted on the ship's bow. Later reports confirmed it was rail-gun being used for dock-side testing. The Chinese have since made a "break-through" in power-generation and are now planning for sea-trials.

== See also ==
- People's Liberation Army Navy Surface Force
- List of active People's Liberation Army Navy ships
