= HMAS LST 3008 =

1944 LST(3)-class tank landing ship

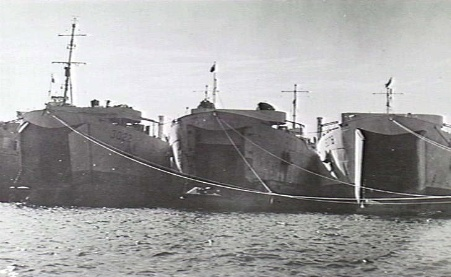
- HMAS LST 3008 (at right) in 1946

History

United Kingdom / Australia
- Builder: Harland & Wolff, Belfast, United Kingdom
- Launched: 31 October 1944
- Commissioned: 1 July 1946 (into RAN)
- Decommissioned: 1948?
- Out of service: to reserve 1948
- Fate: Scrapped during the 1950s

General characteristics
- Displacement: 2,300 tons
- Length: 347 ft (106 m)
- Beam: 55 ft 3 in (16.84 m)
- Draught: 12 ft 6 in (3.81 m)
- Speed: 13.5 knots (25.0 km/h; 15.5 mph)
- Armament: 10 × 20mm anti-aircraft guns

HMAS LST 3008 was a landing ship tank which was briefly operated by the Royal Navy and Royal Australian Navy (RAN). She was built at Harland & Wolff in Belfast during World War II and was launched on 31 October 1944. She served with the Royal Navy as HMS LST 3008 until 1 July 1946 when she was transferred to the RAN. She was used as a transport in RAN service until 1948 when she was placed in reserve. HMAS LST 3008 was sold for scrap on 4 June 1950 and was scrapped in Sydney in the 1950s.
