= USS Paul Revere =

Former US Navy attack transport ship

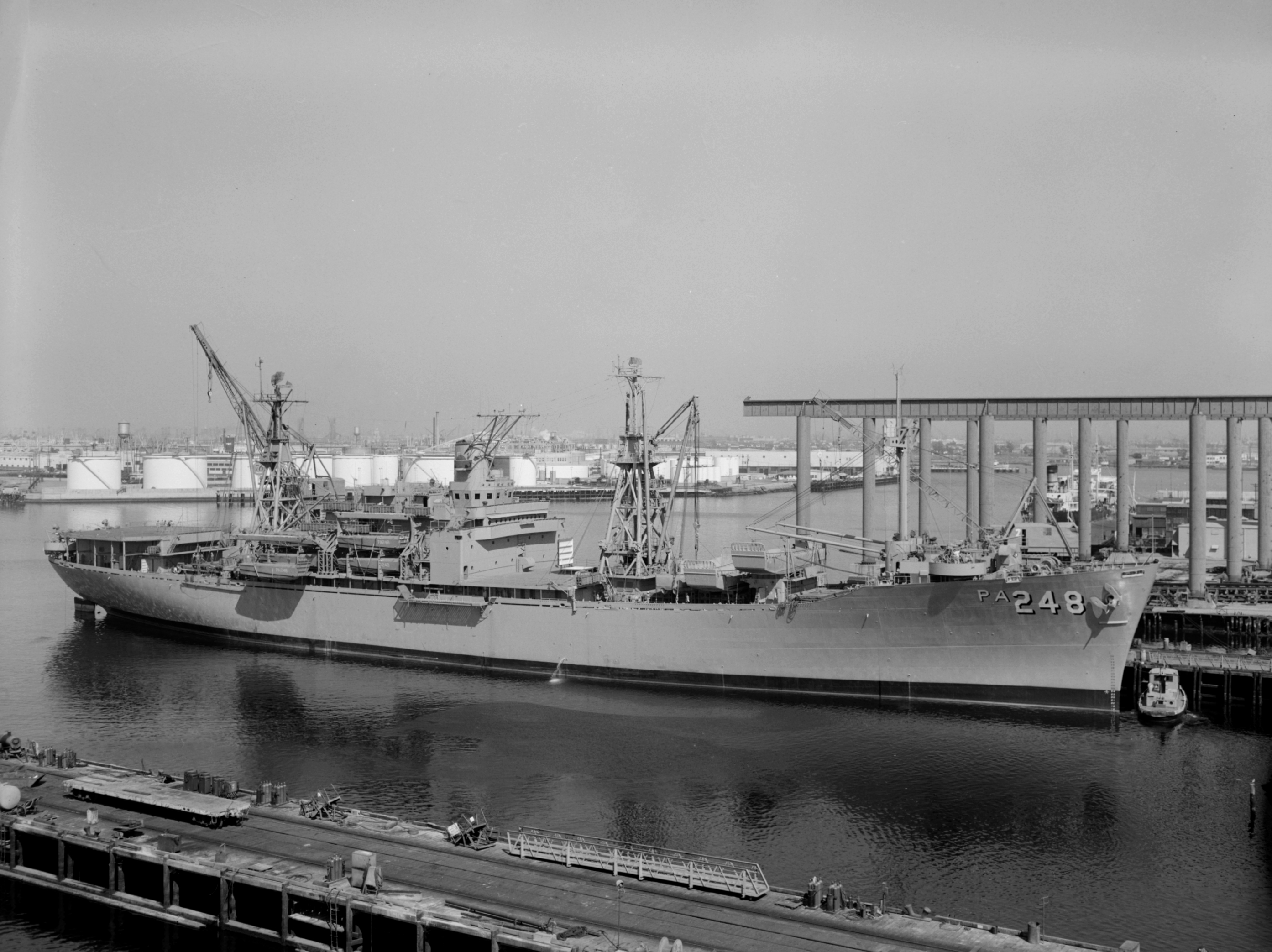
- USS Paul Revere

History

United States
- Name: USS Paul Revere
- Builder: New York Shipbuilding Corp., Camden, New Jersey;
- Laid down: 15 May 1952
- Launched: 11 April 1953, as SS Diamond Mariner
- Acquired: by the USN, 14 September 1956
- Commissioned: 9 October 1958
- Decommissioned: 1 January 1980
- Renamed: Paul Revere, 4 June 1957
- Reclassified: APA-248, 4 June 1957; LPA-248, 1 January 1969
- Stricken: 1 January 1980
- Fate: Sold to Spain, 17 January 1980

Spain
- Name: Castilla
- Acquired: 17 January 1980
- Decommissioned: 6 June 1998
- Identification: L-21
- Fate: Scrapped 2000

General characteristics
- Class & type: Paul Revere-class attack transport
- Displacement: 16,828 long tons (17,098 t)
- Length: 563 ft 6 in (171.75 m)
- Beam: 76 ft (23 m)
- Draft: 27 ft (8.2 m)
- Propulsion: Geared turbine, 19,250 hp (14,350 kW); 2 × Foster Wheeler boilers, 620 psi (4,300 kPa) PSI; Single screw
- Speed: 20 knots (37 km/h; 23 mph)
- Troops: 1500
- Complement: 414
- Armament: 4 × 3"/50 caliber guns
- Aircraft carried: Up to 8 helicopters (Sikorsky HO4S and Sikorsky H-34 have landed on the deck)
- Aviation facilities: elevated aft flight deck
- Notes: “Was set on fire by seaman crossing from Hawaii to Long Beach California taking over 12 hours to put out. It started by seaman using an excelerant on the life preservers.” Witnessed by myself (MSSN Glen Pollard) and others on board.

USS Paul Revere (APA/LPA-248) was the lead ship of the Paul Revere class of attack transport in the United States Navy. She was named for the early patriot and Founding Father, Paul Revere (1735–1818). She later served in the Spanish Navy as Castilla (L-21).

The ship was designed under project SCB 14 and laid down as Maritime Administration Hull 27 on 15 May 1952 by the New York Shipbuilding Corp., Camden, New Jersey, and was launched on 11 April 1953 as SS Diamond Mariner, sponsored by Mrs. Franklin Ewers. The ship was delivered to MARAD on 22 December 1953, and was operated by the Prudential Steamship Corporation for MARAD until placed in the Maritime Reserve Fleet on 24 July 1954. She was acquired by the US Navy on 14 September 1956, classified APA-248 and named Paul Revere on 4 June 1957, converted by Todd Shipyards, Los Angeles Division, San Pedro, California, and commissioned at Long Beach, California on 3 September 1958.

== Service history ==
=== 1958–1964 ===
After shakedown, Paul Revere spent the next full year participating in a series of amphibious training operations: "Rocky Shoals" at San Diego in November 1958, "Twin Peaks" at Camp Pendleton in February 1959, "PACNAMIDLEX" at Del Mar, California in August, "Clear Ridge" off California in September, and "Totem Pole" at Kodiak, Alaska during November.

During 1960–1961, she was assigned "Ready APA" duty, in which she maintained on board, at all times, a fully equipped and reinforced battalion of landing troops to be put ashore on short notice at any trouble spot in the Pacific. On 21 March 1961 trouble flared in Laos, and Paul Revere commenced patrolling the waters off the coast of Southeast Asia. She remained in the area in a ready status for a total of fifty-four days until tensions eased, then resumed her normal South China Sea patrol.

In January 1962, after returning to the U.S., Paul Revere accomplished a most dramatic rescue, when one of several helicopters engaged in anti-submarine warfare (ASW) exercises plunged into the ocean. Operating several hundred yards from the scene, she launched a manned boat which returned the three crewmen of the helicopter to the ship for medical treatment, all in the space of six minutes.

Following overhaul, she spent the last five or six months of 1962 in the Western Pacific. This deployment included the ports of Subic Bay, Hong Kong, and several ports in Japan. The year 1963 saw her complete a successful WestPac deployment and another rigorous schedule of training operations.

Departing San Diego on 28 January 1964 for her fourth WestPac deployment en route to Pearl Harbor Paul Revere participated in "Coco Palm", a merchant convoy sailing exercise. From Pearl Harbor she sailed to Buckner Bay in preparation for one of the largest amphibious operations since the end of World War II. This exercise, called "Back Pack", involved over 50,000 American and Nationalist Chinese personnel and over 125 ships. It was conducted off the southwestern coast of Taiwan and terminated on 12 March. Paul Revere also participated in "Ligtas", a combined SEATO exercise in the Philippines during May, and operation "Minute Hand", conducted at Numazu, Japan in July. While returning to the states in August 1964 USS Turner Joy and USS Maddox were fired upon by North Vietnamese vessels in the Gulf of Tonkin. Paul Revere was turned around and went back to Okinawa and picked up 2,500 Marines and sailed for Vietnam. She went up the Saigon River to aid in the salvage of USNS Card. Returning to the United States, she joined another convoy exercise, "Mad Bull", and arrived San Diego in October.

=== Vietnam, 1964–1972 ===
Paul Revere spent the first seven months of 1965 conducting training operations off the coast. In August it lifted elements of the 1st Marine Division to Okinawa and during October and November it transported personnel of South Korea's Tiger Division to Qui Nhon, South Vietnam from Pusan. From 7–18 November it conducted its first actual combat assault as a unit involved in Operation Blue Marlin, with Marine battalions embarked. The ship was involved in a similar operation called Operation Double Eagle at Quảng Ngãi Province, landing the 3rd Battalion, 1st Marines, 1st Marine Division, on 28 January 1966. It continued lift support for Marine units in Vietnam through March and then returned to San Diego on 19 April. Personnel aboard Paul Revere were eligible for hostile fire pay for the months of November 1965 as well as January and February 1966.

Paul Revere resumed coastal operations on its return, until May 1967 when it again deployed to the Far East. As a unit of the Amphibious Ready Group (ARG) off the coast of Vietnam it engaged in operations "Belt Drive", "Fortress Sentry", "Formation Leader" and "Knox". The ship returned to San Diego on 16 December and commenced coastal operations. For meritorious service from 17 August to 11 November 1967 during sustained amphibious operations against communist insurgent forces in the Republic of Vietnam, Paul Revere was awarded the Meritorious Unit Commendation, the first ship of its type to receive the award.

During 1968 the ship participated in training cruises for Naval Reservists and Midshipmen, including a special familiarization cruise for Sea Cadets. It also continued its upkeep and training preparations for its next coming deployment in January 1969.

Having been redesignated LPA-248 on 1 January 1969, Paul Revere deployed on 30 January, departing San Diego as part of ARG "Bravo" (TG 76.5) in company with Tulare, Belle Grove, Alamo, Cook, Tortuga and Valley Forge, bound, via Pearl Harbor and Subic Bay, for Southeast Asia. Ports-of-call during the cruise included Pearl Harbor, Subic Bay, Buckner Bay, Okinawa; Kaohsiung, Taiwan; Yokosuka, and Hong Kong. Paul Revere arrived in its operating area off South Vietnam on 7 March and delivered its cargo to Da Nang and supported combat operations conducted by a USMC Battalion Landing Team which was embarked on board.

Toward the end of the deployment, Paul Revere participated in a series of "Keystone" operations beginning with Operation Keystone Eagle on 14 July 1969. After a farewell ceremony on the deep water piers in Da Nang Harbor, the 1st Battalion, 9th Marines boarded Paul Revere and sailed for Okinawa in the first increment of America's withdrawal from South Vietnam. A photograph of the ship loading Marines appeared in Newsweek magazine. The 2nd and 3rd Battalions of the 9th Marines were transported to Okinawa in two subsequent trips. Paul Revere was relieved of duty with ARG "Bravo" (TG 76.5) by Vancouver on 29 August 1969 at Subic Bay. In an awards ceremony at Naval Station San Diego, Captain Mitchell Karlowicz was awarded the Bronze Star for commanding Paul Revere in support of combat operations against the enemy.

On 7 November 1969, USS Paul Revere participated in an exercise with several ships and Sculpin, to test torpedoes on a decommissioned submarine, Bream, which was to be sunk as a target in the SoCal Op Areas. Bream, which was operated remotely from Paul Revere, was ultimately sunk by naval gunfire from an accompanying cruiser.

Paul Revere had a dry dock period at the Hunters Point Naval Shipyard from November 1969 to April 1970. During the time in the yards, it was refitted with modern ECM equipment and additional communications hardware to enable the ship to deploy as the flagship for Amphibious Groups I and III on a WestPac cruise in September 1970. The cruise began with Paul Revere escorting two new gunboats, Tacoma and Welch, to Pearl Harbor. During the 1970–71 cruise, under the command of a naval aviator, Captain Charles Lindberg, the ship visited Pearl Harbor, Bangkok, Subic Bay, Okinawa, Sasebo, Keelung, Taiwan; Yokosuka, Hong Kong and Singapore. On the voyage to Singapore Paul Revere crossed the equator and initiated the crew's "pollywogs."

The USS Paul Revere LPA-248 deployed for WESTPAC in early summer of 1972. The ship stopped at Eniwetok Atoll where it delivered to the atoll guardians a LCM boat as theirs had been destroyed by a typhoon we spent a full day there. Eniwetok was where the US set off our first hydrogen bomb at and was still highly radioactive at the time. Not knowing some of the crew fished there, BIG FISH and ate them. When not off the Coast of Nam acting as TASK FORCE 76 and the 9th MASRINE AMPHIBIOUS BRIGADE the ship made R&R in Hong Kong, visited Keelung Taiwan, Koshing Taiwan, Subic Bay. In Nam operations electronic eves dropping was a constant operation. The Ship went into Danang Harbor twice during the cruise and took part in FAKE AMPHIBIUS ASSAULTS to DRAW Noth Vietnamese forces away from Quan Tri City in SEP of 1972. During that operation the USS Paul REVER was fired upon by NV forces upon TIGER Island and the ship returned fire and hostile fire ceased. Allied response to the North Vietnamese Easter Offensive The Ship tied up at White Beach Okinawa frequently upon breaks from Nam it was also main HQ the 9th Marines. The USS Paul Revere LPA-248 returned to San Diego during the month of March 1973 and stopped at Pearl Harbor to refuel along the way.

=== Post-Vietnam, 1972–decommissioning ===
Paul Revere made a WESTPAC cruise February to September 1974 and was host to TACRON-1 Unit Delta and Seventh Fleet Amphibious Staff. After departing the US to begin the cruise, after passing Guam, the ship was shadowed by a Russian trawler until reaching its first port of call, White Beach, Okinawa. After Okinawa the next stops were, Subic Bay and the Tonkin Gulf. Skirting just outside the Vietnam combat zone, Paul Revere passed near a Russian task force of seven combat ships, mostly destroyers. During which time some of the vessels approached the ship. The next stop was Bangkok, Thailand, and then Singapore. On the way to Jakarta, Indonesia, the crew crossed the equator. Returning briefly to Subic Bay, Paul Revere made a hasty run to open water to escape being caught in port during an incoming typhoon. Eventually stopping back at Okinawa. Paul Revere continued its '74 WESTPAC north to South Korea and Japan.

After Vietnam Paul Revere was placed in reserve status, home-ported at Terminal Island, Long Beach, California and crewed by Naval Reserve personnel.

Later in 1974, she took on the men and equipment of the 3rd Battalion, 47th Infantry Regiment, 9th Infantry Division at Fort Lewis, Washington and delivered them to the Marine Corps Camp Pendleton for amphibious operations and desert warfare training. During the voyage, she was followed by a Soviet Union submarine, which was in turn followed by a U.S. Navy submarine.

In February 1975, she took the men and equipment of the 2nd Battalion 2nd Infantry, 9th Infantry division at Fort Lewis Washington and delivered them to San Diego for training at Coronado Naval Base and Camp Pendleton for Amphibious and Range Training.

In the summer of 1977 during her crew's annual drill period, she took on board the men and equipment of 2nd Battalion, 39th Infantry Regiment (part of 1st Brigade, 9th Infantry Division at Fort Lewis, Washington), and delivered them to Camp Pendleton Marine Corps base for amphibious operations training.

In May 1979, Paul Revere served as a training platform for the first Seaman Apprenticeship class to be trained on a US naval vessel. Previously to this all sailor's who went to Seaman Apprenticeship training did so on USS Never Sail at RTC San Diego, California. At the time, the ship was based out of Long Beach and for two weeks, the students participated in both classroom and OJT instruction. At midpoint in training, Paul Revere got underway and spent the weekend at sea and even performed an Unrep.

== Castilla (L-21) ==
Paul Revere was decommissioned and struck from the Naval Vessel Register on 1 January 1980, and subsequently sold through the Security Assistance Program to Spain on 17 January 1980, renamed Castilla (L-21). The Spanish Navy decommissioned the ship on 6 June 1998, and in 2000 it was scrapped at Puerto de Santa Maria, Spain, the seaport from which Columbus embarked on his second voyage.

== Awards, citations, and campaign ribbons ==
Navy Meritorious Unit Commendation
National Defense Service Medal
Armed Forces Expeditionary Medal with 6 service stars
Vietnam Service Medal with 6 service stars
Republic of Vietnam Gallantry Cross Unit Citation (5)
Republic of Vietnam Campaign Medal

== See also ==
- HMCS Provider (AOR 508) - based on specifications from Paul Revere
- List of United States Navy amphibious warfare ships § Attack transport (APA)
