= USS Francis Marion =

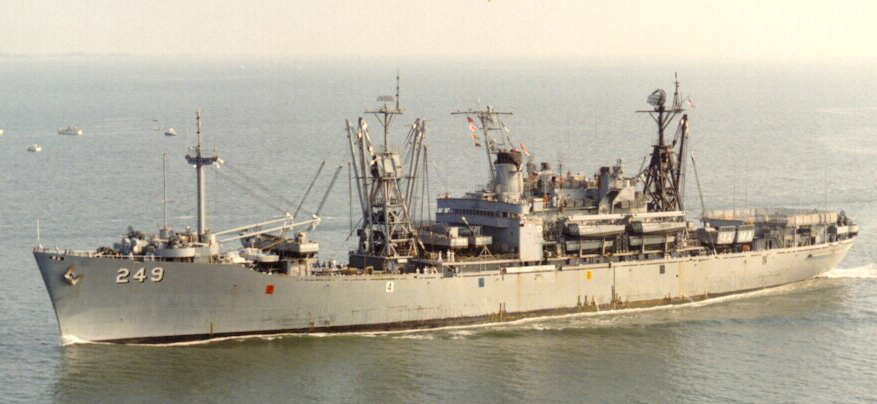
- USS Francis Marion

History

United States
- Name: USS Francis Marion
- Builder: New York Shipbuilding, Camden, New Jersey;
- Launched: 13 February 1954, as SS Prairie Mariner
- Acquired: 16 March 1959
- Commissioned: 6 July 1961
- Decommissioned: 14 September 1979
- Reclassified: LPA-249, 1 January 1969
- Stricken: 1 January 1980
- Fate: Sold to Spain, 11 July 1980

Spain
- Name: Aragón
- Acquired: 11 July 1980
- Decommissioned: 2000
- Identification: L-22
- Status: Training hulk for UOE in Cádiz, Scrapped c.2002

General characteristics
- Class & type: Paul Revere-class attack transport
- Displacement: 16,828 long tons (17,098 t) full
- Length: 563 ft 6 in (171.75 m)
- Beam: 76 ft (23 m)
- Draft: 27 ft (8.2 m)
- Propulsion: Geared turbine, 19,250 hp (14,350 kW); 2 × Foster Wheeler boilers, 620 PSI; Single screw
- Speed: 20 knots (37 km/h; 23 mph)
- Troops: 1,500
- Complement: 414
- Armament: 4 × twin mount 3"/50 caliber guns
- Aviation facilities: elevate aft flight deck

USS Francis Marion (APA-249) was a Paul Revere-class attack transport of the United States Navy. The ship was launched on 13 February 1954 as Prairie Mariner by the New York Shipbuilding Corp., Camden, New Jersey, sponsored by Mrs. C. A. Wolverton, and delivered on 25 May to the Maritime Administration who operated her until she was placed in the National Defense Reserve Fleet on 6 January 1955.

She was transferred to the Navy on 16 March 1959, named, classified APA-249, and converted by Bethlehem Steel Co., Baltimore, Maryland. Francis Marion was commissioned on 6 July 1961.

== Service history ==
=== US Navy ship, 1961–1975 ===
The ship deployed on numerous major exercises from 1961 to 1968. In October – November 1962, she served as part of the U.S. naval blockade of Cuba during the Cuban Missile Crisis with units of the 8th Marine Regiment aboard. In December 1968 she served as the secondary recovery ship for the Apollo 8 lunar mission. On 1 January 1969 she was designated an Amphibious Transport (LPA-249). From 1969 through 1975 Francis Marion participated in numerous amphibious assault exercises in the Mediterranean and Caribbean. She was in the Med 2-70 exercise and was part of the CARIB Ready Group 1-71, CARIB 2-72, and CARIB 1-73. In 1974, she participated in three amphibious exercises and in 1975 she was in two more exercises.

=== Naval Reserve ship, 1975–1979 ===
In November 1975, the ship's status was changed to a Naval Reserve Forces Ship and she was crewed with a mix of USN and Naval Reserve personnel. In 1976, she underwent a major overhaul in Baltimore. On 13 June 1977, Rear-Admiral John C. Dixon, Jr., his staff and crewmembers, along with 341 Midshipmen from the United States Naval Academy and NROTC Units were aboard when the ship departed Norfolk, Virginia as flagship for TG 21.6, the U.S. contingent for the Silver Jubilee Naval Review in honor of Queen Elizabeth II. On 16 May 1978 she carried 1,100 Marines to participate in Solid Shield 78. In December 1978 she received the Commander in Chief, U.S. Atlantic Fleet "Golden Anchor" award.

=== Decommissioning and sale ===
In 1979 the Navy determined the Francis Marion was excess to the Navy's needs and she was decommissioned on 14 September 1979. In 1979 she was also involved in a collision at sea at Thimble Shoals demarcation line- the entrance to Chesapeake Bay. The ship suffered 1.5 million dollars in damage and several people were severely injured including the XO and Operations officer who was OOD at the time. The fog was extremely thick that morning and visibility was zero. Navigation was by radar with bridge to bridge communications. She was struck from the Naval Vessel Register on 1 January 1980.

On 11 July 1980 the ship was sold to Spain under the Security Assistance Program and renamed Aragón (L-22). She was decommissioned by the Spanish Navy in 2000 and was transferred to the Spanish Special Operations Unit (UOE) at La Carraca, Cádiz for use as a training vessel.
