= HMAS LST 3014 =

1944 LST(3)-class tank landing ship

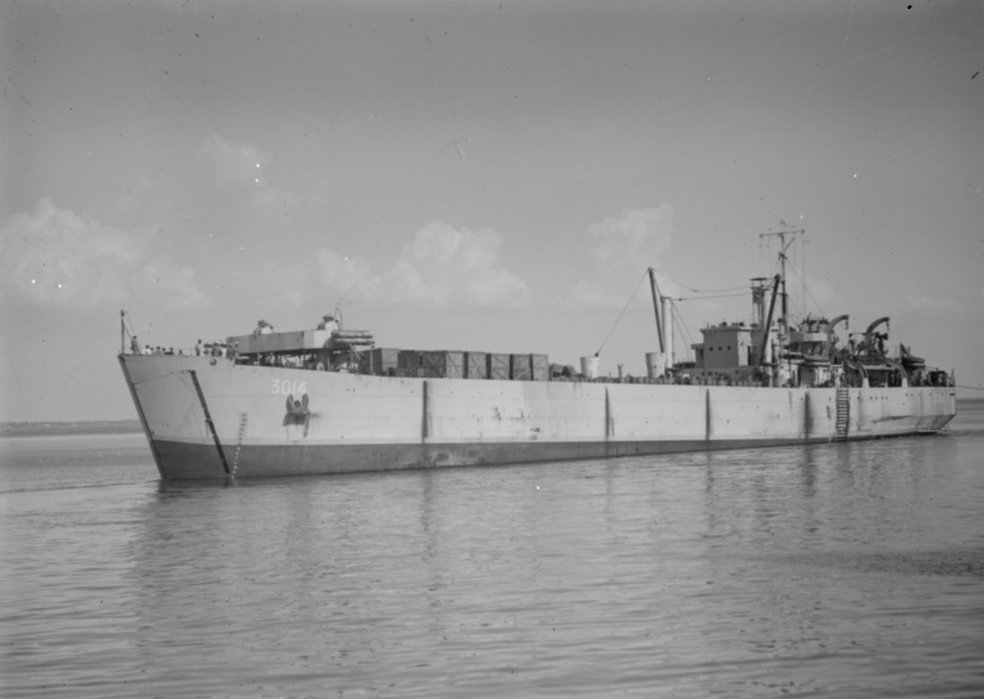
- HMAS LST 3014 in 1947

History

United Kingdom / Australia
- Builder: Barclay Curle, United Kingdom
- Launched: 11 November 1944
- Commissioned: 1 July 1946 (into RAN)
- Decommissioned: 1950
- Fate: Scrapped during the 1950s

General characteristics
- Displacement: 2,300 tons
- Length: 347 ft (106 m)
- Beam: 55 ft 3 in (16.84 m)
- Draught: 12 ft 6 in (3.81 m)
- Speed: 13.5 knots (25.0 km/h; 15.5 mph)
- Armament: 10 × 20mm anti-aircraft guns

HMAS LST 3014 was a landing ship tank which was briefly operated by the Royal Navy and Royal Australian Navy (RAN). She was built at Barclay Curle in the United Kingdom during World War II and was launched on 11 November 1944. She served with the Royal Navy as HMS LST 3014 until 1 July 1946 when she was transferred to the RAN. In RAN service she was used to dump ammunition at sea. HMAS LST 3014 was sold for scrap on 4 June 1950.
