= Type 072 landing ship =

Chinese tank landing ship

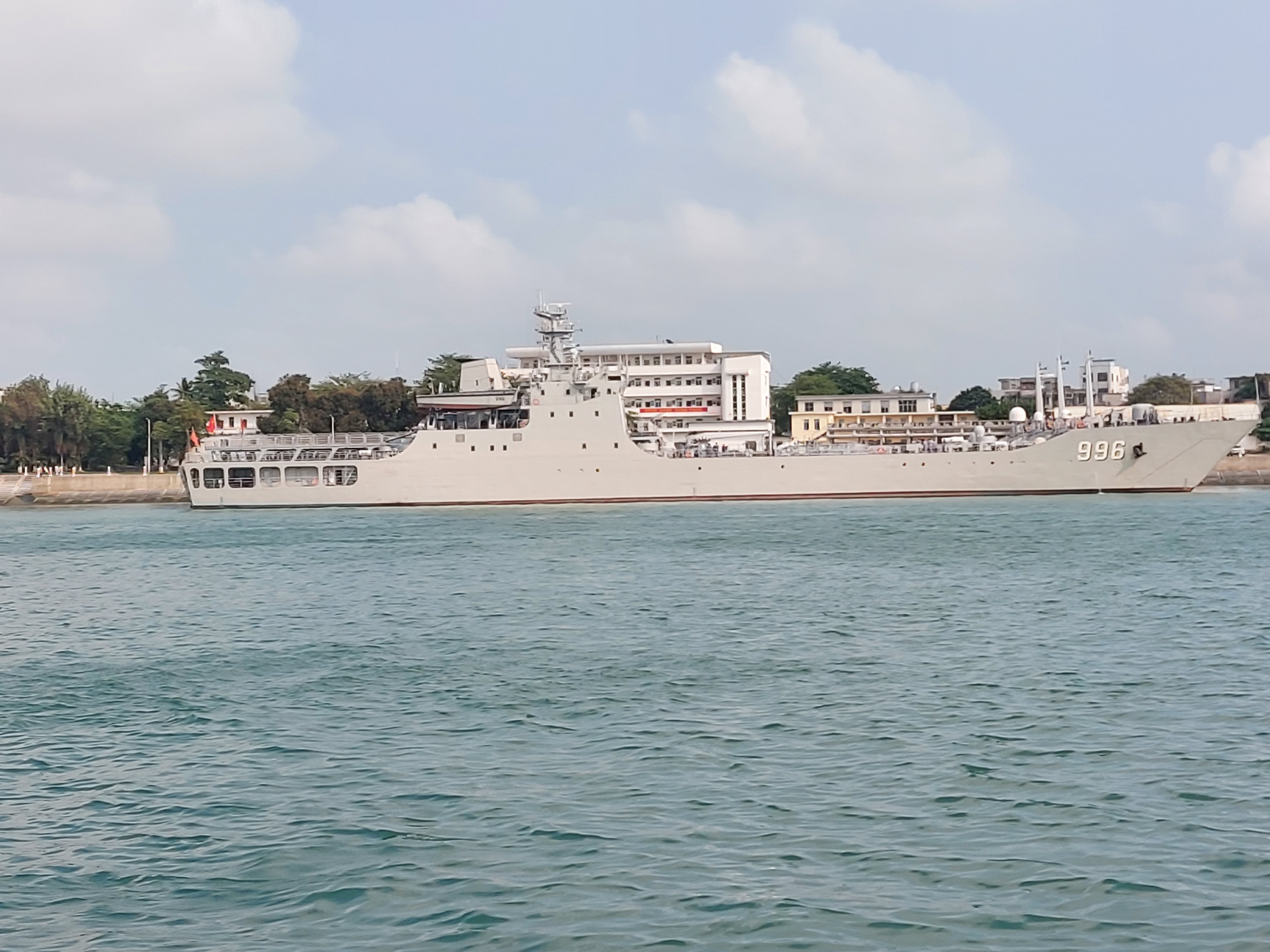

Class overview
- Operators: People's Liberation Army Navy
- Succeeded by: Type 072II landing ship
- Built: c. 1980 - 1995
- In service: 1979- ?
- Completed: 7
- Retired: 3

General characteristics
- Type: Tank landing ship
- Displacement: 4,237 tonnes (4,170 long tons; 4,670 short tons) (full)
- Length: 120 metres (390 ft)
- Beam: 15.3 metres (50 ft)
- Draught: 2.9 metres (9 ft 6 in)
- Speed: 18 knots (33 km/h; 21 mph)
- Range: 3,000 nautical miles (5,600 km; 3,500 mi) at 14 knots (26 km/h; 16 mph)
- Boats & landing craft carried: 2 LCVP
- Troops: 200 troops; 10 tanks
- Crew: 109
- Sensors & processing systems: 2 x Type 753 navigation radar
- Armament: 1 x twin 57 mm gun; 2, 3, or 4 x twin 23 mm guns; 2 or 4 x twin 25 mm guns

The Type 072 (NATO reporting name: Yukan) is a class of tank landing ship in the People's Republic of China's People's Liberation Army Navy (PLAN). Seven were built and began entering service by the early-1980s. They replaced American-built LSTs from the Second World War.

Production may have occurred at the Wuhan Shipyard, with the first completed in 1980, or at the Zhonghua Shipyard, with ships entering service from 1978 to 1995.

The bow ramp handles a 50-ton load, and the rear ramp a 20-ton load. It carries two American LCVPs.

== Supply ship ==
A class of supply or ammunition ship (NATO reporting name: Yantai) was developed from the Type 072. Changes include a shorter forecastle, a blunter bow without a door, and the addition of cranes fore and aft of the superstructure.

Three were built by Zhonghua and entered PLAN service in 1992.

== Ships of the class ==
| Name | Namesake | Hull No. | Builder | Launched | Commissioned | Decommissioned | Fleet | Status |
Type 072
| Yuntaishan (云台山) | Yuntai Mountain | 927 | | | 1979 | July 7, 2020 | East Sea Fleet | Retired |
| Wufengshan (五峰山) | Mount Wufeng | 928 | | | | July 30, 2020 | East Sea Fleet (prior to 2013) South Sea Fleet (post 2013) | Retired |
| Zijinshan (紫金山) | Purple Mountain | 929 | | | 1982 | July 7, 2020 | East Sea Fleet | Retired |
| Lingyanshan (灵岩山) | Lingyan Mountain | 930 | | | | | East Sea Fleet | Active |
| Dongtingshan (洞庭山) | Xiang Mountain, formerly known as Dongting Mountain | 931 | | | | | East Sea Fleet | Active |
| Helanshan (贺兰山) | Helan Mountains | 932 | | | | | East Sea Fleet | Active |
| Liupanshan (六盘山) | Mount Liupan | 933 | | | | | East Sea Fleet | Active |
Supply ship variant
| | | 745 | | | | | South Sea Fleet | Active |
| | | 757 | | | | | East Sea Fleet | Active |
| | | 938 | | | | | South Sea Fleet | Active |

== Sources ==
- Saunders, Stephan, ed. (2015). Jane's Fighting Ships 2015-2016. Jane's Information Group. ISBN 978-0710631435.
- Wertheim, Eric (2013). The Naval Institute Guide to Combat Fleets of the World: Their Ships, Aircraft, and Systems (16 ed.). Annapolis, Maryland: Naval Institute Press. ISBN 978-1591149545.
