= USS Nye County =

LST-542 class tank landing ship

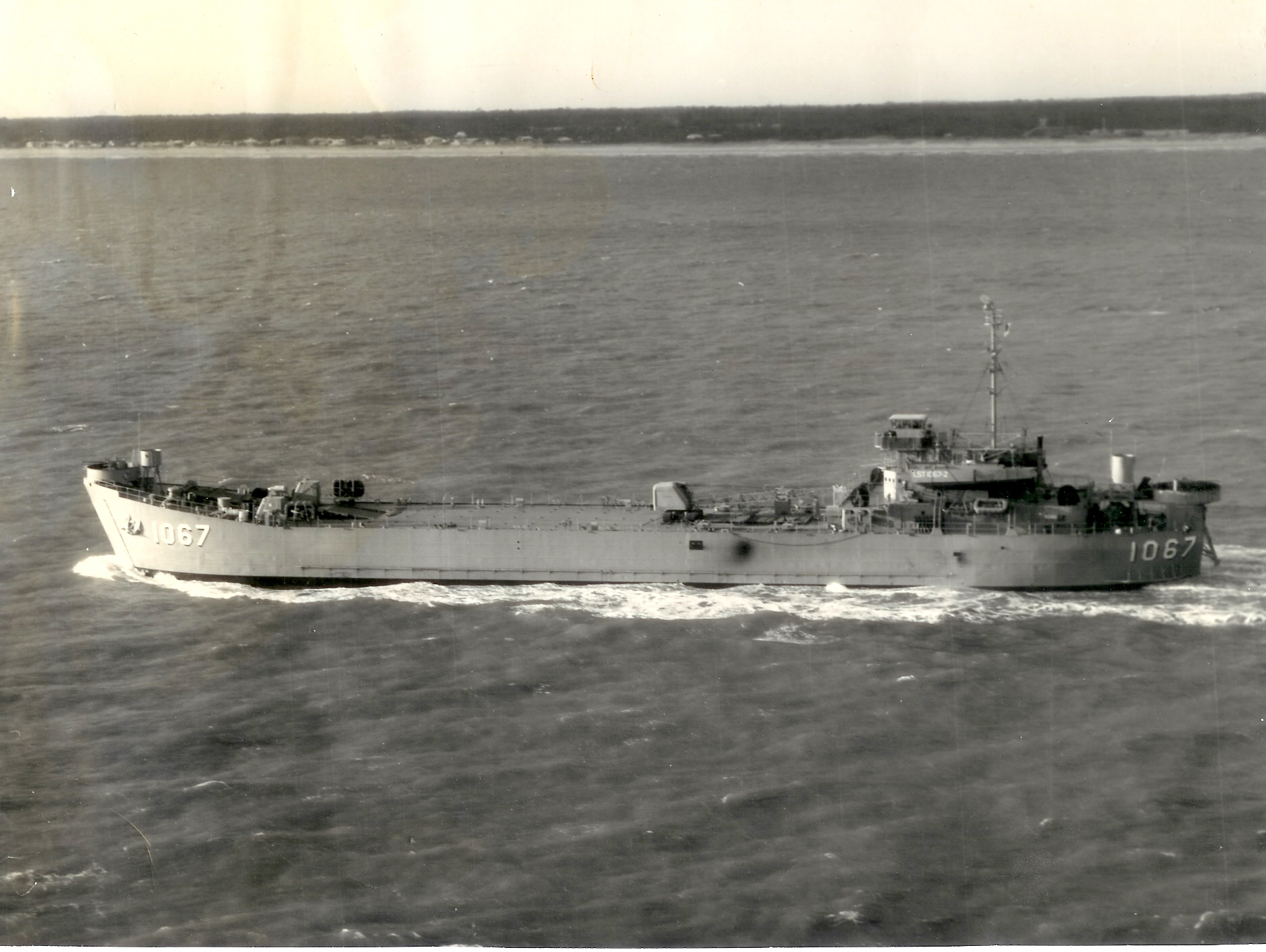
- USS Nye County (LST-1067), ex-LST-1067, underway off Norfolk, Virginia, c. 1966.

History

United States
- Name: LST-1067 (1945–1955); Nye County (1955–1973)
- Namesake: Nye County, Nevada
- Builder: Bethlehem-Hingham Shipyard, Hingham, Massachusetts
- Yard number: 3457
- Laid down: 24 January 1945
- Launched: 27 February 1945
- Commissioned: 24 March 1945
- Decommissioned: 13 August 1946
- Identification: Hull symbol: LST-1067; Code letters: NAIH
- Renamed: Nye County, 1 July 1955
- Recommissioned: 22 May 1963, in reserve; 21 December 1965, full commission
- Decommissioned: 27 March 1967
- Honors and awards: two battle stars, Vietnam War
- Fate: Assigned to the Military Sea Transportation Service (MSTS)

United States
- Name: Nye County
- Operator: MSTS
- Acquired: 27 March 1967
- Stricken: 10 June 1973
- Identification: Hull symbol: T-LST-1067
- Fate: Sold to Chilean Navy, 1 August 1973

Chile
- Name: Comandante Araya
- Acquired: 1 August 1973
- Out of service: 14 December 1981
- Identification: Hull symbol: LST-89
- Fate: Sold for scrapping 29 March 1982

General characteristics
- Class & type: LST-542-class tank landing ship
- Displacement: 1,625 long tons (1,651 t) (light); 4,080 long tons (4,145 t) (full (seagoing draft with 1,675 short tons (1,520 t) load); 2,366 long tons (2,404 t) (beaching)
- Length: 328 ft (100 m) oa
- Beam: 50 ft (15 m)
- Draft: Unloaded: 2 ft 4 in (0.71 m) forward; 7 ft 6 in (2.29 m) aft; Full load: 8 ft 3 in (2.51 m) forward; 14 ft 1 in (4.29 m) aft; Landing with 500 short tons (450 t) load: 3 ft 11 in (1.19 m) forward; 9 ft 10 in (3.00 m) aft; Limiting 11 ft 2 in (3.40 m); Maximum navigation 14 ft 1 in (4.29 m)
- Installed power: 2 × 900 hp (670 kW) Electro-Motive Diesel 12-567A diesel engines; 1,800 shp (1,300 kW)
- Propulsion: 1 × Falk main reduction gears; 2 × Propellers
- Speed: 11.6 kn (21.5 km/h; 13.3 mph)
- Range: 24,000 nmi (44,000 km; 28,000 mi) at 9 kn (17 km/h; 10 mph) while displacing 3,960 long tons (4,024 t)
- Boats & landing craft carried: 2 x LCVPs
- Capacity: 1,600–1,900 short tons (3,200,000–3,800,000 lb; 1,500,000–1,700,000 kg) cargo depending on mission
- Troops: 16 officers, 147 enlisted men
- Complement: 13 officers, 104 enlisted men
- Armament: Varied, ultimate armament; 2 × twin 40 mm (1.57 in) Bofors guns; 4 × single 40 mm Bofors guns; 12 × 20 mm (0.79 in) Oerlikon cannons

Service record
- Part of: LST Flotilla 33
- Awards: World War II; American Campaign Medal; Asiatic–Pacific Campaign Medal; World War II Victory Medal; Navy Occupation Service Medal w/Asia Clasp; Vietnam War; Combat Action Ribbon; National Defense Service Medal; Armed Forces Expeditionary Medal; Vietnam Service Medal; Republic of Vietnam Gallantry Cross Unit Citation; Republic of Vietnam Civil Actions Unit Citation; Republic of Vietnam Campaign Medal

USS Nye County (LST-1067) was an LST-542-class tank landing ship in the United States Navy. Unlike many of her class, which received only numbers and were disposed of after World War II, she survived long enough to be named. On 1 July 1955, all LSTs still in commission were named for US counties or parishes; LST-1067 was given the name Nye County, after a county in Nevada.

== Construction ==
LST-1067 was laid down on 24 January 194,5 at Hingham, Massachusetts, by the Bethlehem-Hingham Shipyard; launched on 27 February 1945; and commissioned on 24 March 1945.

== Service history ==
=== World War II ===
Upon completing shakedown along the Virginia coast, LST–1067 sailed to Davisville, Rhode Island, to load materials of war. Departing 16 May 1945, she steamed via the Panama Canal, first to Pearl Harbor, and then with additional cargo, to Guam, arriving 19 July. A second logistic voyage from the Hawaiian Islands to the Marianas occurred in the immediate aftermath of the Japanese surrender. She then embarked occupation forces at Leyte, and landed them on Honshū, Japan, 2 November. Turning eastward for the long trip to the United States, LST–1067 arrived at San Francisco, on 6 January 1946, and decommissioned at Portland, Oregon, on 13 August 1946.

=== Reserve ===
Named Nye County 1 July 1955, the landing ship recommissioned "in reserve" 22 May 1963, and was assigned to the newly created RESLSTRON 2 based at Little Creek, Virginia. The value of this squadron during the Dominican Republic crisis brought a full commissioning 21 December 1965, and new duties in the Western Pacific.

=== Vietnam War ===
Though based at Sasebo, Japan, Nye County spent much time between April 1966 and March 1967, offloading supplies at critical points along the central coast of South Vietnam. Ordered to Pusan, Korea, she decommissioned 27 March 1967, and was turned over to the Military Sea Transportation Service. Manned largely by a Korean crew, she continued to sail in Far Eastern waters in 1970, as USNS Nye County (T-LST-1067).

== Chilean Navy service ==
She was later sold to Chile, 1 August 1973, where she was renamed Commandante Araya (LST-89). She was taken out of service 14 December 1981, and sold for scrapping 29 March 1982.

== Awards ==
Nye County earned two battle stars for the Vietnam War.

== Bibliography ==
Online resources

- "LST-1067". Dictionary of American Naval Fighting Ships. Naval History and Heritage Command. 29 July 2015. This article incorporates text from this source, which is in the public domain.
- "Nye County". Dictionary of American Naval Fighting Ships. Naval History and Heritage Command. 14 August 2015. This article incorporates text from this source, which is in the public domain.
- "Bethlehem-Hingham, Hingham MA". www.ShipbuildingHistory.com. 11 August 2011.
- "USNS Nye County (T-LST-1067)". NavSource. 9 September 2016.
