= USS Dodge County =

1944 LST-542-class tank landing ship

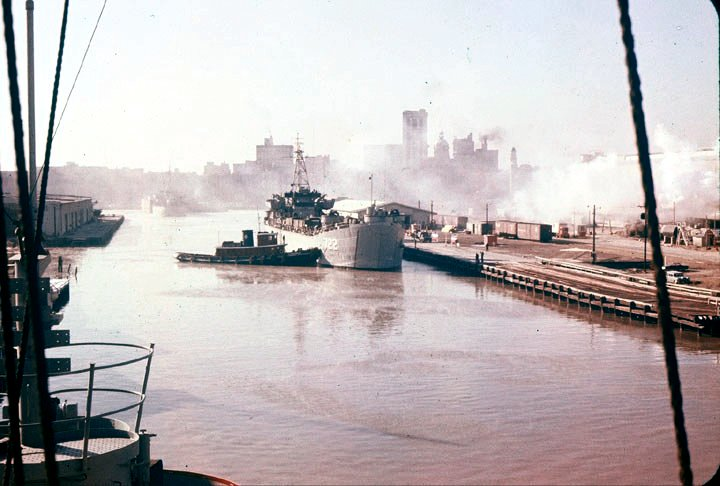
- Dodge County arrives at Savannah, Georgia to off-load 1st Armored Division troops during the Cuban Missile Crisis in November–December 1962. (Photo taken from Duval County.)

History

United States
- Name: USS LST-722
- Builder: Jeffersonville Boat & Machinery Co., Jeffersonville, Indiana
- Laid down: 15 July 1944
- Launched: 21 August 1944
- Commissioned: 13 September 1944
- Decommissioned: 13 July 1946
- Recommissioned: 16 November 1951
- Decommissioned: 3 January 1956
- Renamed: USS Dodge County (LST-722), 1 July 1955
- Recommissioned: 1961
- Decommissioned: October 1969
- Stricken: 15 September 1974
- Honours and awards: 1 battle star (World War II)
- Fate: Sold to Royal Thai Navy, 1 November 1975

Thailand
- Name: HTMS Prathong
- Namesake: Phra Thong Island
- Acquired: 1 November 1975
- Decommissioned: 2009

General characteristics
- Class & type: LST-542-class tank landing ship
- Displacement: 1,780 long tons (1,809 t) light; 3,640 long tons (3,698 t) full
- Length: 328 ft (100 m)
- Beam: 50 ft (15 m)
- Draft: Unloaded : 2 ft 4 in (0.71 m) forward; 7 ft 6 in (2.29 m) aft; Loaded : 8 ft 2 in (2.49 m) forward; 14 ft 1 in (4.29 m) aft
- Propulsion: 2 × General Motors 12-567 diesel engines, two shafts, twin rudders
- Speed: 12 knots (22 km/h; 14 mph)
- Boats & landing craft carried: 2 LCVPs
- Troops: Approximately 130 officers and enlisted men
- Complement: 8–10 officers, 89–100 enlisted men
- Armament: 8 × 40 mm guns; 12 × 20 mm guns

USS Dodge County (LST-722) was an LST-542 class Landing Ship Tank, built for the United States Navy during World War II. She was renamed USS Dodge County on the first of July 1955, for counties in Georgia, Minnesota, Nebraska, and Wisconsin, and was the only United States Navy vessel to bear the name.

LST-722 was laid down on the fifteenth of July 1944, at Jeffersonville, Indiana, by the Jeffersonville Boat and Machine Company. She was launched on August twenty-first, 1944, and sponsored by miss Rosemary Furey, before being commissioned on the thirteenth of September 1944.

== Service history ==
During World War II, LST-722 was assigned to the Asiatic-Pacific theater, and would go on to participate in the landings at Palawan, then Mindanao. LST-722 earned one battle star for World War II service, and following the war's end, performed occupation duty in the Far East, until April 1946. She was subsequently decommissioned on the thirteenth of July 1946.

Recommissioned on the sixteenth of November 1951, she was assigned to the Amphibious Force of the United States Atlantic Fleet. On July first, 1955, LST-722 was renamed USS Dodge County, but was decommissioned again a year later, on January third.

Dodge County was recommissioned once again in 1961, and participated in the Cuban Missile Crisis from October to December of the following year. She was subsequently assigned, once again, to the Amphibious Force of the United States Atlantic Fleet. Dodge County was decommissioned again sometime in October 1969, ending her career in the United States Navy. On the fifteenth of September 1974, was struck from the Naval Vessel Register.

She was sold to Thailand under the Security Assistance Program on the first of November 1975, and renamed HTMS Prathong (Thai: เรือหลวงพระทอง). After serving as an amphibious warfare training ship for the Royal Thai Marine Corps, Prathong was decommissioned circa 2003; she was originally to be scrapped, but the order was superseded, and she was abandoned beside the village of Thung La-Ong, at approximately 9°2.602 N, 98° 19.375 E. In 2016 the USS Dodge County, LST 722 / HTMS Prathong was sunk of the coast of Thailand to serve as a diving reef.

== See also ==
- List of United States Navy LSTs
