= HTMS Chang =

HTMS Chang is the name of the following ships of the Royal Thai Navy, named after the island of Ko Chang:

- HTMS Chang (I), a transport ship in service from 1902 to 1962
- HTMS Chang (712), the former USS Lincoln County, (LST-898), an LST-542-class tank landing ship acquired from the United States Navy in 1962, decommissioned in 2006, and scuttled as an artificial reef in 2012
- HTMS Chang (LPD-792), a Type 071 landing platform dock ordered in 2019 and launched in 2023
