= Paul Revere-class attack transport =

Class of attack transports of the United States Navy

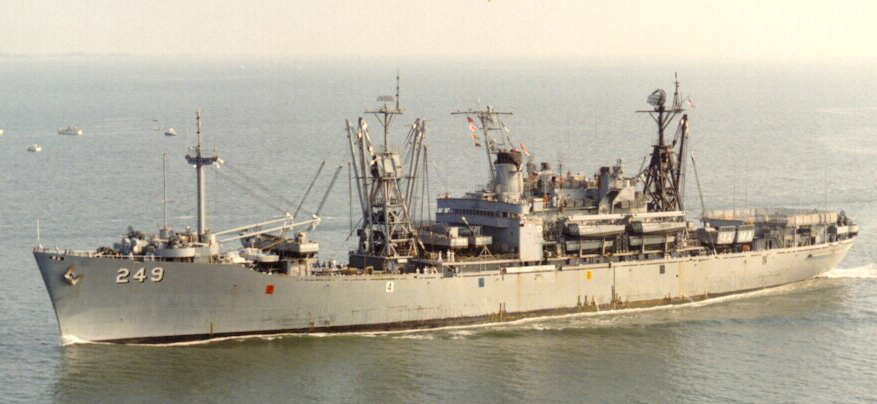
- USS Francis Marion in 1960s

Class overview
- Name: Paul Revere class
- Builders: New York Shipbuilding Corp.
- Operators: United States Navy; Spanish Navy
- Preceded by: Haskell class
- Succeeded by: none
- Built: 1952–1954
- In service: 1958–1980
- Completed: 2
- Retired: 2

General characteristics
- Type: Attack transport; Type C4-S-1A
- Displacement: 16,828 t (16,562 long tons), full load
- Length: 563 ft 6 in (171.75 m)
- Beam: 76 ft (23 m)
- Draft: 27 ft 0 in (8.23 m)
- Installed power: 1 × propeller; 19,250 shp (14,355 kW); 620 psi (4,275 kPa)
- Propulsion: 1 × geared turbine; 1 × Babcock & Wilcox WT-type boilers
- Speed: 20 knots (37 km/h; 23 mph)
- Boats & landing craft carried: 12 × LCVPs; 7 × LCM-6s; 2 × LCPLs
- Capacity: 1,680 t (1,653 long tons); 10,487 sq. ft. vehicle; 876 bbls gasoline
- Troops: 100 officers; 1,500 enlisted
- Complement: 414 officers and enlisted
- Sensors & processing systems: 1 × AN/SPS-40 air-search radar; 1 × AN/SPS-10 surface-search radar
- Armament: 4 × dual 3"/50 caliber guns
- Aviation facilities: Helicopter deck

The Paul Revere-class attack transport was a ship class of attack transports of the United States Navy during the Cold War. Both ships were converted from the Type C4-S-1A cargo ships, and would be the last attack transports to be procured by the Navy.

== Development ==
Two type C4 cargo ships were converted into attack transports for the United States Navy since the middle stages of the 1950s. Both ships were decommissioned on 1 January 1980 and later sold to the Spanish Navy in the same year.

The ship's hull remained nearly the same but with new equipment to carry out her purpose now placed on deck alongside several cranes. The ships' armaments had been slightly changed and relocated in order for the ships to carry out their new roles.

== Ships in the class ==
Paul Revere class attack transport							
Hull no.	Name	Builder	Laid down	Launched	Commissioned	Decommissioned	Fate
APA-248 / LPA-248	Paul Revere	New York Shipbuilding Corp.	15 May 1952	11 April 1953	3 September 1958	1 January 1980	Sold to Spain as Castilla (L-21), 17 January 1980
APA-249 / LPA-249	Francis Marion	New York Shipbuilding Corp.	?	13 February 1954	6 July 1961	1 January 1980	Sold to Spain as Aragón (L-22), 11 July 1980
