= USS LST-907 =

1944 LST-542-class tank landing ship

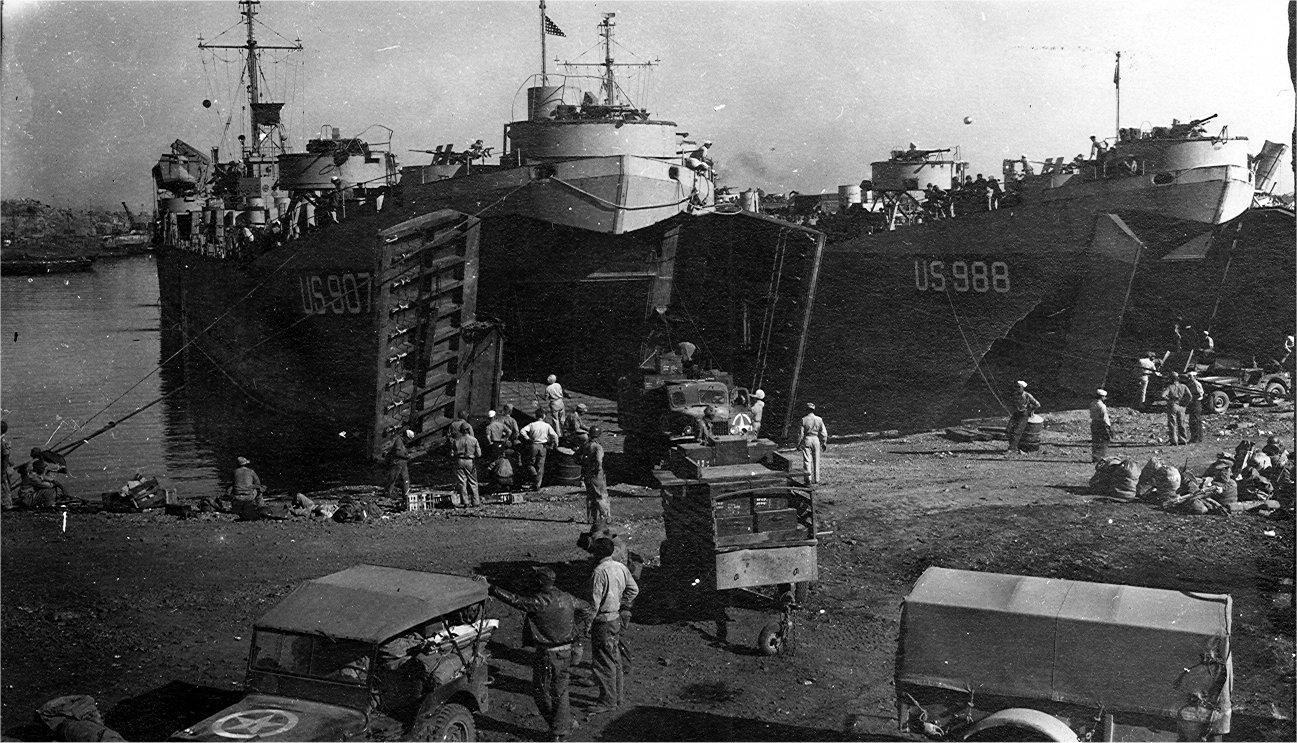
- USS LST-907 and USS LST-988 moored at Civitavecchia, Italy while loading the US Army Air Force's 523rd Fighter Squadron's ground crew and equipment for sea lift to Corsica, c. 13 July 1944.

History

United States
- Name: LST-907
- Builder: Bethlehem-Hingham Shipyard, Hingham, Massachusetts
- Yard number: 3377
- Laid down: 31 January 1944
- Launched: 18 March 1944
- Sponsored by: Miss Rosemary Leonard
- Commissioned: 30 April 1944
- Decommissioned: 18 October 1946
- Stricken: 25 November 1946
- Identification: Hull symbol: LST-907; Code letters: NVQA
- Honors and awards: 1 × battle star
- Fate: Transferred to the Venezuelan Navy, 25 November 1946

Venezuela
- Name: Capana
- Acquired: 25 November 1946
- Decommissioned: 1957
- Identification: Hull symbol: T-11 FNV
- Status: fate unknown

General characteristics
- Class & type: LST-542-class tank landing ship
- Displacement: 1,625 long tons (1,651 t) (light); 4,080 long tons (4,145 t) (full (seagoing draft with 1,675 short tons (1,520 t) load); 2,366 long tons (2,404 t) (beaching)
- Length: 328 ft (100 m) oa
- Beam: 50 ft (15 m)
- Draft: Unloaded: 2 ft 4 in (0.71 m) forward; 7 ft 6 in (2.29 m) aft; Full load: 8 ft 3 in (2.51 m) forward; 14 ft 1 in (4.29 m) aft; Landing with 500 short tons (450 t) load: 3 ft 11 in (1.19 m) forward; 9 ft 10 in (3.00 m) aft; Limiting 11 ft 2 in (3.40 m); Maximum navigation 14 ft 1 in (4.29 m)
- Installed power: 2 × 900 hp (670 kW) Electro-Motive Diesel 12-567A diesel engines; 1,800 shp (1,300 kW)
- Propulsion: 1 × Falk main reduction gears; 2 × Propellers
- Speed: 11.6 kn (21.5 km/h; 13.3 mph)
- Range: 24,000 nmi (44,000 km; 28,000 mi) at 9 kn (17 km/h; 10 mph) while displacing 3,960 long tons (4,024 t)
- Boats & landing craft carried: 2 x LCVPs
- Capacity: 1,600–1,900 short tons (3,200,000–3,800,000 lb; 1,500,000–1,700,000 kg) cargo depending on mission
- Troops: 16 officers, 147 enlisted men
- Complement: 13 officers, 104 enlisted men
- Armament: Varied, ultimate armament; 2 × twin 40 mm (1.57 in) Bofors guns; 4 × single 40 mm Bofors guns; 12 × 20 mm (0.79 in) Oerlikon cannons

USS LST-907 was an LST-542-class tank landing ship in the United States Navy. Like many of her class, she was not named and is properly referred to by her hull designation.

== Construction ==
LST-907 was laid down on 31 January 1944, at Hingham, Massachusetts, by the Bethlehem-Hingham Shipyard; launched on 18 March 1944; sponsored by Miss Rosemary Leonard; and commissioned on 30 April 1944.

== Service history ==
During World War II, LST-907 was assigned to the European Theatre and participated in the invasion of southern France in September 1944.

She was decommissioned on 18 October 1946. On 25 November 1946, the ship was delivered to and commissioned in the Venezuelan Navy and struck from the Navy list that same date.

She was renamed Capana and served until 1957 as a training ship.

== Awards ==
LST-907 earned one battle star for World War II service.

== Bibliography ==
Online resources

- "LST-907". Dictionary of American Naval Fighting Ships. Naval History and Heritage Command. 3 August 2015. This article incorporates text from this source, which is in the public domain.
- "Bethlehem-Hingham, Hingham MA". www.ShipbuildingHistory.com. 11 August 2011.
- "USS LST-907". NavSource. 26 September 2015.
