= Type 072II landing ship =

Chinese naval ship - amphibious warfare

Class overview
- Builders: China Shipbuilding Industry Corporation
- Operators: People's Liberation Army Navy
- Preceded by: Type 072
- Succeeded by: Type 072III
- In commission: 1993
- Completed: 4
- Retired: 4

General characteristics
- Type: Tank landing ship
- Displacement: 3,430 tonnes standard, 4,800 tonnes full load
- Length: 119.5 m (392 ft 1 in)
- Beam: 16.4 m (53 ft 10 in)
- Draught: 2.8 m (9 ft 2 in)
- Propulsion: 2 × 12PA6V-280MPC diesel engines
- Speed: 14 knots (26 km/h; 16 mph)
- Range: 3,000 nmi (5,600 km; 3,500 mi) at 14 kn
- Capacity: 250 troops or 10 tanks or 500 t cargo
- Complement: 104
- Armament: 1 × Type 66 twin 57 mm naval gun; 3 × Type 76 twin 37 mm naval gun
- Aviation facilities: Flight deck

The Type 072II landing ship (NATO designation Yuting class) are large landing ships built by Shanghai-based Hudong-Zhonghua Shipyard as a successor to the Type 072 landing ship. A total of four hulls have been delivered to the People's Liberation Army Navy (PLA Navy) since the early 1990s. The Type 072II is the PLA Navy's first amphibious warfare ship to have a flight deck for helicopter take-off/landing. There are three ships currently in People's Liberation Army service, all of which are deployed in East Sea Fleet of the PLA Navy (PLAN ESF). All active ships are built by China Shipbuilding Shipyard (中华造船厂) in Shanghai.

== Ships of the class ==
Number	Pennant number	Name	Builder	Launched	Commissioned	Fleet	Status
1	930	灵岩山 / Lingyan Shan	Zhonghua		26 December 1993	East Sea Fleet	Retired
2	931	洞庭山 / Dongting Shan	Zhonghua		June 1994	East Sea Fleet	Retired
3	932	贺兰山 / Helan Shan	Zhonghua		1994	East Sea Fleet	Retired
4	933	六盘山 / Liupan Shan	Zhonghua		1995	East Sea Fleet	Retired

== See also ==
- People's Liberation Army Navy Surface Force
- List of active People's Liberation Army Navy ships
