= HMAS Tarakan (L3017) =

1944 LST(3)-class tank landing ship

History

United Kingdom
- Name: LST 3017
- Builder: R & W. Hawthorn, Leslie & Co Ltd, Hebburn-on-Tyne, England
- Laid down: 7 April 1944
- Launched: 28 November 1944

History

Australia
- Name: LST 3017
- Commissioned: 4 July 1946
- Decommissioned: 1954
- Renamed: 16 December 1948
- Motto: "Nothing Daunts"
- Fate: Scrapped 1954

General characteristics
- Type: Mark III Tank Landing Ship
- Displacement: 2,300 tons
- Length: 347 ft (106 m)
- Beam: 55 ft 3 in (16.84 m)
- Draught: 12 ft 6 in (3.81 m)
- Speed: 13.5 knots (25.0 km/h; 15.5 mph)
- Armament: 4 × 40mm anti-aircraft guns; 16 × 20mm anti-aircraft guns

HMAS Tarakan (L3017) was a Mark III Tank Landing Ship, or LST(3), that served in the Royal Navy (RN) during 1945 and 1946 and Royal Australian Navy (RAN) from 1946 until 1954.

== History ==
The ship was laid down on 7 April 1944 for the RN by R. and W. Hawthorn, Leslie and Company at Hebburn-on-Tyne in England, launched on 28 November 1944 as LST 3017, and completed at Hendon Dockyard in Sutherland. She was commissioned into the RN on 9 June 1945.

The ship was one of six LSTs loaned to the RAN, commissioning on 4 July 1946. She was named Tarakan on 16 December 1948, and served in Australian and New Guinea waters as a general purpose vessel, but was mainly used for dumping condemned ammunition at sea. On 21 November 1947 nine soldiers were injured during an ammunition dumping operation when a box of fuses exploded while the ship was 20 miles (32 km) off the Sydney Heads.

On 25 January 1950, Tarakan was berthed alongside HMAS Kuttabul naval base at Garden Island in Sydney, making good defects prior to departure for New Guinea, when an explosion occurred aft under the mess decks. The explosion killed seven sailors and one dockyard tradesman, and injured twelve sailors and a second tradesman. The ship was extensively damaged. Tarakan's captain and executive officer were subsequently court martialed for negligence during March 1950, and were found not guilty. In April that year the coroner ruled that the explosion was accidental, and most likely caused by an electric arc from a fan in a compartment of the ship which had filled with petrol fumes.

Tarakan never returned to seagoing service following the incident in 1950. She was sold for breaking up on 12 March 1954. The ship caught fire again while she was being scrapped in the Sydney suburb of Balmain during September 1954, but damage was minimal and there were no serious injuries.
