= USS Wexford County =

Navy ship

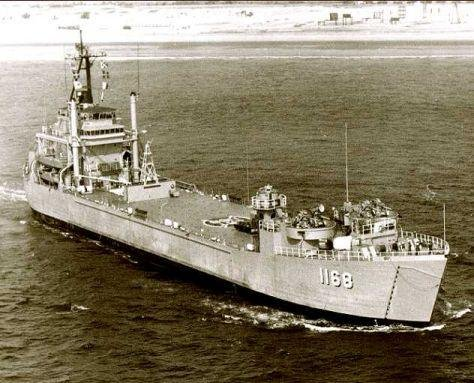
- USS Wexford County (LST-1168)

History

United States
- Name: USS Wexford County
- Namesake: Wexford County in Michigan
- Builder: Christy Corporation, Sturgeon Bay, Wisconsin
- Laid down: 27 February 1952
- Launched: 28 November 1953
- Commissioned: 15 June 1954
- Decommissioned: 29 October 1971
- Renamed: USS Wexford County 1 July 1955 (had been USS LST-1168)
- Stricken: 1 November 1976
- Honors and awards: A Meritorious Unit Commendation and five battle stars for Vietnam War service
- Fate: Sold to Spain 29 October 1971; Served in Spanish Navy 1971–1995; Sold for scrapping 1995

General characteristics
- Class & type: LST-1156-(Terrebonne Parish-) class landing ship tank
- Displacement: 2,590 tons (light); 5,800 tons (full)
- Length: 384 ft (117 m)
- Beam: 55 ft (17 m)
- Draft: 17 ft (5.2 m)
- Installed power: 6,000 shp (4.48 MW)
- Propulsion: Four General Motors 16-278A diesel engines, two controllable-pitch propellers
- Speed: 14 knots
- Boats & landing craft carried: 3 x landing craft, vehicle, personnel LCVPs, 1 x landing craft personnel (large) LCPL
- Troops: 395 (15 officers, 380 enlisted men)
- Complement: 205 (16 officers, 189 enlisted men)
- Armor: 3 × twin 3 in (76 mm) dual-purpose gun mounts; 5 × single 20 mm antiaircraft gun mounts

USS Wexford County (LST-1168), previously USS LST-1168, was a United States Navy landing ship tank (LST) in commission from 1953 to 1971, which saw service in the Atlantic, Caribbean, and Pacific and served in the Vietnam War.

== Construction and commissioning ==
USS LST-1168 was designed under project SCB 9A and laid down on 27 February 1952 by the Christy Corporation, Sturgeon Bay, Wisconsin. She was launched on 28 November 1953, sponsored by Mrs. Philip K. Wrigley, and commissioned on 15 June 1954.

== Atlantic and Caribbean service ==
Following commissioning, LST-1168 was assigned to the United States Atlantic Fleet with a home port at Norfolk, Virginia. She spent the remainder of 1954 in training, shakedown, upkeep, and independent ship exercises.

On 14 February 1955, LST-1168 departed Norfolk for a three-month tour of duty in the Caribbean, operating from the Vieques Island, Puerto Rico. While in the Caribbean, the ship visited San Juan and Ponce, Puerto Rico and St. Thomas, United States Virgin Islands. Upon returning to Norfolk in May, she engaged in exercises and spent the summer of 1955 on United States Naval Reserve cruises and midshipmen training exercises. Her name was changed from USS LST—1168 to USS Wexford County (LST-1168) on 1 July 1955.

In late 1955, Wexford County entered the Philadelphia Naval Shipyard at Philadelphia, Pennsylvania, for overhaul and remained there into April 1956. She completed overhaul and arrived at Naval Amphibious Base Little Creek, Virginia Beach, Virginia, on 4 April 1956. The ship then participated in United States East Coast operations until July 1956, when she deployed to the Caribbean. After stops at Vieques Island and Roosevelt Roads, Puerto Rico, she returned briefly to Little Creek, then set out for the United States West Coast via the Panama Canal.

== Pacific service ==
Wexford County arrived at Long Beach, California, on 2 September 1956 and spent the rest of 1956 conducting routine operations off the California coast.

In January 1957, Wexford County reported to Long Beach for overhaul and remained there until April 1957. She departed for San Francisco, California, on 4 April 1957 and entered an upkeep period which lasted until 20 June 1957. She arrived at San Diego, California, on 22 July 1957, where she continued operations along the California coast.

Wexford County departed for Pearl Harbor, Hawaii, and her first deployment to the Western Pacific on 23 January 1958 en route to Yokosuka, Japan. From Yokosuka, the ship made stops in Hong Kong; Sasebo, Japan; and Inchon, South Korea. On 24 June 1958, she left for San Diego and arrived there on 18 August 1958. After several months of activity, she went into upkeep on 5 December 1958 at Long Beach.

On 29 January 1959, Wexford County departed for Yokosuka again via Hong Kong and Okinawa. She arrived at Yokosuka on 24 March 1959. The ship made several shuttles between Yokosuka and Sasebo, Japan, and Naha, Okinawa. She left Yokosuka for San Diego, arriving there on 7 June 1959. The remainder of 1959 was spent in exercises off the coast and routine upkeep.

During the next several years, Wexford County was involved in numerous routine operations along the California coast. A highlight of these years was a deployment to Guam, for which she departed San Diego on 2 January 1962. After steaming 5,480 nautical miles (10,149 kilometers), she arrived on 23 January 1962. She conducted operations for reconnaissance and installation of weather stations in the eastern Caroline Islands. The ship returned to San Diego on 1 September 1962. On 10 July 1963, she commenced overhaul at the Naval Station in San Diego, California, which lasted through late November 1963.

January and February 1964 found Wexford County engaged in training. She was in a restricted availability status during March and April 1964. In May, she participated in Exercise Pine Tree, in which she served as a secondary control ship. During July 1964, she was in landing ship tank training. This was followed by Exercise Sea Bar, held near Fort Lewis, Washington, in conjunction with the United States Army. In this exercise, Wexford County acted as primary control ship. Returning to San Diego in mid-September, Wexford County entered upkeep for several weeks. She then took part in amphibious exercises with United States Marine Corps forces. Upon completion of various training exercises, the ship entered a Christmas holiday upkeep period.

Wexford County was subjected to simulated chemical weapon attacks in January and February 1965 under Project SHAD.

Also in early 1965, Wexford County took part in Operation Bubble Ops and Operation Silver Lance, which were at that time the largest peacetime amphibious operations ever conducted in the Pacific Ocean. Shortly after, she departed for Okinawa and Yokosuka, Japan. Following a brief stay, she sailed in early May 1965 for San Diego. During June and July 1965, she carried out local operations.

== Vietnam War service ==
In August 1965, Wexford County again deployed for the Western Pacific and spent September 1965 in Da Nang, South Vietnam. Subsequent stops were made in Chu Lai and Qui Nhon, South Vietnam, and at Hong Kong. In December 1965, Wexford County returned to San Diego for the duration of the year.

Wexford County was involved in local operations from January through April 1966 and provided services for the Amphibious School, Coronado, California. In late April, she steamed to Newport, Oregon, to participate in Newport's Loyalty Day celebration. On 1 May 1966, Wexford County returned to San Diego. On 12 July 1966, she arrived at the Long Beach Naval Shipyard in Long Beach, California, for overhaul. She returned to San Diego on 9 November 1966 and began underway and refresher training on 27 November 1966. This training period ended on 16 December 1966.

Amphibious training for Wexford County commenced on 16 January 1967 and continued through 27 January 1967. She briefly returned to Long Beach for further repair, then continued on to Hawaii to participate in landing exercises on Moloka'i and to lift U.S. Marine Corps forces to San Diego. In June 1967, Wexford County sailed to San Francisco, California; Portland, Oregon; and Seattle, Washington, to embark U.S. Marine Corps troops bound for training at Camp Pendleton, California. She participated in various operations during July 1967, and, in late August, she repeated her stops along the United States West Coast to return Marine Corps units to their respective home ports.

After returning to San Diego in September 1967, Wexford County began a tender availability period. Amphibious exercises and deployment preparations lasted through October 1967. In early November 1967, she sailed for South Vietnam by way of Pearl Harbor and Yokosuka. In December 1967, Wexford County reached South Vietnam and assumed her duties.

On 4 January 1968, Wexford County arrived in Subic Bay, the Philippines, to off-load cargo and departed on 14 January 1968 to return to South Vietnam. She remained on station until 13 March 1968, at which time she left for Subic Bay, arriving there on 16 March 1968. She returned to Vietnam, via Hong Kong, on 5 April 1968 to rejoin forces off Vietnam.

Wexford County left Vietnam in early May 1968 and returned to San Diego via Taiwan, Yokosuka, and Pearl Harbor. She arrived in San Diego on 26 June 1968, after approximately seven and one-half months overseas. For the next two months, she was in a restricted availability status.

On 28 August 1968, she got underway for South Bend, Washington, to help celebrate the city's Labor Day festival. She returned to San Diego on 6 September 1968. Throughout September and October 1968, Wexford County carried out operations along the California coast. On 15 November 1968, she entered drydock at San Diego.

Wexford County got underway on 12 January 1969 with a task group headed for Mazatlán, Mexico, arriving on 18 January 1969. She spent two weeks there involved in various training exercises. In February and March 1969, Wexford County was again in San Diego for routine maintenance. She departed for exercises at Treasure Island, California, on 14 April 1969. She sustained heavy damage to a main engine and spent May 1969 undergoing repairs at San Diego.

A midshipmen cruise occupied the months of June and July 1969. August and September 1969 were devoted to exercises, and Wexford County spent the rest of 1969 in overhaul at San Diego.

The yard period ended on 20 February 1970. Inspections, training, and preparations for deployment occurred from March through May 1970; and, on 2 June 1970, the ship left for Pearl Harbor and Guam. Wexford County reached Guam on 25 June 1970, and, after taking on new cargo, she left for Subic Bay, Philippines, and then to Vietnam. After unloading a construction battalion and their equipment, she departed for Hong Kong, arriving there on 30 July 1970.

From 2 September 1970 through early November 1970, Wexford County was involved in numerous troop lifts, cargo transports, and exercises between Okinawa and Yokosuka and Numazu, Japan. On 2 November 1970, she detached and began the voyage back to San Diego via Subic Bay, Guam, Ponape, the Caroline Islands, and Pearl Harbor. She arrived at San Diego on 22 December 1970.

Wexford County received a Meritorious Unit Commendation and five battle stars for her Vietnam War service.

== Decommissioning and transfer to Spain ==
Wexford County spent 1971 in preparation for transfer to Spain. She was decommissioned on 29 October 1971 and transferred to the Spanish Navy through the Security Assistance Program that same day, although she was not stricken from the Navy List until 1 November 1976.

In the Spanish Navy, she served as Martin Alvarez (L 12) from 1971 until 1995, when she was decommissioned and sold for scrapping.

== See also ==
- List of United States Navy LSTs
