= List of ship commissionings in 2020 =

The list of ship commissionings in 2020 includes a chronological list of all ships commissioned in 2020.

	Operator	Ship	Class and type	Pennant	Other notes
5 March	Japan Maritime Self-Defense Force	Ōryū	Sōryū-class submarine	SS-511	For Japanese Navy
19 March	Japan Maritime Self-Defense Force	Maya	Maya-class destroyer	DDG-179	For Japanese Navy
4 April	United States Navy	Delaware	Virginia-class attack submarine	SSN-791	For U.S. Navy
18 April	United States Navy	Vermont	Virginia-class attack submarine	SSN-792	For U.S. Navy
20 June	United States Navy	Kansas City	Independence-class littoral combat ship	LCS-22	For U.S. Navy
15 July	United States Navy	Tripoli	America-class amphibious assault ship	LHA-7	For U.S. Navy
3 August	Royal Navy	Trent	River-class offshore patrol vessel	P224	For Royal Navy
8 August	United States Navy	St. Louis	Freedom-class littoral combat ship	LCS-19	For U.S. Navy
26 September	United States Navy	Delbert D. Black	Arleigh Burke-class destroyer	DDG-119	For U.S. Navy
19 November	(Iran) Navy of the Islamic Revolutionary Guard Corps	Shahid Roudaki		L110–1	
7 December	Indonesian Navy	Teluk Kendari	Teluk Bintuni-class tank landing ship	518	
7 December	Indonesian Navy	Teluk Kupang	Teluk Bintuni-class tank landing ship	519	
17 December	Royal Navy	Tamar	River-class offshore patrol vessel	P233	For Royal Navy
23 December	Russian Navy	Pyotr Morgunov	Ivan Gren-class landing ship	117	For Russian Navy
