= KRI Teluk Wondama =

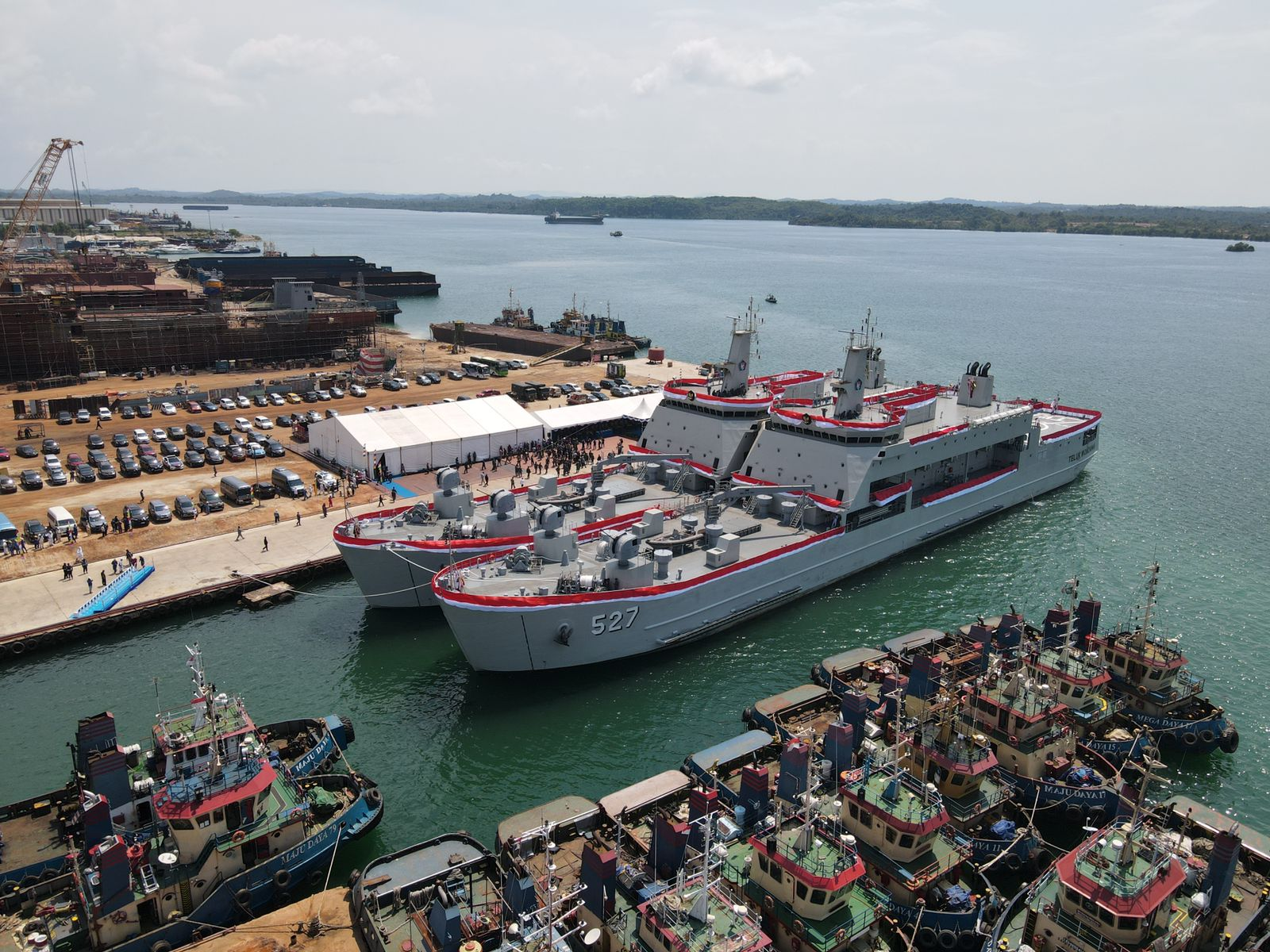
- KRI Teluk Wondama and KRI Teluk Weda in Batam on 26 October 2021

History

Indonesia
- Name: Teluk Wondama
- Namesake: Wondama Bay
- Ordered: 12 April 2019
- Builder: PT Bandar Abadi Shipyard, Batam
- Yard number: AT-9
- Laid down: 19 December 2019
- Launched: 27 February 2021
- Commissioned: 26 October 2021
- Identification: Pennant number: 527
- Status: In active service

General characteristics
- Class & type: Teluk Bintuni-class tank landing ship
- Displacement: 2,300 tons
- Length: 117 m (383 ft 10 in)
- Beam: 16.4 m (53 ft 10 in)
- Height: 11 m (36 ft 1 in)
- Propulsion: 2 x 3,285 kW (4,405 hp) main engines
- Speed: 16 knots (30 km/h; 18 mph) (max); 13 knots (24 km/h; 15 mph) (cruise)
- Range: 6,240 nmi (11,560 km; 7,180 mi)
- Boats & landing craft carried: 4 unit LCVPs; 1 unit RIB 10 m rubber boat; 2 unit RIB 7 m rubber boat
- Capacity: 10 unit Leopard 2A4 main battle tanks or 15 unit BMP-3F infantry fighting vehicles
- Troops: 367
- Complement: 111 crew
- Armament: 2 x Bofors 40 mm/L70 guns 2 x 12.7 mm machine guns
- Aircraft carried: 2 x helicopters

KRI Teluk Wondama (527) is the ninth Teluk Bintuni-class tank landing ship of the Indonesian Navy.

== Characteristics ==
Teluk Wondama has a length of 117 metres (383 ft 10 in) and a beam of 16.4 metres (53 ft 10 in), with a top speed of 16 knots (30 km/h; 18 mph) and a cruising speed of 13 knots (24 km/h; 15 mph). She has a capacity of 367 troops, with complement of 111, in addition to ten Leopard main battle tanks or fifteen BMP-3F amphibious infantry fighting vehicles. Teluk Wondama also has two helipads with two hangars.

== Service history ==
KRI Teluk Wondama was built by PT Bandar Abadi Shipyard, Batam. The ship was ordered on 12 April 2019, part of two ships contract of 360 billion Indonesian Rupiah (25.5 million US Dollar). Her keel was laid down on 19 December and she was assigned with yard number of AT-9.

Teluk Wondama, along with her sister Teluk Weda were launched on 27 February 2021, and officially named on 3 March. The ships were launched 8 months ahead of the scheduled 30 months, with the Chief of Staff of the Indonesian Navy Admiral Yudo Margono remarked during the ship naming ceremony that he should have invited Jaya Suprana, the founder of Indonesian World Records Museum, as according to him it's "..an achievement that must be carved into MURI".

Teluk Wondama and Teluk Weda were commissioned on 26 October 2021 at PT Bandar Abadi shipyard in Batam, after they were handed over ceremonially by Minister of Defense Prabowo Subianto to Chief of Staff of the Indonesian Navy Admiral Yudo Margono. The ship was assigned to the 3rd Fleet Command based in Sorong on 11 January 2023.
