= KRI Teluk Lada =

Tank landing ship of the Indonesian Navy

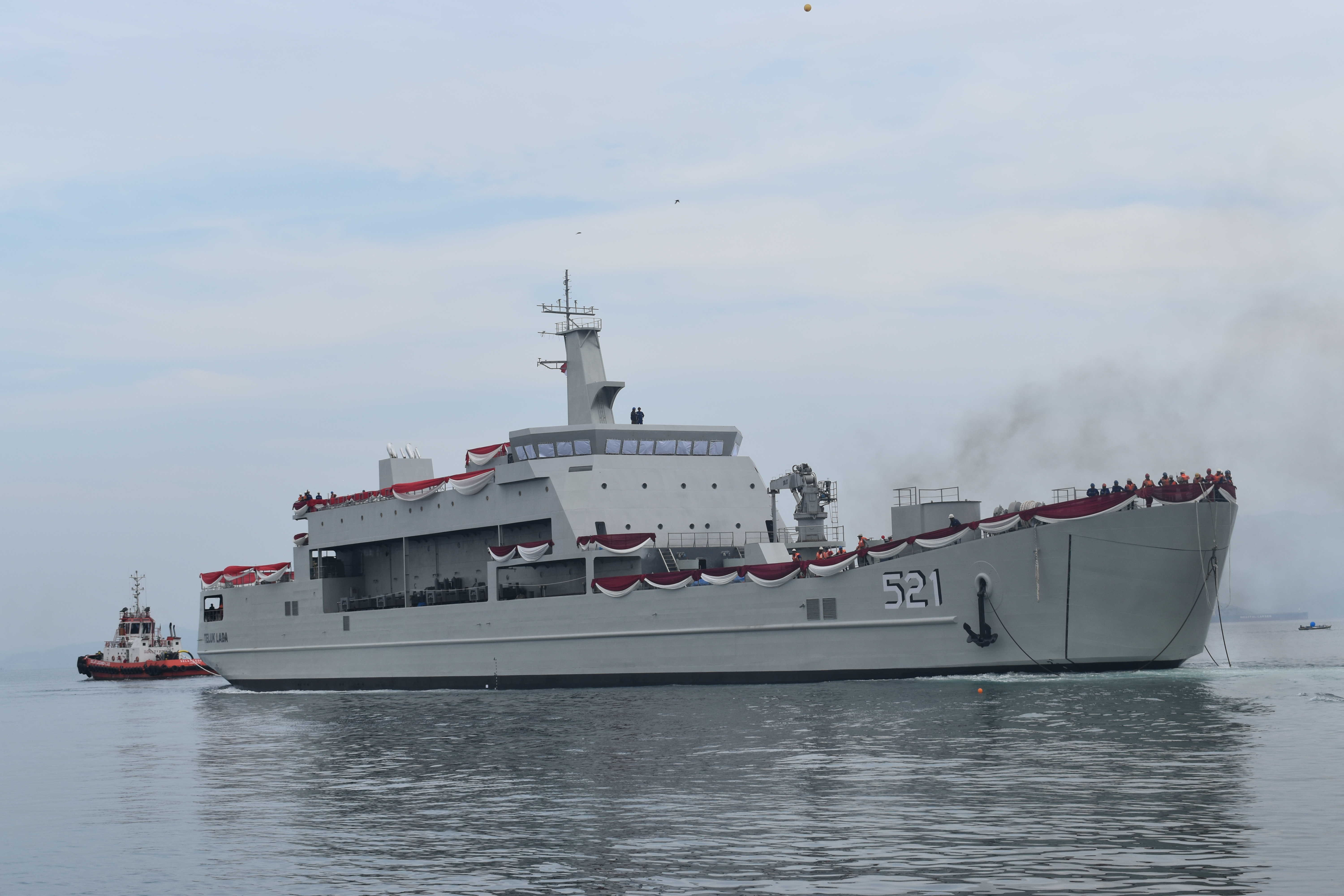
- KRI Teluk Lada during her launching ceremony

History

Indonesia
- Name: Teluk Lada
- Namesake: Lada Bay (id)
- Ordered: 23 December 2015
- Builder: PT Daya Radar Utama, Lampung
- Launched: 28 June 2018
- Commissioned: 26 February 2019
- Identification: Hull number: 521; MMSI number: 525114002; Callsign: YBTW2
- Status: Active

General characteristics
- Class & type: Teluk Bintuni-class tank landing ship
- Displacement: 2,300 tons
- Length: 117 m (383 ft 10 in)
- Beam: 16.4 m (53 ft 10 in)
- Height: 11 m (36 ft 1 in)
- Propulsion: 2 x 3,285 kW (4,405 hp) main engines
- Speed: 16 knots (30 km/h; 18 mph) (max); 13 knots (24 km/h; 15 mph) (cruise)
- Range: 6,240 nmi (11,560 km; 7,180 mi)
- Boats & landing craft carried: 4 unit LCVPs; 1 unit RIB 10 m rubber boat; 2 unit RIB 7 m rubber boat
- Capacity: 10 unit Leopard 2A4 main battle tanks or 15 unit BMP-3F infantry fighting vehicles
- Troops: 365
- Complement: 109 crew and 6 helicopter crew
- Armament: 2 x Bofors 40 mm/L70 guns 2 x 12.7 mm machine guns
- Aircraft carried: 2 x helicopters

KRI Teluk Lada (521) is a tank landing ship of the Indonesian Navy. She is the fourth ship in the Teluk Bintuni class of tank landing ships.

== Characteristics ==
Teluk Lada has a length of 117 metres (383 ft 10 in) and a beam of 16.4 metres (53 ft 10 in), with a top speed of 16 knots (30 km/h; 18 mph) and a cruising speed of 13 knots (24 km/h; 15 mph). She has a capacity of 478 passengers, including her crew of 109 and a helicopter crew of 6, in addition to ten Leopard main battle tanks. Teluk Lada also has two helipads with two hangars.

== Service history ==
The ship was built as the fourth ship in the Teluk Bintuni class of tank landing ships, and was the second ship to be built by PT Daya Radar Utama (DRU), after the class' namesake Teluk Bintuni. She was launched on 28 June 2018 in DRU's shipyard in Lampung, and was received and commissioned by the Indonesian Navy on 26 February 2019. She was then assigned to the 3rd Fleet Command.

In August 2019, Teluk Lada was dispatched to rescue hostages aboard MV Mina Sejati, a 36-crew squid fishing vessel which was hijacked by several members of her own crew off Tual, Maluku. Mina Sejati was later discovered empty by Teluk Lada, with eleven survivors testifying that three of the crew had massacred the others.
