= Blagonravov =

Blagonravov (Russian: Благонравов) is an artificial Russian surname originated in clergy, derived from the words "blago-" ('good') +"-nrav" ('nature') and given to a clerical student as an epithet for his good-naturedness. The feminine form is Blagonravova (Russian: Благонравова). People with this name include:

- Aleksandr Aleksandrovich Blagonravov (1933–2020), Soviet and Russian military engineer and tank designer
- Aleksandr Ivanovich Blagonravov (1906–1962), Soviet military engineer and tank designer
- Anatoli Blagonravov (1895–1975), Soviet aerospace engineer and diplomat
- Georgy Blagonravov, Russian revolutionary and Soviet official
