= Aleksandr Ivanovich Blagonravov =

Soviet engineer and designer

- Born: 1 August [O.S. 19 July] 1906; Khitrovo, Tambov Governorate, Russian Empire
- Died: 28 May 1962 (aged 55); Moscow, Soviet Union
- Resting place: Novodevichy Cemetery
- Children: Aleksandr Aleksandrovich Blagonravov
- Engineering career
- Discipline: Military engineering Armoured vehicle design
- Projects: T-34; IS-2
- Awards: Order of Lenin; Order of the Red Star; Medal "For Battle Merit"; Stalin Prize, 2nd Class

Aleksandr Ivanovich Blagonravov (Russian: Александр Иванович Благонравов; 1 August [O.S. 19 July] 1906 – 28 May 1962) was a Soviet military engineer and designer who worked on the designs of armoured vehicles prior to, during, and after the Second World War.

Blagonravov began his military career by joining the Red Army and studied at the F. E. Dzerzhinsky Military Technical Academy, afterwards embarking on a career working in teaching and the designs of armoured vehicles. His work included the epicyclic gearing mechanisms employed on the T-34 and IS-2 tank designs, the latter work winning him the Stalin Prize in 1943. He took up leadership roles in the People's Commissariat of Defence of the Soviet Union towards the end of the war, later serving in the Scientific-Tank Committee in the Ministry of Defence's Main Armoured Directorate, and as Head of the Tank Department of the Military Academy of Mechanization and Motorization of the Red Army.

Blagonravov wrote a number of academic works, was a Candidate of Technical Sciences, and a docent, while reaching the rank of Engineer Lieutenant General. He was also a corresponding member of the Academy of Artillery Science. He had received several awards, including the Order of the Red Star, the Order of Lenin, and the Medal "For Battle Merit", prior to his death in 1962. His son, Aleksandr Aleksandrovich Blagonravov, followed in his father's footsteps, serving as chief designer of Kurganmashzavod and playing an important role in the development of the BMP-2 and BMP-3 infantry fighting vehicles.

== Early life and design work ==
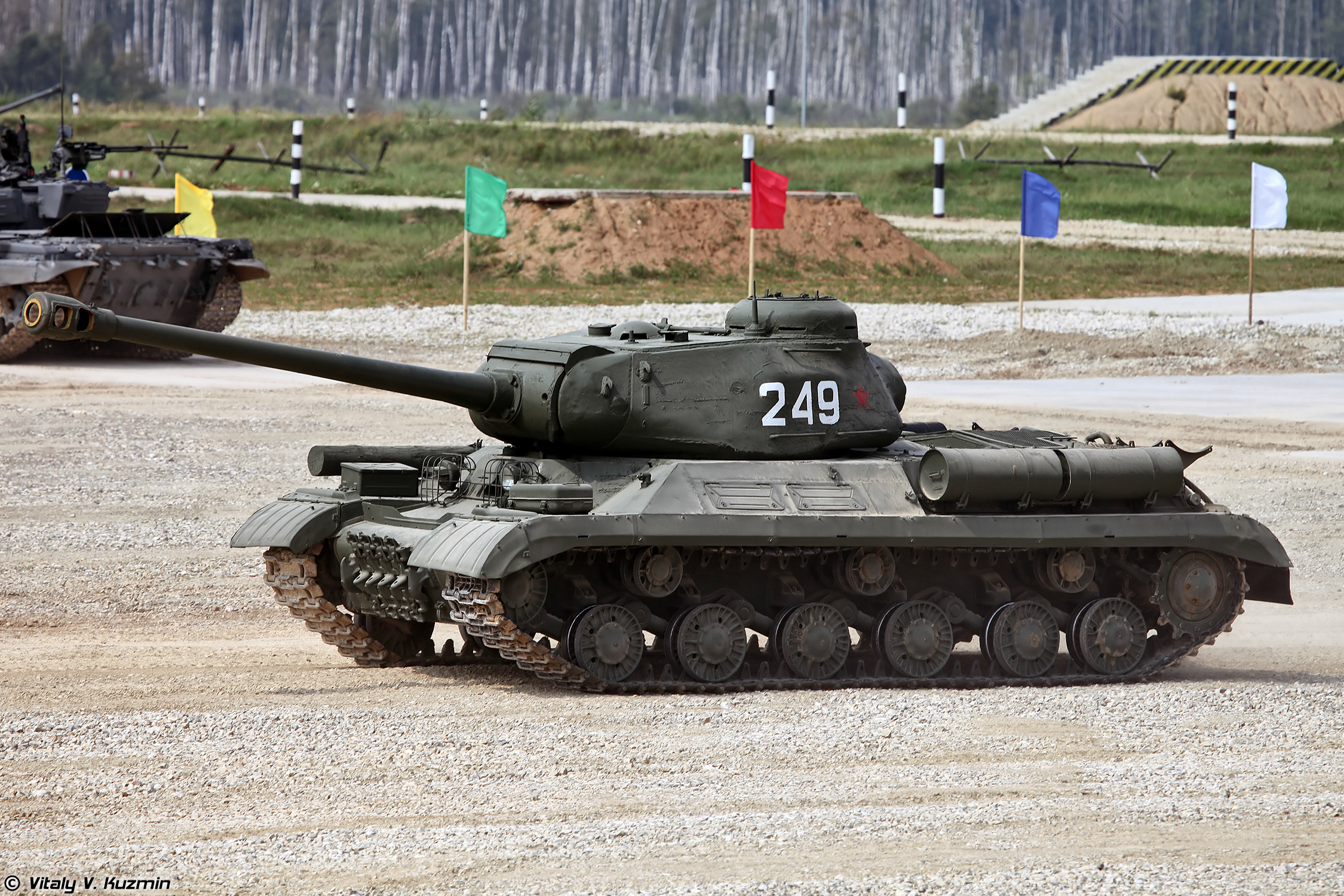
An IS-2 tank. Blagonravov's work on the design won him the Stalin Prize in 1943.

Blagonravov was born on 1 August [O.S. 19 July] 1906 in the village of Khitrovo, then part of Tambov Governorate, in the Russian Empire. He joined the Communist Party in 1929, and served in the Red Army from 1930. After studying at the F. E. Dzerzhinsky Military Technical Academy, he graduated in 1932 and began teaching and carrying out research. Alongside Mikhail Danchenko he developed the epicyclic gearing used in the T-34 tank, and participated in the development of the IS-2 heavy tank, creating a two-stage planetary rotation mechanism for the tank's engines. From 1944 onwards was part of the leadership of the People's Commissariat of Defence of the Soviet Union. He was awarded the Stalin Prize in 1943 after the People's Commissar for Tank Industry Ivan Zaltsman wrote to the prize committee, requesting the prize for the "Creation of the KV-1S heavy tank". Credited alongside Blagonravov, listed at this period of his career as an engineer-podpolkovnik and teacher at the I. V. Stalin Military Academy of Mechanization and Motorization, were Nikolai Dukhov, Afanasy Yermolaev, Nikolai Shashmurin, Leonid Sychev, German Mikhailovich, Aleksandr Sternin, Yevgeny Dedov, Nikolai Sinyov and Abram Lesokhin.

== Leadership roles and teaching ==
Blagonravov later became chairman of the Scientific-Tank Committee of the Main Armoured Directorate of the Ministry of Defence, and between 1959 and 1962 was head of the Directorate. Between 1951 and 1954 he was Head of the Tank Department of the Military Academy of Mechanization and Motorization of the Red Army.

Blagonravov co-wrote several works on tank design and operation and was the author of the 1940 work Tanks and Tractors: Design and Construction (Russian: Танки и тракторы: Расчет и конструкции). He was a Candidate of Technical Sciences, and docent, reaching the rank of Engineer Lieutenant General. He was a corresponding member of the Academy of Artillery Science from 14 April 1947.

Blagonravov died in Moscow on 28 May 1962 and was buried in the Novodevichy Cemetery. Over his career he had received the Order of the Red Star on 22 February 1941, the Order of Lenin on 13 September 1945, and the Medal "For Battle Merit".

== Family ==
Blagonravov married Elizaveta Alekseevna Zvereva (1905–1991), a lieutenant colonel, head of production workshops, and a lecturer at the Military Armoured Forces Academy. On her death in 1991, she was buried beside her husband in the Novodevichy Cemetery. Their son, Aleksandr Aleksandrovich Blagonravov, followed in his father's footsteps, serving as chief designer of Kurganmashzavod and playing an important role in the development of the BMP-2 and BMP-3 infantry fighting vehicles.
