= Makan bajamba =

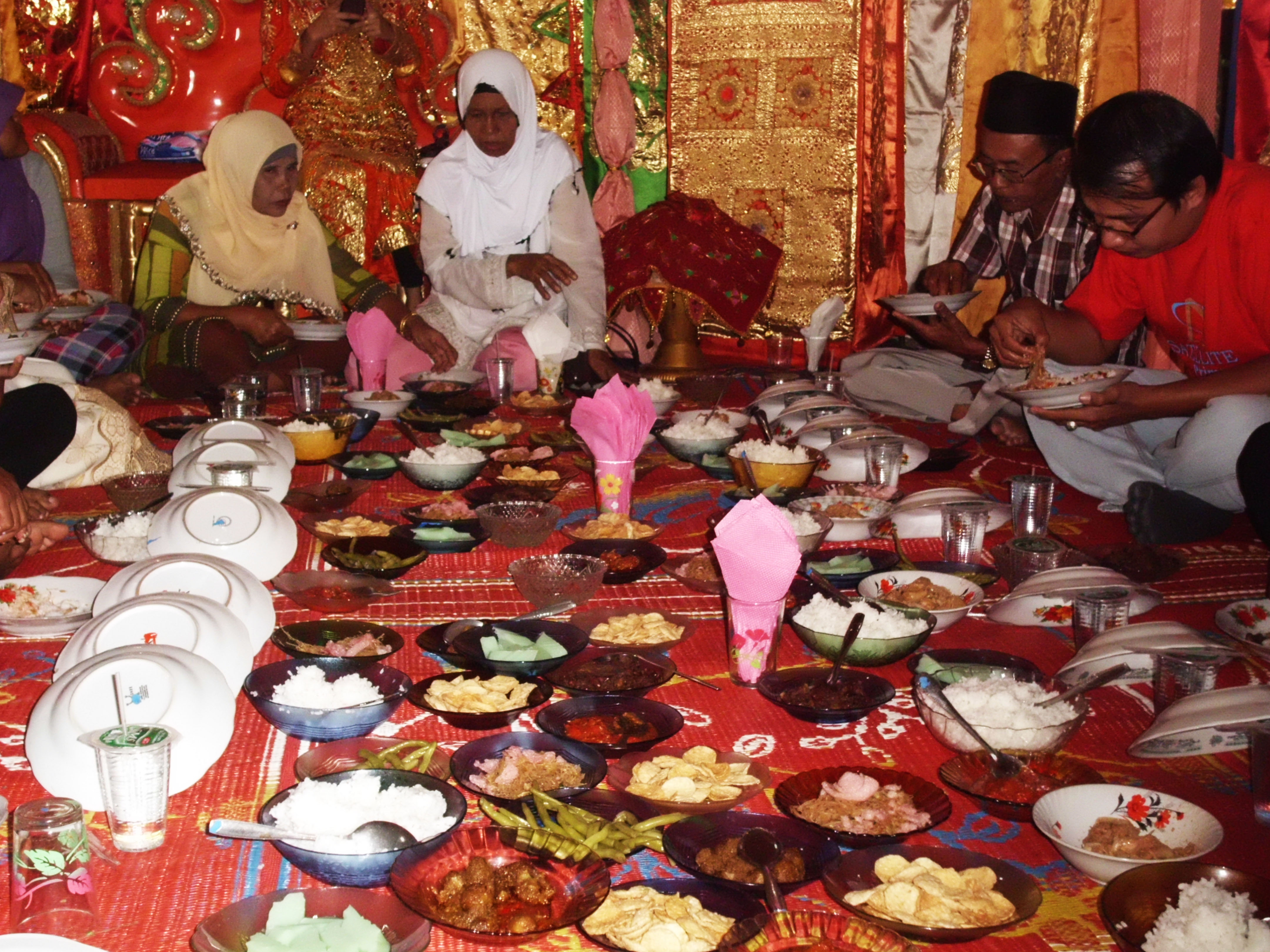
People eating makan bajamba

Makan bajamba (from the Minangkabau language) is the traditional communal meal, shared from one container, and procession of dining on low tables set upon the floor; it is a tradition of the Minangkabau people that has existed since the founding of Islam and is conducted at ceremonial events, holidays, festivals, and important gatherings. Various Minangkabau foods are served in the procession, which is carried in by female participants on their head. That foods are all laid out on metallic trays and then placed on the low tables and consumed while sitting on the floor. This procession opens with the performance of Minangkabau arts and begins with the recitation of traditional Minangkabau proverbs as well as proverbs from the Koran by elders and leaders. Literally, makan bajamba means eating together; it facilitates a sense of togetherness regardless of status of the participants.

A 2006 procession that celebrated the 123rd anniversary of the town of Sawahlunto, received an award from the MURI (Indonesian Record Museum) in the category of the longest and most participants in a makan bajamba procession (16,123 people).
