= KRI Teluk Calang =

History

Indonesia
- Name: Teluk Calang
- Namesake: Calang Bay
- Ordered: January 2017
- Builder: PT Daya Radar Utama, Lampung
- Yard number: AT-7
- Laid down: 10 July 2017
- Launched: 19 August 2019
- Commissioned: 8 August 2022
- Identification: Pennant number: 524
- Status: Active

General characteristics
- Class & type: Teluk Bintuni-class tank landing ship
- Displacement: 2,300 tons
- Length: 117 m (383 ft 10 in)
- Beam: 16.4 m (53 ft 10 in)
- Height: 11 m (36 ft 1 in)
- Draft: 3 m (9 ft 10 in)
- Propulsion: 2 x 3,285 kW (4,405 hp) main engines
- Speed: 16 knots (30 km/h; 18 mph)
- Range: 7,200 nmi (13,300 km; 8,300 mi)
- Endurance: 20 days
- Boats & landing craft carried: 4 LCVPs
- Capacity: 10 Leopard 2 main battle tanks or; 14 BMP-3F infantry fighting vehicles or; 45 troop transport vehicles
- Troops: 361
- Complement: 113 ship crew; 6 helicopter crew
- Armament: 1 x Bofors 40 mm/L70 guns 1 x Oerlikon 20 mm cannon 2 x 12.7 mm machine guns
- Aircraft carried: 2 x helicopters

KRI Teluk Calang (524) is a Teluk Bintuni-class tank landing ship of the Indonesian Navy.

== Characteristics ==
Teluk Calang has a length of 117 metres (383 ft 10 in), a beam measuring 16.4 metres (53 ft 10 in), and a height of 7.8 metres (25 ft 7 in) with a draft of 3 metres (9 ft 10 in). She has a capacity of 476 passengers, including crew, alongside 10 Leopard main battle tanks and a helicopter. The ship was designed to be able to stay at sea for 20 days. With a crew of 119, consisting of 113 sailors and 6 helicopter crew, she has a displacement of 2,300 tonnes and has a maximum speed of 16 knots (30 km/h; 18 mph). The ship is armed with light defensive weapons in form of a Bofors 40 mm gun and two 12.7 mm heavy machine guns. The vessel could also carry four LCVP boats, and is equipped with a crane for cargo loading and offloading.

== Service history ==
KRI Teluk Calang was built by an Indonesian shipbuilder PT Daya Radar Utama (DRU), Bandar Lampung. The ship was ordered from DRU as part of a three-ship order of the Teluk Bintuni-class ships (AT-117 type LST program) in January 2017, with yard number of AT-7. The ship was laid down on 10 July 2017, along with two other ships, AT-5 and AT-6. She was launched and officially named on 19 August 2019. The ship was commissioned on 8 August 2022.
