= KRI Teluk Kendari =

History

Indonesia
- Name: Teluk Kendari
- Namesake: Kendari Bay
- Ordered: 2012
- Builder: PT Dok & Perkapalan Kodja Bahari (Persero), Jakarta
- Yard number: AT-1
- Laid down: 31 July 2012
- Launched: 26 September 2014
- Commissioned: 7 December 2020
- Home port: Surabaya
- Identification: Pennant number: 518
- Status: Active

General characteristics
- Class & type: Teluk Bintuni-class tank landing ship
- Displacement: 2,300 tons
- Length: 117 m (383 ft 10 in)
- Beam: 16.4 m (53 ft 10 in)
- Height: 7.8 m (25 ft 7 in)
- Propulsion: 2 x 3,285 kW (4,405 hp) main engines
- Speed: 16 knots (30 km/h; 18 mph)
- Boats & landing craft carried: 4 unit LCVPs; 1 unit RIB 10 m rubber boat; 2 unit RIB 7 m rubber boat
- Capacity: 10 unit Leopard 2A4 main battle tanks or 10 unit BMP-3F IFVs and 1 PT-76 light tank
- Troops: 365
- Complement: 109 crew and 6 helicopter crew
- Armament: 2 x Bofors 40 mm L/70 guns 2 x 12.7 mm machine guns
- Aircraft carried: 1 x Bell 412 helicopter

KRI Teluk Kendari (518) is the first Teluk Bintuni-class tank landing ship of the Indonesian Navy.

== Characteristics ==
Teluk Kendari has a length of 117 metres (383 ft 10 in), beam of 16.4 metres (53 ft 10 in) and height of 7.8 metres (25 ft 7 in) with a speed of 16 knots (30 km/h; 18 mph). She has a capacity of 478 passengers, including her crew of 109 and a helicopter crew of 6, in addition to ten Leopard main battle tanks or ten BMP-3F infantry fighting vehicles and one PT-76 amphibious tank. Teluk Kendari also has a helipad with hangar and capable of carrying a Bell 412 helicopter.

== Service history ==
KRI Teluk Kendari was built by an Indonesian state-owned shipbuilder PT Dok & Perkapalan Kodja Bahari (Persero), Jakarta. The ship was ordered in 2012, based on AT-117M design that would become the Teluk Bintuni-class ships. Her building process was ceremonially begun with the first steel-cutting on 31 July 2012, and she was assigned with yard number of AT-1.

She was launched and officially named on 26 September 2014. She was planned to be the first ship in her class, but due to internal problems faced by the shipbuilder, her construction was delayed and the third ship of the class was completed first instead. She was transferred to the Navy and commissioned on 7 December 2020, with Sea Lieutenant Colonel Erpandrio Trio as her first commanding officer. She was assigned to Eastern Fleet Command, based at Surabaya.
