= Teluk Bintuni-class tank landing ship =

Indonesian tank landing ship class

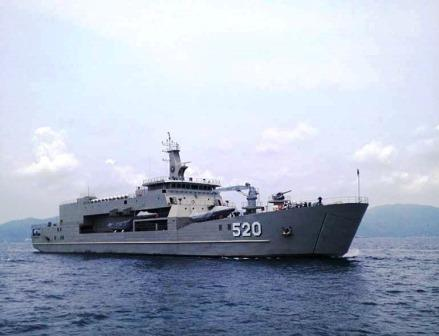
- KRI Teluk Bintuni

Class overview
- Name: Teluk Bintuni class
- Builders: PT Dok & Perkapalan Kodja Bahari (Persero); PT Daya Radar Utama; PT Bandar Abadi Shipyard
- Operators: Indonesian Navy
- Preceded by: Teluk Gilimanuk class
- Cost: US$ 16 million per unit
- Built: 2012-present
- In service: 2015–present
- Planned: 12
- Completed: 9
- Active: 9

General characteristics
- Type: Landing ship tank
- Displacement: 2,300 tons
- Length: 117–120 m (383 ft 10 in – 393 ft 8 in)
- Beam: 16–18 m (52 ft 6 in – 59 ft 1 in)
- Height: 11 m (36 ft 1 in)
- Propulsion: 2 x 3,285 kW (4,405 hp) main engines
- Speed: 16 knots (30 km/h; 18 mph)
- Range: 6,240 nmi (11,560 km; 7,180 mi) at 12 knots (22 km/h; 14 mph)
- Capacity: 10 unit Leopard 2A4 main battle tanks or 15 unit BMP-3F infantry fighting vehicles; 4 unit LCVPs; 1 unit RIB 10 m rubber boat; 2 unit RIB 7 m rubber boat
- Troops: 361
- Complement: 119 total
- Armament: 117 meters variant: 2 x Bofors 40 mm/L70 guns 2 x 12.7 mm machine guns; 120 meters variant: 1 x OTO Marlin 40 guns 1 x 20 mm cannon 2 x 12.7 mm machine guns
- Aircraft carried: 2 x 10-ton helicopter

The Teluk Bintuni class, Indonesian designation AT-117M is a class of tank landing ships that is being built indigenously for the Indonesian Navy by various Indonesian local shipyards. It was announced that the Indonesian Navy intends to acquire a total of twelve vessels of the same class with some modifications from the lead ship to improve ship's capability.

== Design ==
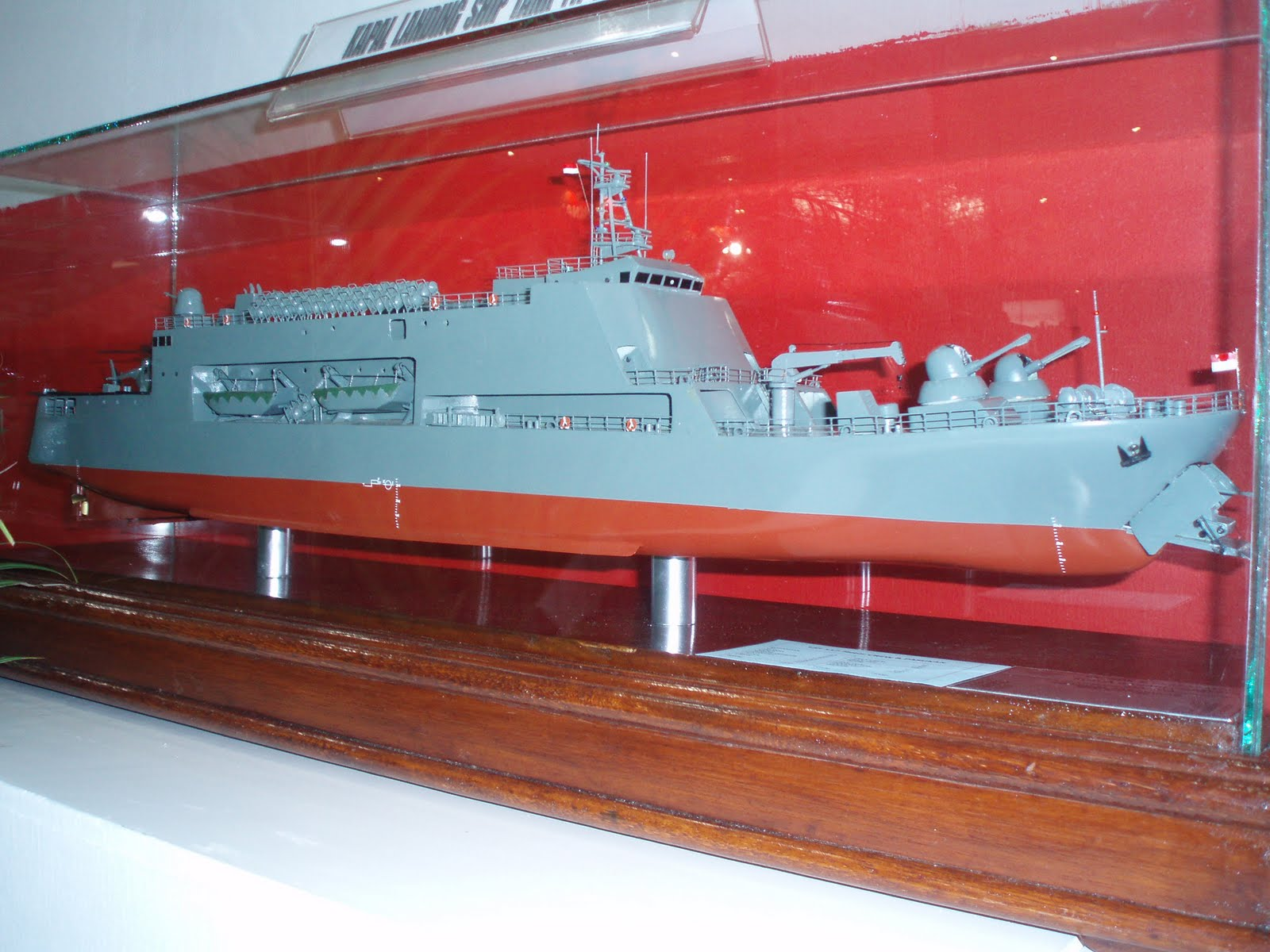
LST 117 Meter mock-up design.

Teluk Bintuni has a length of 120 metres (393 ft 8 in), a beam measuring 18 metres (59 ft 1 in), and a height of 7.8 metres (25 ft 7 in) with a draft of 3 metres (9 ft 10 in). She has a capacity of 476 passengers, including crew, alongside 10 Leopard 2 main battle tanks and a helicopter. The ship was designed to be able to stay at sea for 20 days.

With a crew of 119, consisting of 113 sailors and 6 helicopter crew, she has a displacement of 2,300 tonnes and has a maximum speed of 16 knots (30 km/h; 18 mph). The ship is armed with light defensive weapons in form of a Bofors 40 mm gun and two 12.7 mm heavy machine guns.

The vessel could also carry four LCVP boats, and is equipped with a crane for cargo loading and offloading.

== Ships ==
Name	Hull no.	Builder	Laid down	Launched	Commissioned	Status
120M variant with hangar
Teluk Bintuni	520	PT Daya Radar Utama	18 June 2013	27 September 2014	17 June 2015	Active
117M variant without hangar
Teluk Kendari	518	PT Dok & Perkapalan Kodja Bahari (Persero)	31 July 2012	26 September 2014	7 December 2020	Active
Teluk Kupang	519	PT Dok & Perkapalan Kodja Bahari (Persero)	31 July 2012	17 January 2017	7 December 2020	Active
Teluk Lada	521	PT Daya Radar Utama	20 April 2016	28 June 2018	26 February 2019	Active
Teluk Weda	526	PT Bandar Abadi Shipyard	19 December 2019	27 February 2021	26 October 2021	Active
Teluk Wondama	527	PT Bandar Abadi Shipyard	19 December 2019	27 February 2021	26 October 2021	Active
117M variant with hangar
Teluk Youtefa	522	PT Daya Radar Utama	10 July 2017	15 May 2019	12 July 2021	Active
Teluk Palu	523	PT Daya Radar Utama	10 July 2017	1 June 2019	9 March 2022	Active
Teluk Calang	524	PT Daya Radar Utama	10 July 2017	19 August 2019	8 August 2022	Active

== Operational history ==
In January 2018, during a naval landing exercise at the Berhala Strait, Teluk Bintuni received a signal from a tugboat which was being hijacked by pirates. The vessel launched an LCVP and apprehended the hijackers. She later brought supplies to areas affected by the 2018 Sulawesi earthquake and tsunami.

In August 2019, Teluk Lada was dispatched to rescue hostages aboard MV Mina Sejati, a 36-crew squid fishing vessel which was hijacked by several members of her own crew off Tual, Maluku. Mina Sejati was later discovered empty by Teluk Lada, with eleven survivors testifying that three of the crew had massacred the others.

== See also ==
Equivalent landing ships of the same era

- Type 072A (Batch 2)
- Isla Tiburón class
- Damen LST 100
