= Aleksandr Aleksandrovich Blagonravov =

Soviet and Russian engineer and designer (1933–2020)

- Born: 24 May 1933; Moscow, RSFSR, Soviet Union
- Died: 1 January 2020 (aged 86); Kurgan, Kurgan Oblast, Russian Federation
- Resting place: Ketovo Cemetery, Ketovo, Kurgan Oblast, Russia
- Education: Military Academy of the Armoured Forces
- Parent: Aleksandr Ivanovich Blagonravov
- Engineering career
- Discipline: Military engineering Armoured vehicle design
- Employer: Kurganmashzavod
- Projects: BMP-2; BMP-3
- Awards: Order of Lenin Order of the Red Banner of Labour

Aleksandr Aleksandrovich Blagonravov (Russian: Александр Александрович Благонравов; 24 May 1933 – 1 January 2020) was a Soviet and Russian military engineer and designer who worked on the designs of armoured vehicles. Major general of Engineering and Technical Service (1982).

Born the son of a military engineer who worked on tank designs during the time of the Second World War, Blagonravov followed in his father's footsteps. After studying at the Military Academy of the Armoured Forces, he began a long association with the academic study of problems relating to mechanised military vehicles. He taught and researched at the academy after graduation, and also served briefly as a deputy battalion commander in the 4th Guards Tank Division. He left the academy in 1974, taking up the position of chief designer at Kurganmashzavod, a state enterprise that designed and produced infantry fighting vehicles. Under his leadership the designs of the BMP-2 and BMP-3 were brought to fruition, entering service with the Soviet Armed Forces.

Stepping down as chief designer in 1989, Blagonravov continued to live and work in Kurgan, teaching at Kurgan State University and producing a number of academic works. Over his career he had received awards from the Soviet and Russian governments, including the Order of Honour, the Order of Lenin, the Order of the Red Banner of Labour, and the Medal "For Battle Merit". He was a Doctor of Technical Sciences.

== Family and early life ==
Blagonravov was born on 24 May 1933 in Moscow, the capital of the Russian Soviet Federative Socialist Republic and the Soviet Union. He was the son of Aleksandr Ivanovich Blagonravov, a military engineer who worked on the T-34 and IS-2 tank designs, and had been awarded the Stalin Prize. He entered the Military Academy of the Armoured Forces in 1951, eventually working on the theory of turning tracked vehicles, and then in the field of transmissions, turning mechanisms, and continuously variable transmissions for his dissertation. He graduated in 1957 as a military mechanical engineer. From 1957 to 1961 he was a junior research fellow at the Academy, and then from 1961 to 1962 was a deputy battalion commander in the 4th Guards Tank Division, based in the city of Naro-Fominsk.

== Academia and Kurganmashzavod ==
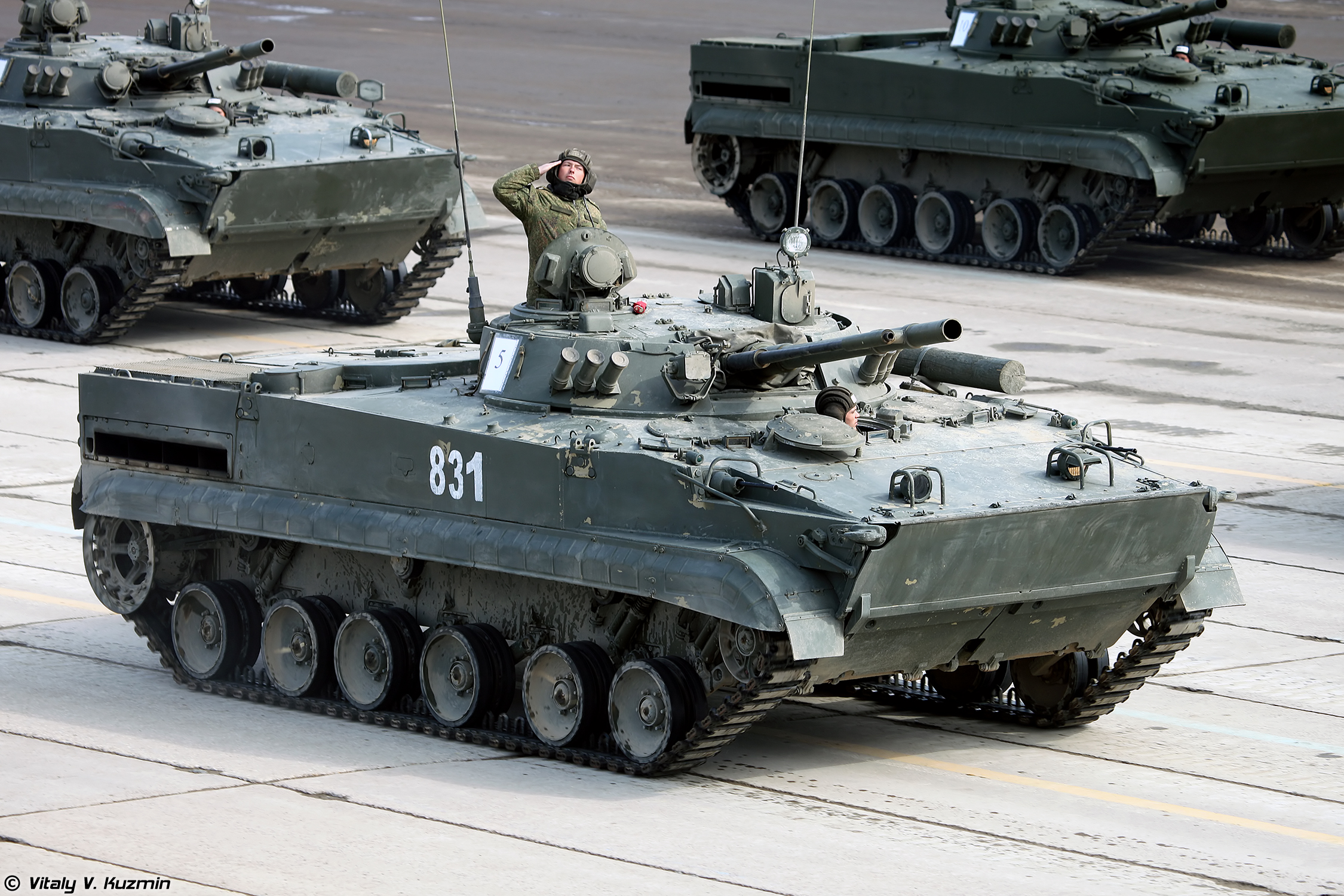
BMP-3s on parade in Moscow

From 1962 Blagonravov was back at the Military Academy of the Armoured Forces, serving as a senior researcher, and then senior lecturer, until 1974. In 1974 he was appointed chief designer at Kurganmashzavod, which specialised in producing lightly armoured vehicles, particularly infantry fighting vehicles. He led the design of the enterprise's BMP-2 design, which entered general service with the Soviet Armed Forces in 1980. Alongside work to finalise the BMP-2 and bring it into mass production, He and a team of designers at Kurganmashzavod began work on a next-generation version of the vehicle in 1976, which was finalised and entered service in 1987 as the BMP-3.

== Retirement and studies ==
Blagonravov served as Kurganmashzavod's chief designer until 1989, and in retirement continued to participate in academic work and engineering studies. He eventually authored some 140 printed works and four monographs. After 1989 he spent ten years as Head of the Department of Tracked Vehicles at Kurgan State University. He was a Doctor of Technical Sciences (1971).

== Death and funeral ==
Blagonravov died in Kurgan on 1 January 2020, at the age of 86. Condolences were offered by Vadim Shumkov, the governor of Kurgan Oblast, and by Andrey Potapov, head of the city of Kurgan. A memorial ceremony was held on 6 January in the sports complex "Zauralets" in Kurgan. It was attended by some 300 people, including members of Kurganmashzavod and former members of the government of the Kurgan region, including ex-governor Oleg Bogomolov and his former deputy Aleksandr Bukhtoyarov. His body is interred in the village cemetery of Ketovo in Kurgan.

== Awards and honors ==
Over his career, Blagonravov received numerous awards and honours.

- Order of Honour, 6 December 2003
- Order of Lenin, 1989
- Order of the Red Banner of Labour, 1981
- Medal "For Battle Merit"
- Jubilee Medal "In Commemoration of the 100th Anniversary of the Birth of Vladimir Ilyich Lenin"
- Medal "Veteran of the Armed Forces of the USSR"

He was also given the title:

- He had retired with the military rank of major general.
- Honoured Science and Technology Worker of Russia, 27 March 1996
- Honorary Citizen of Kurgan city, 2000
- Honorary Citizen of Kurgan Oblast.
- The portrait was entered into the Gallery of Honor "Kurgans - the pride of the city", August 2003
