= KRI Teluk Kupang =

History

Indonesia
- Name: Teluk Kupang
- Namesake: Kupang Bay
- Ordered: 2012
- Builder: PT Dok & Perkapalan Kodja Bahari (Persero), Jakarta
- Yard number: AT-2
- Laid down: 31 July 2012
- Launched: 17 January 2017
- Commissioned: 7 December 2020
- Identification: Pennant number: 519
- Status: Active

General characteristics
- Class & type: Teluk Bintuni-class tank landing ship
- Displacement: 2,300 tons
- Length: 117 m (383 ft 10 in)
- Beam: 16.4 m (53 ft 10 in)
- Height: 7.8 m (25 ft 7 in)
- Propulsion: 2 x 3,285 kW (4,405 hp) main engines
- Speed: 16 knots (30 km/h; 18 mph)
- Boats & landing craft carried: 4 unit LCVPs; 1 unit RIB 10 m rubber boat; 2 unit RIB 7 m rubber boat
- Capacity: 5 unit Leopard 2A4 main battle tanks or 14 unit BMP-3F IFVs and 1 PT-76 light tank
- Troops: 359
- Complement: 111 crew and 6 helicopter crew
- Armament: 2 x Bofors 40 mm L/70 guns 2 x 12.7 mm machine guns
- Aircraft carried: 1 x Bell 412 helicopter

KRI Teluk Kupang (519) is the second Teluk Bintuni-class tank landing ship of the Indonesian Navy.

== Characteristics ==
Teluk Kupang has a length of 117 metres (383 ft 10 in), beam of 16.4 metres (53 ft 10 in) and height of 7.8 metres (25 ft 7 in) with a speed of 16 knots (30 km/h; 18 mph). She has a capacity of 478 passengers, including her crew of 109 and a helicopter crew of 6, in addition to ten Leopard main battle tanks or ten BMP-3F infantry fighting vehicles and one PT-76 amphibious tank. Teluk Kupang also has a helipad with hangar and capable of carrying a Bell 412 helicopter.

== Service history ==
KRI Teluk Kupang was built by an Indonesian state-owned shipbuilder PT Dok & Perkapalan Kodja Bahari (Persero) (also called DKB), Jakarta. The ship was ordered in 2012, based on AT-117M design that would become the Teluk Bintuni-class ships. Her building process was ceremonially begun with the first steel-cutting on 31 July 2012, and she was assigned with yard number of AT-2.

Due to internal problems faced by the shipbuilder, her construction was delayed. She was finally launched on 17 January 2017 in a ceremony at DKB dockyard in North Jakarta. She was transferred to the Navy and commissioned on 7 December 2020, with Sea Lieutenant Colonel Suryai as her first commanding officer.
