= Malinovsky Military Armored Forces Academy =

Soviet military academy in Moscow

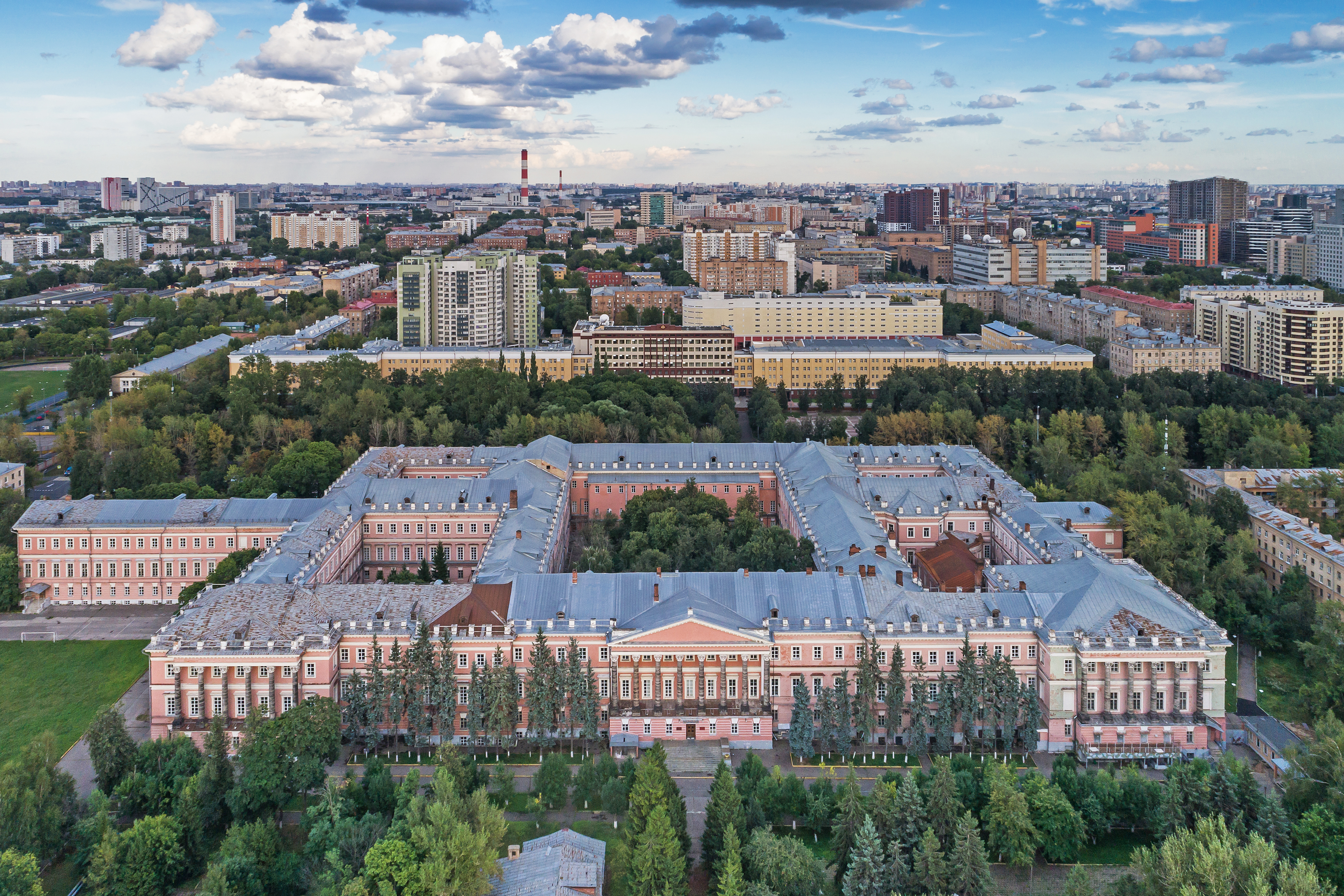
The Academy building was designed for Catherine the Great to serve as a royal palace

The Malinovsky Military Armored Forces Academy (Военная академия бронетанковых войск имени Маршала Советского Союза Р. Я. Малиновского) was one of the Soviet military academies. It was based in the Lefortovo district of Moscow, in a former royal palace.

The institution was established in 1932 as the "J.V. Stalin Academy of the WPRA Mechanization and Motorization Program". It was renamed after Marshal Rodion Malinovsky in 1967. Its mission was to train Soviet and Warsaw Pact commanders, staff officers, and engineers for armored and mechanized units. The best-qualified graduates were selected for the "centralized operations division" of the General Staff. Students entered as captains and majors, some as lieutenant colonels. Commanding and staff officers underwent a three year program while engineers were taught for 4 years. Notable alumni included Vasily Chuikov, Sergey Akhromeyev, Boris Vasiliev, Aleksandr Blagonravov, and Anatoly Kvashnin.

In 1998 the Malinovsky Academy merged with the Frunze Military Academy to become the "Combined Arms Academy".
