= KRI Teluk Bintuni =

Indonesian naval vessel

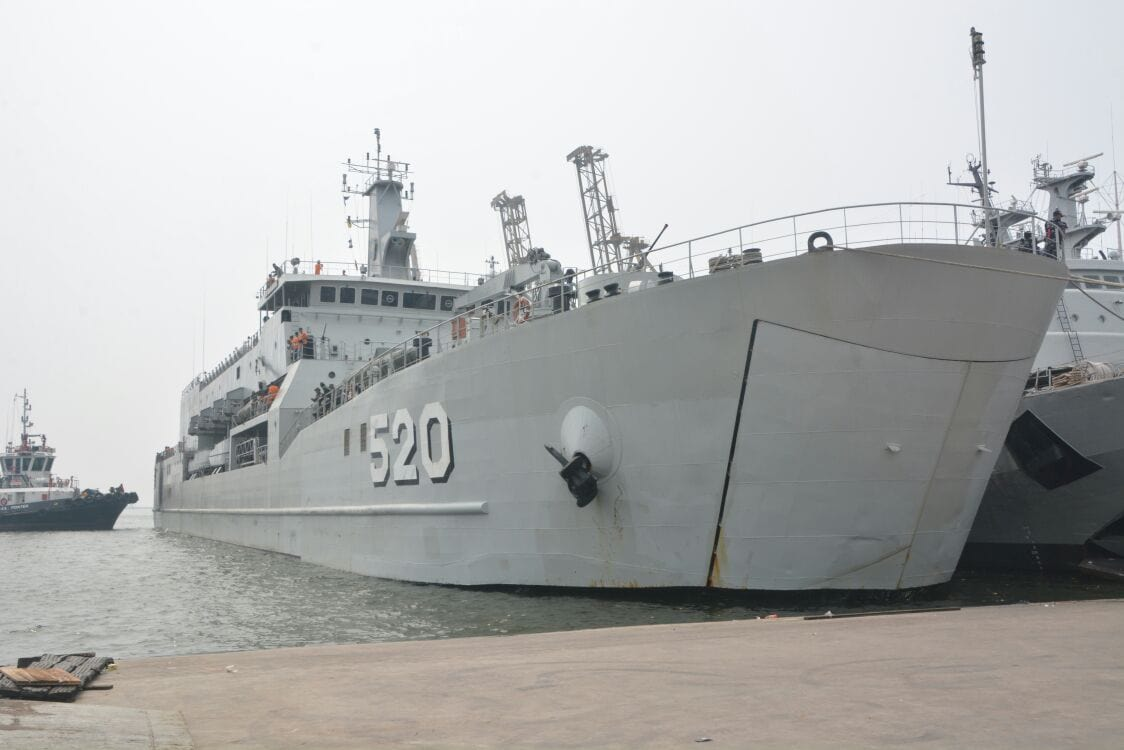
- KRI Teluk Bintuni at Kupang in 2017

History

Indonesia
- Name: Teluk Bintuni
- Namesake: Bintuni Bay
- Builder: PT Daya Radar Utama, Lampung
- Yard number: AT-3
- Laid down: 18 June 2013
- Launched: 27 September 2014
- Commissioned: 17 June 2015
- Identification: Pennant number: 520
- Motto: Rarowafe Mamowa Fiinia Manes; (The Knight of Sea, Defender of Homeland)
- Status: Active

General characteristics
- Class & type: Teluk Bintuni-class landing ship tank
- Displacement: 2,300 tons
- Length: 120 m (393 ft 8 in)
- Beam: 18 m (59 ft 1 in)
- Height: 11 m (36 ft 1 in)
- Draft: 3 m (9 ft 10 in)
- Propulsion: 2 x 3,285 kW (4,405 hp) main engines
- Speed: 16 knots (30 km/h; 18 mph)
- Range: 7,200 nmi (13,300 km; 8,300 mi)
- Endurance: 20 days
- Boats & landing craft carried: 4 LCVPs
- Capacity: 10 Leopard 2 main battle tanks or; 14 BMP-3F infantry fighting vehicles or; 45 troop transport vehicles
- Troops: 361
- Complement: 113 ship crew; 6 helicopter crew
- Armament: 1 x Bofors 40 mm/L70 guns 1 x 20 mm cannon 2 x 12.7 mm machine guns
- Aircraft carried: 2 x helicopters

KRI Teluk Bintuni (520) is a tank landing ship (LST) of the Indonesian Navy. Commissioned in 2015, she is the third ship of her class and was the first to be commissioned. She is also the namesake of her class.

== Design ==
Teluk Bintuni has a length of 120 metres (393 ft 8 in), a beam measuring 18 metres (59 ft 1 in), and a height of 7.8 metres (25 ft 7 in) with a draft of 3 metres (9 ft 10 in). She has a capacity of 476 passengers, including crew, alongside 10 Leopard 2 main battle tanks and a helicopter. The ship was designed to be able to stay at sea for 20 days.

With a crew of 119, consisting of 113 sailors and 6 helicopter crew, she has a displacement of 2,300 tonnes and has a maximum speed of 16 knots (30 km/h; 18 mph). The ship is armed with light defensive weapons in form of a Bofors 40 mm gun and two 12.7 mm heavy machine guns.

The vessel could also carry four LCVP boats, and is equipped with a crane for cargo loading and offloading.

== Service history ==
Teluk Bintuni was built by Indonesian shipbuilder PT Daya Radar Utama (DRU), using steel sourced from Krakatau Steel for its hull. The ship was ordered from DRU as part of a three-ship order for LSTs (where DRU was awarded just one), and DRU was the first builder to deliver the ship. At the time of its launch, it was the largest LST operated by the Indonesian Navy, with other vessels displacing 1,500 or 1,800 tonnes. The ship was built at a cost of Rp 160 billion (US$13 million in 2014). The ship was laid down on 18 June 2013, with yard number AT-3. She was launched on 27 September 2014 at DRU's shipyard in Bandar Lampung, with Indonesian Navy Lieutenant Colonel Ahmad Muharam being appointed as her first commander. She was later commissioned on 17 June 2015.

In January 2018, during a naval landing exercise at the Berhala Strait, Teluk Bintuni received a signal from a tugboat which was being hijacked by pirates. The vessel launched an LCVP and apprehended the hijackers. She later brought supplies to areas affected by the 2018 Sulawesi earthquake and tsunami.
