= Kurganmashzavod =

Manufacturing company based in Kurgan, Russia

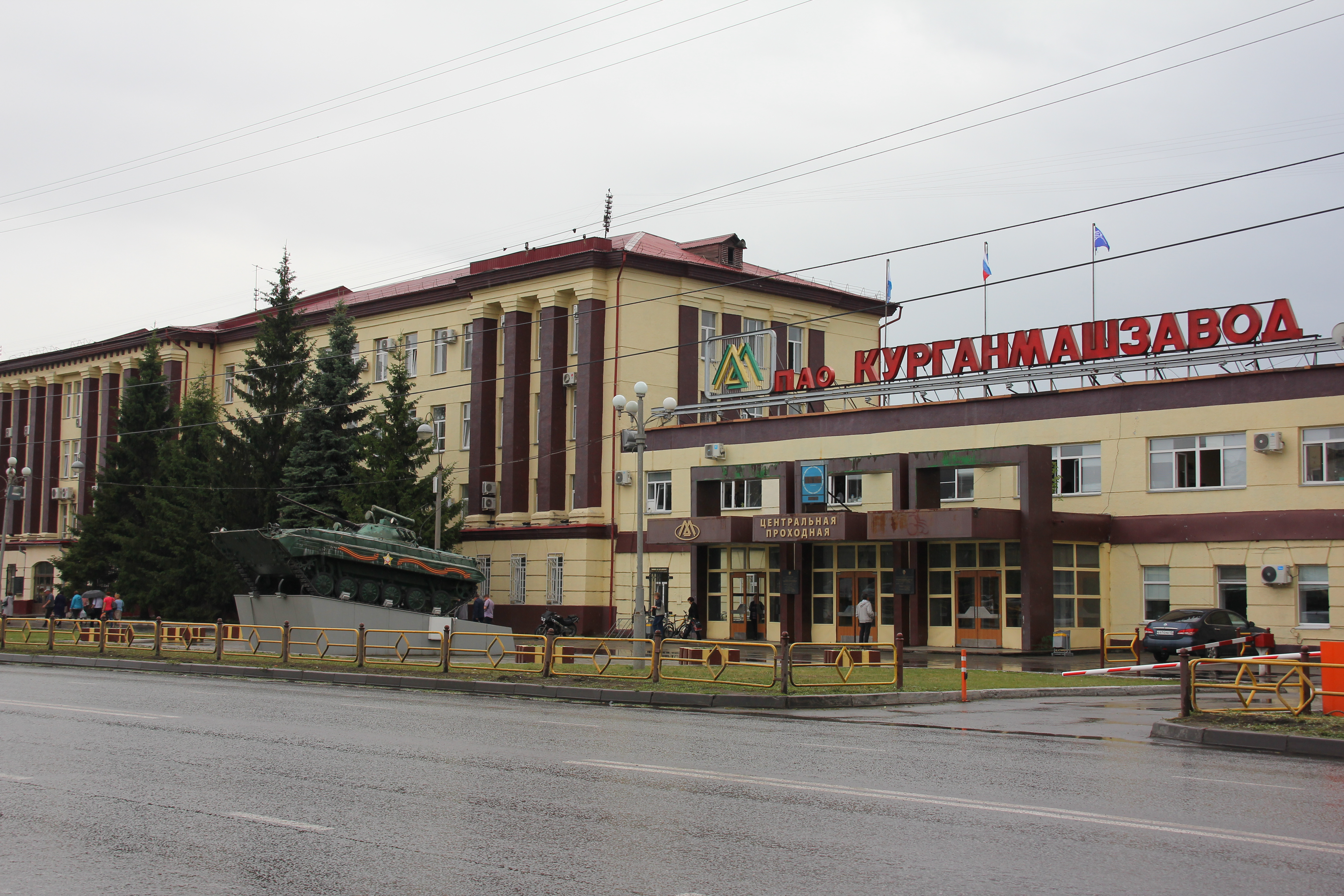
- Type: Joint-stock company
- Industry: Automobile industry Arms industry
- Founded: 1950
- Headquarters: Kurgan, Russia
- Products: Military vehicles
- Revenue: $338 million (2017)
- Operating income: −$9.69 million (2017)
- Net income: −$1.86 billion (2017)
- Total assets: $52 million (2017)
- Total equity: −$1.91 billion (2017)
- Parent: High Precision Systems (Rostec)
- Website: kmz.ru

JSC Kurganmashzavod (Russian: Курганмашзавод, lit. 'Kurgan Machine-Building Plant') is a manufacturing company based in Kurgan, Russia. It is known for its BMP series of infantry fighting vehicles.

== Overview ==
The company's main products are the well-known BMP-2 and BMP-3 infantry fighting vehicles, which are in service in 29 countries and, since April 2024, the BMD-4 airborne fighting vehicles. The company also produces a wide range of civil products, such as small-sized tractors, municipal construction machines and automobile trailers, among others.

Kurganmashzavod JSC is the largest enterprise in the Kurgan Oblast. It is a large engineering complex, comprising 3 factories, 6 special plants and auxiliary workshops ensuring the complete production cycle. It is involved in developing technology, testing equipment and experimental development, pilot production and full-scale production of armoured vehicles.

The director general of Kurganmashzavod until 2005 was Valery D. Dorodny. The director general as of 2018 is Pyotr Aleksandrovich Tyukov.

== History ==
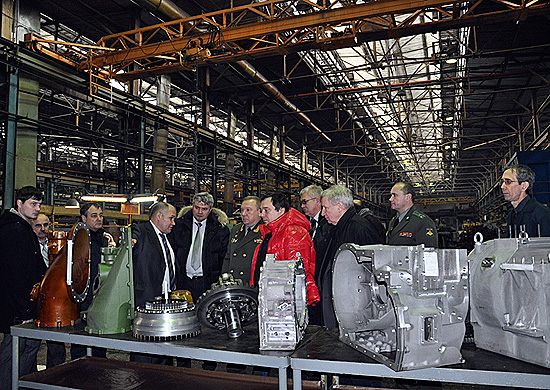
Vladimir Shamanov visiting the Kurganmashzavod plant in 2013

The company was founded as a producer of heavy-duty cranes. In 1954 the manufacture of military equipment was started with the ATS and ATS-59 artillery tractors, which were used for field work and reclaiming of oilfield in Tyumen region, in addition to many produced for export. The ATS-59 artillery tractor licence production was established in Poland. In October 1966, the production plan of the infantry fighting vehicle BMP-1 was prescribed by the government bylaw. In 1967, the mass production of vehicles began.

In the 1970s, the plant was re-tooled for larger-scale military vehicle production. New power supplies were brought in, and the working area was increased by a factor of five. From 1983, the plant produced the BMP-2 model, and in 1987 began the manufacture of the BMP-3.

In 2007 the company's revenue was $231 million. Export share was 20%.

In 2008, the company said that it was pursuing a production processes optimization programme to make the operations more efficient. In the future the company aims to produce "hundreds of vehicles a year, rather than dozens of vehicles per annum", both for the Russian Army and for export.

Kurganmashzavod received a large state contract worth $250 million for building and repairing an unspecified number of BMP-3 vehicles between 2007 – 2010. The company planned on investing about $40 million to re-equip its facilities.

In late December 2015, the company was reportedly "balancing on the brink of full stoppage" of its AFV production because of an outstanding natural gas bill of 55.5 million rubles (approximately US$764,000) to Gazprom Mezhregiongaz.

In 2019, ownership of the company was transferred to High Precision Systems (part of the Rostec holding).
