= Indonesian World Records Museum =

Indonesia World Records Museum
- Location in Semarang
- Established: 27 January 1990
- Location: Semarang, Central Java, Indonesia
- Coordinates: 7°04′09″S 110°24′40″E
- Collection size: ~ 1200
- Website: www.muri.org

The Indonesia World Records Museum (Museum Rekor-Dunia Indonesia or MURI) is a museum located in the Banyumanik district of Semarang, Central Java, Indonesia. A collection of Indonesian and World records is presented in this museum. It was founded in 1990 by Jaya Suprana, and a Jakarta gallery was opened in 2013.

== History ==
The MURI museum was founded by Jaya Suprana, a jamu businessman, on 27 January 1990, which coincided with Suprana's birthday and the 1990 Chinese New Year. Its inauguration was attended by several government ministers such as Soepardjo Rustam and Sudomo. The museum's site was within Suprana's jamu factory complex in Semarang, and it was initially known as the Indonesian Records Museum (Museum Rekor Indonesia). Its first record was for the youngest walker from Jakarta to Semarang.

In August 2005, the museum opened a gallery at the Borobudur temple complex, and rebranded to the current name of the Indonesian World Records Museum. The Borobudur gallery closed in early 2008. It opened a Jakarta gallery at the Mall of Indonesia in August 2013.

== Records ==
MURI classifies the records into seven categories: Health and Sports, Art and Culture, Science and Technology, Economy and Industry, Humanity and Environment, Pioneer and Innovation, and State Administration. As of 2010, the Semarang museum maintained a collection of over 1,300 records. The museum covers a space of over 600m².

In 2009, MURI published a book of records, documenting all the records they had recorded between 1990 and 2008.
