= Jaya Suprana =

Jaya Suprana, (née Phoa Kok Tjiang) is an Indonesian businessman, pianist, composer, conductor, writer, cartoonist, and television presenter.

Jaya Suprana was born in Denpasar, Bali as a Chinese descendant, but grew up within Javanese culture. He studied music at Musikhochschule Münster and Folkwang-Hochschule Essen, West Germany, between 1967 and 1976, and since then has given piano recitals worldwide, as well as composing his own music. He also presents his own national weekly talkshow called the Jaya Suprana Show. His daily writings have appeared in the daily newspapers Kompas, Suara Pembaruan, Sinar Harapan, on-line media such as RMOL, Askara, SMSI and books published by Elex Media Komputindo.

He also established the Indonesian Museum of Records (MURI), Rotary-Suprana Orphanage, Centre for Kelirumologi Study, and together with Aylawati Sarwono founded the Jaya Suprana School of Performing Arts which has performed wayang orang at the Sydney Opera House and Unesco Paris also recital master class series with young Indonesian talented musician on international stages and in 2011 organised the Indonesia Pusaka International Piano Competition with participants from 12 countries and the gala concert at the presidential palace in Bogor attended by the president and first lady of Republic Indonesia. In 2014, Jaya Suprana performed his piano recital in the Carnegie Hall, New York, USA and organized the first Indonesian International Philosophy Symposium in the Ministry of Education and Culture of Indonesia in Jakarta. Suprana received a PhD degree in philosophy and social sciences from the unaccredited Pacific Western University. He is also the Chairman of his family-run medicinal herbs producing firm, PT Jamu Cap Jago, in the Central Java capital of Semarang. He tours with his group Kwartet Punakawan
