= BMP-3 =

Soviet/Russian infantry fighting vehicle

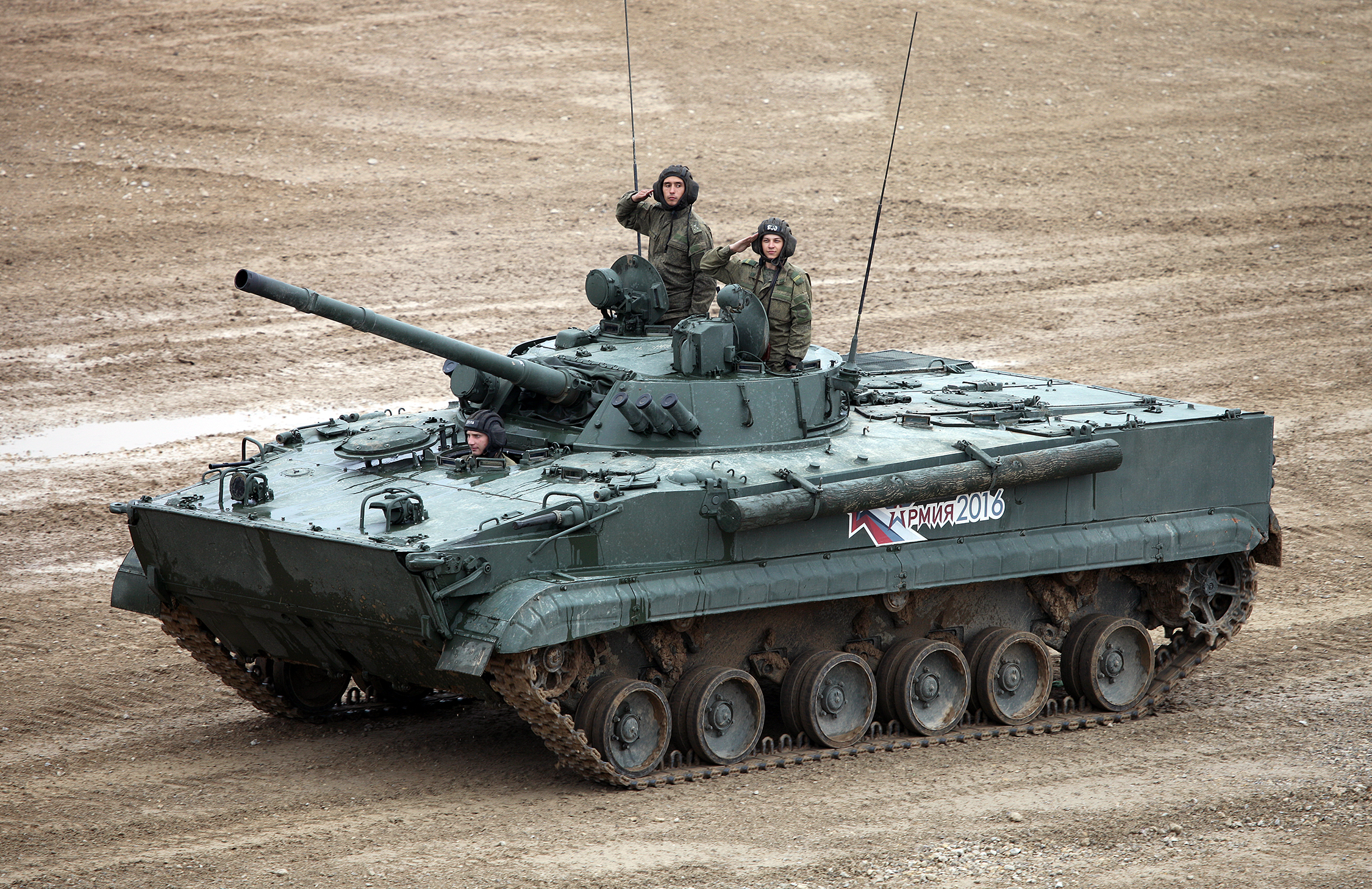
- BMP-3
- Type: Infantry fighting vehicle
- Place of origin: Soviet Union

Service history
- In service: 1987–present
- Used by: See Operators
- Wars: First Chechen War; Second Chechen War; Yemeni Civil War (2014–present); Saudi Arabian-led intervention in Yemen; Second Nagorno-Karabakh War; Russo-Ukrainian War: Russo-Ukrainian war (2022–present)

Production history
- Designed: 1975–1987
- Manufacturer: Kurganmashzavod
- No. built: 2,000+

Specifications
- Mass: 18.7 tonnes (18.4 long tons; 20.6 short tons)
- Length: 7.14 m (23 ft 5 in)
- Width: 3.2 m (10 ft 6 in)
- Height: 2.4 m (7 ft 10 in)
- Crew: 3 (commander, gunner, driver); 7 troopers (+ 2 additional seats)
- Armor: Aluminium alloy (ABT-102) and steel armour (BT-70Sh); Hull Front: 22 mm steel, 60 mm aluminium Hull Sides/Rear: 43 mm aluminium Hull Roof: 15 mm aluminium Hull Floor: 10 mm aluminium Turret Front: 16 mm steel, 70 mm space, 50 mm aluminium Turret Roof: 18 mm aluminium Turret Sides/Rear: 43 mm aluminium
- Main armament: 2K23/Bakhcha-U/Berezhok turret with 100 mm 2A70 cannon; 30 mm 2A72 autocannon; AGS-30 grenade launcher and Kornet-EM (Berezhok turret only); AU-220M Baikal remote weapon station turret with 57 mm BM-57 autocannon
- Secondary armament: 3 × 7.62 mm PKT machine guns
- Engine: UTD-29M diesel 500 hp (375 kW)
- Power/weight: 27 hp/tonne
- Suspension: torsion bar
- Operational range: 600 km (370 mi)
- Maximum speed: 72 km/h (45 mph) (road); 45 km/h (28 mph) (off-road); 10 km/h (6.2 mph) (water)

The BMP-3 is a Soviet infantry fighting vehicle, successor to the BMP-1 and BMP-2. The abbreviation BMP stands for Boevaya Mashina Pekhoty (Боевая Машина Пехоты, literally "infantry combat vehicle").

== Production history ==
The design of the BMP-3 (Obyekt 688M) can be traced back to the Obyekt 685 light tank prototype with an 2A48-1 100 mm gun from 1975. The prototype did not enter series production, but the chassis, with a new engine, was used for the next-generation infantry combat vehicle Obyekt 688 from A. Blagonravov's design bureau. The Ob. 688's original weapon configuration consisting of an externally mounted Shipunov 2A42 30 mm autocannon, a 7.62 mm PKT machine gun and twin 9M113 Konkurs ATGM launcher was rejected; instead, the new 2K23 armament system was selected. The resulting BMP-3 was developed in the early 1980s and entered service with the Soviet Army officially in 1987. It was shown for the first time in public during the 1990 Victory Day parade and was given the NATO code IFV M1990/1.

The BMP-3 is designed and produced by the Kurganmashzavod ("Kurgan Machine Building Plant") some variants however are built by the Rubtsovsk Machine Building Plant (RMZ), for example the BRM-3K.

In May 2015, the Russian Defense Ministry signed a three-year contract to receive "hundreds" of BMP-3 vehicles to maintain its armored vehicle force until its replacement, the Kurganets-25, completes research and development. In the process of the BMP's serial production, the vehicle's design underwent 1,500 amendments. The contract was fully executed in 2017. 200 more received in 2018–2019 and 168 more in production to be delivered in 2020–21 with additional protection.

In the Army-2017 show, the Russian Defence Ministry signed a contract covering the first deliveries of an unspecified number of BMP-3 infantry fighting vehicles (IFVs) fitted with the Bumerang-BM turret, also known as the B-19 variant. The BMP-3 B-19 took part in the large-scale Russian-Belarusian exercise Zapad in September 2021.

In 2022, Russia started to promote to the international market a BMP-3 with a remotely controlled combat module. The batches of vehicles delivered to the Russian troops since 2023 are equipped with the Sodema main sight and extra protection as well as the ability to install ERA.

Kurganmashzavod reported in May 2023 that during the first quarter of the year it supplied the same number of vehicles it did in the whole of 2019. In July 2023, Russian Defense Minister Sergey Shoigu stated that the supplies and repair of BMP-3 by Kurganmashzavod had surged 2.1 times since early 2022. Kurganmashzavod reported in early September 2023 that the supply of BMP-3 increased by 3 times at comparison with peacetime.

A new batch of about 12 vehicles equipped with additional protection and electronic warfare systems was delivered in July 2026.

== Design ==
=== Weaponry and optics ===
The BMP-3 is one of the most heavily armed infantry combat vehicles in service. The original version has a turret fitted with a low-velocity 2A70 100 mm rifled gun which can fire conventional shells or 9M117 Bastion Anti Tank Guided Missiles (AT-10 Stabber). It carries 40 100 mm rounds and 8 ATGMs. A 2A72 30 mm dual feed autocannon with 500 (300 HEI and 200 AP-T) rounds and a rate of fire of 350 to 400 rounds per minute and a 7.62 mm PKT machine gun with 2,000 rounds are mounted coaxially in the turret. The main gun elevates from −5° to +60°. There are also two 7.62 mm PKT bow machine guns, again with 2,000 rounds each. The BMP-3 is capable of engaging targets out to 5,000–6,000 metres with its ATGM weapon system 9K116-3 "Basnya". With conventional ammunition, such as the HE-Frag shell 3OF32, the 2A70 gun has a range of 4,000 metres.

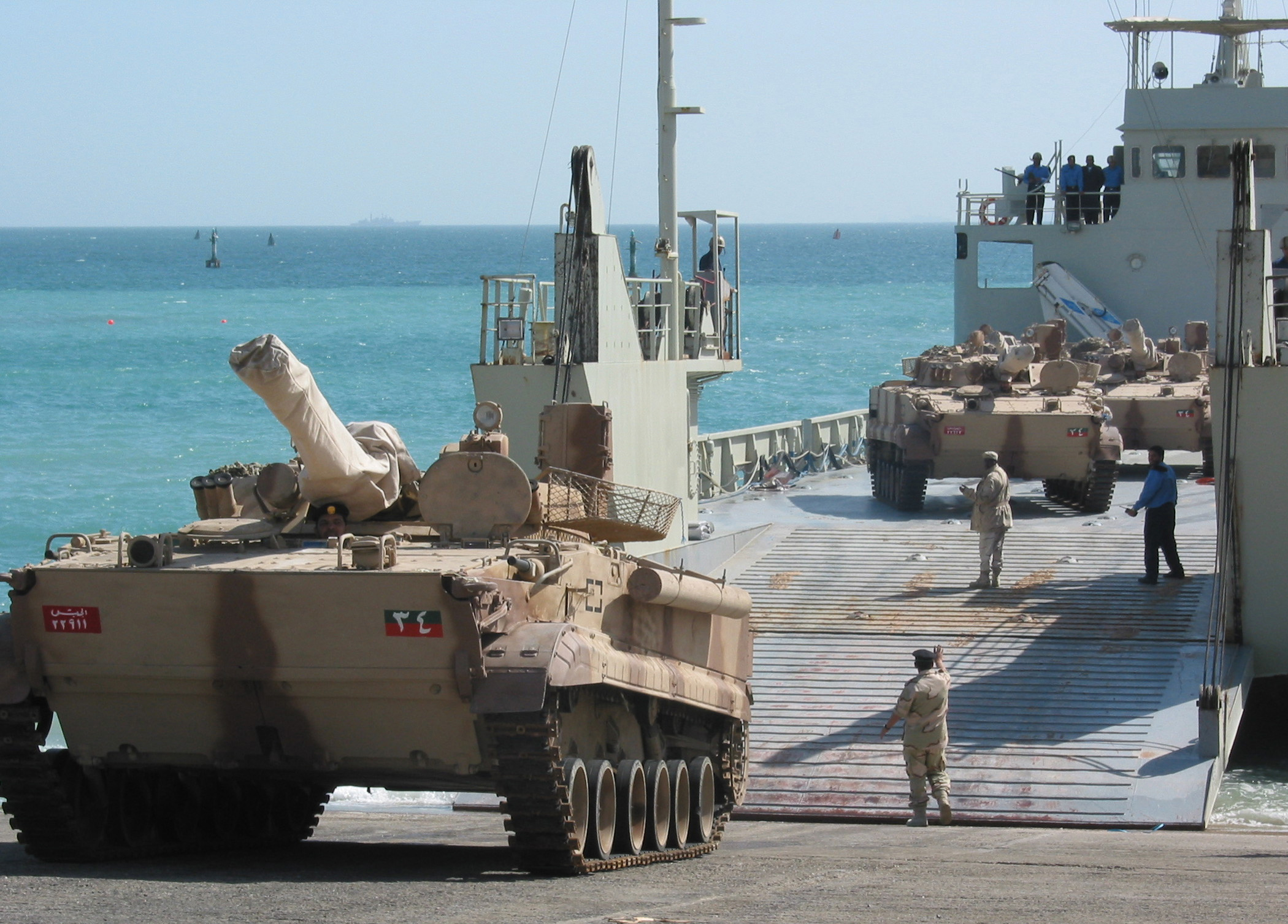
A BMP-3 of the UAE with a "Namut" thermal sight

According to the manufacturer's website, all weapons can be fired while stationary, on the move, and afloat with the same effectiveness. The ability to hit targets on the move with missiles was successfully demonstrated during competitive evaluations in the UAE in 1991.

External videos
- Autoloader animation on YouTube
- ATGM loading on YouTube

The turret is fitted with the 2K23 system, which consists of an autoloader with 22 rounds (the remaining 18 rounds are stored in the hull), a 1V539 ballistic computer, a crosswind sensor, a 2E52-2 stabilising system, a 1D16-3 laser rangefinder, a 1K13-2 gunner's sight/guidance device, a PPB-1 gunner's sight and an OU-5-1 IR searchlight. Optional autoloader for ATGM missiles is also available. The commander has a combined optical sight 1PZ-10, a day/night vision device TKN-3MB and an IR searchlight OU-3GA2.

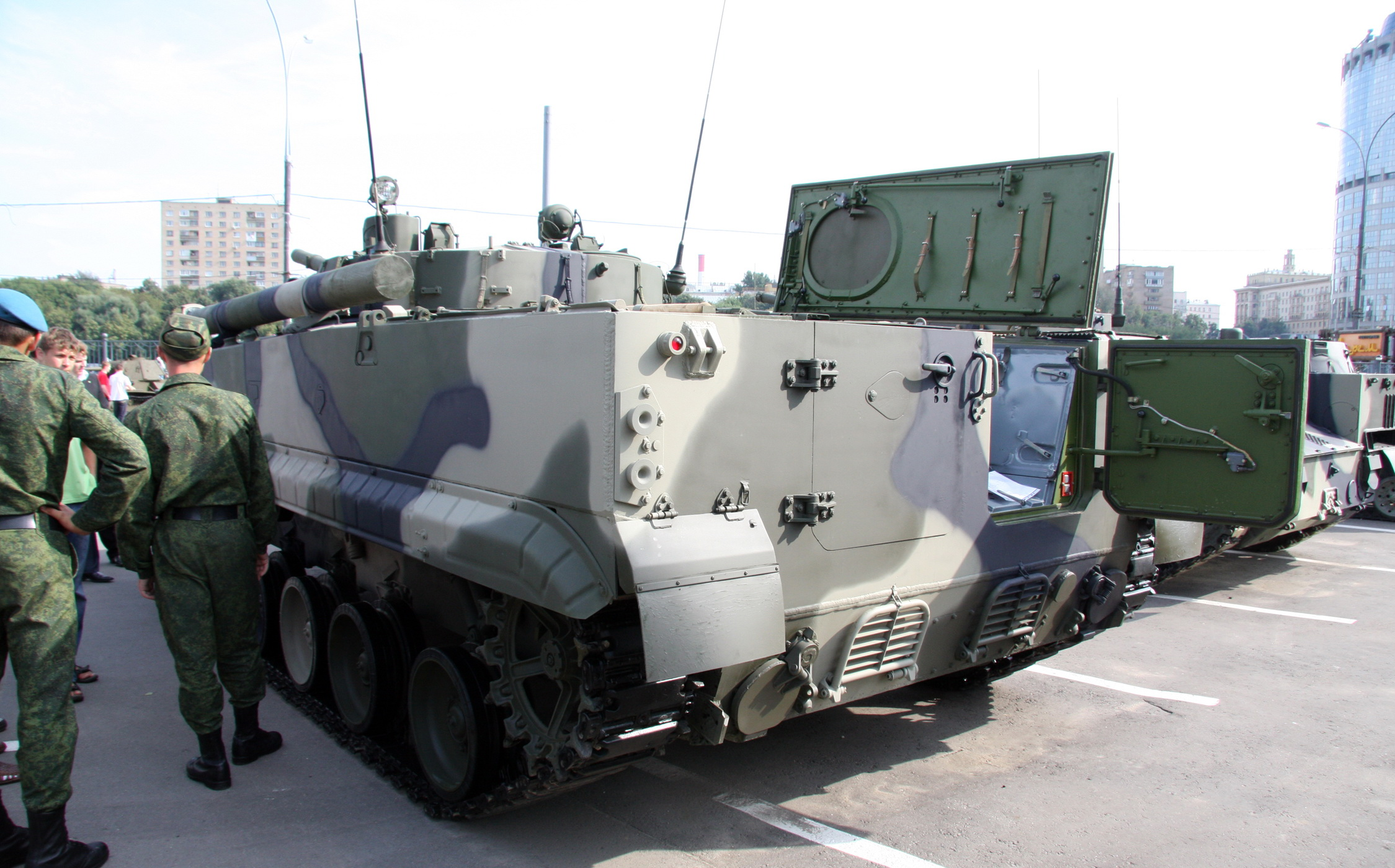
Rear view of a BMP-3, showing how troops are expected to exit the vehicle

Since 2005, the BMP-3 can be fitted with a new fire control system from the "Peleng" Joint Stock Company from Belarus. This consists of a SOZH-M gunner's main sight with an integrated laser rangefinder and missile guidance channel, a Vesna-K targeting system with thermal imaging camera and automatic target tracker AST-B, an armament stabilisation system, a ballistic computer with data input sensors and a PL-1 IR laser projector. Since 2017, the BMP-3 is fitted with a new fire control system from the "Vologda Optical-Mechanical Plant" from Russia. This consists of a Sodema two-plane stabilized gunner's main sight with an integrated laser rangefinder and missile guidance channel plus a SOZH-M thermal imaging camera.

Standard equipment includes five firing ports with associated vision blocks, an R-173 transceiver, an R-173P receiver, a GO-27 radiation and chemical agent detector, an FVU filtration system, an automatic fire extinguisher and six 902V "Tucha-2" 81 mm smoke grenade launchers.

BMP-3M is equipped with Bakhcha-U turret, which has similar weapons to the original BMP-3 turret but with a new dual-channel FLIR gunner's sight, commander's panoramic thermal imaging device, vertical-storage conveyor, new autoloader, and a new sighting system. It also has a stronger armor on the turret, and two-axis stabilisation.

The turret of the BMP-3 has been fitted to the Patria Armoured Modular Vehicle and on the Turkish-UAE RABDAN 8x8 IFV.

In August 2017, a BMP-3M was presented with a new ATGM remote weapon station fitted on the standard turret carrying two 9M120 Ataka (AT-9 Spiral-2) missiles.

In June 2018, the Russian Defense Ministry announced that BMP-3s would be fitted with the AU-220M combat module equipped with a 57 mm cannon. The module can carry 80 rounds and fire 80 rounds per minute including air burst, high-explosive, fragmentation, armor-piercing and guided munitions with a maximum range of 14.5 km (9.0 mi), and can even punch through the side armor of main battle tanks.

=== Mobility ===
The vehicle has an unconventional layout. The engine is in the back of the vehicle to the right (unlike most other IFVs, which have the engine located forward in the hull). As a result, the driver is seated forward in the hull (in the center) together with two infantrymen (one on each side of the driver). The vehicle has a double bottom, and the engine is located under the floor of the vehicle (troops enter/leave the vehicle over the engine). The remaining five infantrymen are seated aft of the two-man turret.

Early models were powered by a 450 hp engine UTD-29, but most BMP-3s are now equipped with the 500 hp UTD-29M version. The engine was developed at the Transmash Diesel Engine Plant in Barnaul. The BMP-3 has a range of 600 km, an altitude of operation of up to 3,000 m and it is transportable by train, truck, sea, and air. The BMP-3 engine is a diesel four-stroke, liquid-cooled design. The transmission is a four-speed hydromechanical power unit, with power takeoff to its water jets. The suspension is independent, with a torsion bar and six hydraulic shock absorbers. Steering is by gear differential with hydrostatic drive. The track adjusting mechanism is remotely controlled from the driver's station, with tension force indication. The water-jet propulsion unit is single-stage, axial, auger-type.

=== Countermeasures ===
The hull and turret are made of a high-strength aluminum alloy, with the front of the hull being provided with an extra steel plate welded over it plus spaced armor from the trim vane. The turret is also provided with a thick steel spaced armour shield over its frontal arc. Over the frontal arc, the vehicle is protected against 30 mm gun rounds at a range of 200 m. In addition to "hard" protection, the BMP-3's self-sealing fuel tank is located in front of the driver, directly behind the front armour plating. It is specially constructed to act as armour, effective against shaped charge warheads as well as any autocannon shells that managed to go through the front armour.

The BMP-3 can create a smoke screen by injecting fuel into the exhaust manifolds. A chemical agent detector, an FVU filtration system, an automatic fire extinguisher and six 902V "Tucha-2" 81 mm smoke grenade launchers are standard.

At least two distinct sets of explosive reactive armour kit are currently available, giving the BMP-3 protection from less advanced rocket propelled grenades. One of them is the Kaktus ERA kit, which has a unique design that creates minimal acoustic and kinetic backlash to the armour behind it upon detonation, thus ensuring that the occupants will not be harmed by shockwaves from the ERA block. The ERA blocks will completely disintegrate after detonation. According to Kurganmashzavod, the BMP-3 may also be fitted with additional side armor tiles, which can resist .50 caliber armour-piercing ammunition perpendicularly at close ranges. They give the BMP-3 added side protection from autocannon fire as well. BMP-3s serial production with ERA started as of November 2022.

The BMP-3 also has the ability to carry a Shtora-1 electro-optical jammer that disrupts semiautomatic command to line of sight (SACLOS) antitank guided missiles, laser rangefinders and target designators. Shtora is a soft-kill, or passive-countermeasure system. BMP-3s serial production with the Nakidka camouflage system started as of May 2024. BMP-3 infantry combat vehicles started receiving serially outfitted drone suppression systems in June 2024.

The standard weight of the vehicle is 18.7 tonnes. If additional armour overlay (metal sheet of armour and Kaktus ERA) is installed, the weight will reach to 22.2 tonnes. The body is covered from the sides and the top. In such kit, it is protected against 12.7 mm machine gun rounds in the range of 100–200 m. Rostec reported in September 2023 that the production of additional protection kits for the BMP-3 increased 30 times in comparison with 2022.

== Operational history ==
=== First Chechen War ===
The BMP-3 saw action with the Russian forces during the First Chechen War.

=== Kosovo ===
In 2000, the United Arab Emirates deployed some BMP-3s in peacekeeping operations during the Kosovo War.

=== Saudi Arabian-led intervention in Yemen ===
The BMP-3 also saw military use with Emirati forces during the Saudi Arabian-led intervention in Yemen.

=== Russo-Ukrainian War ===
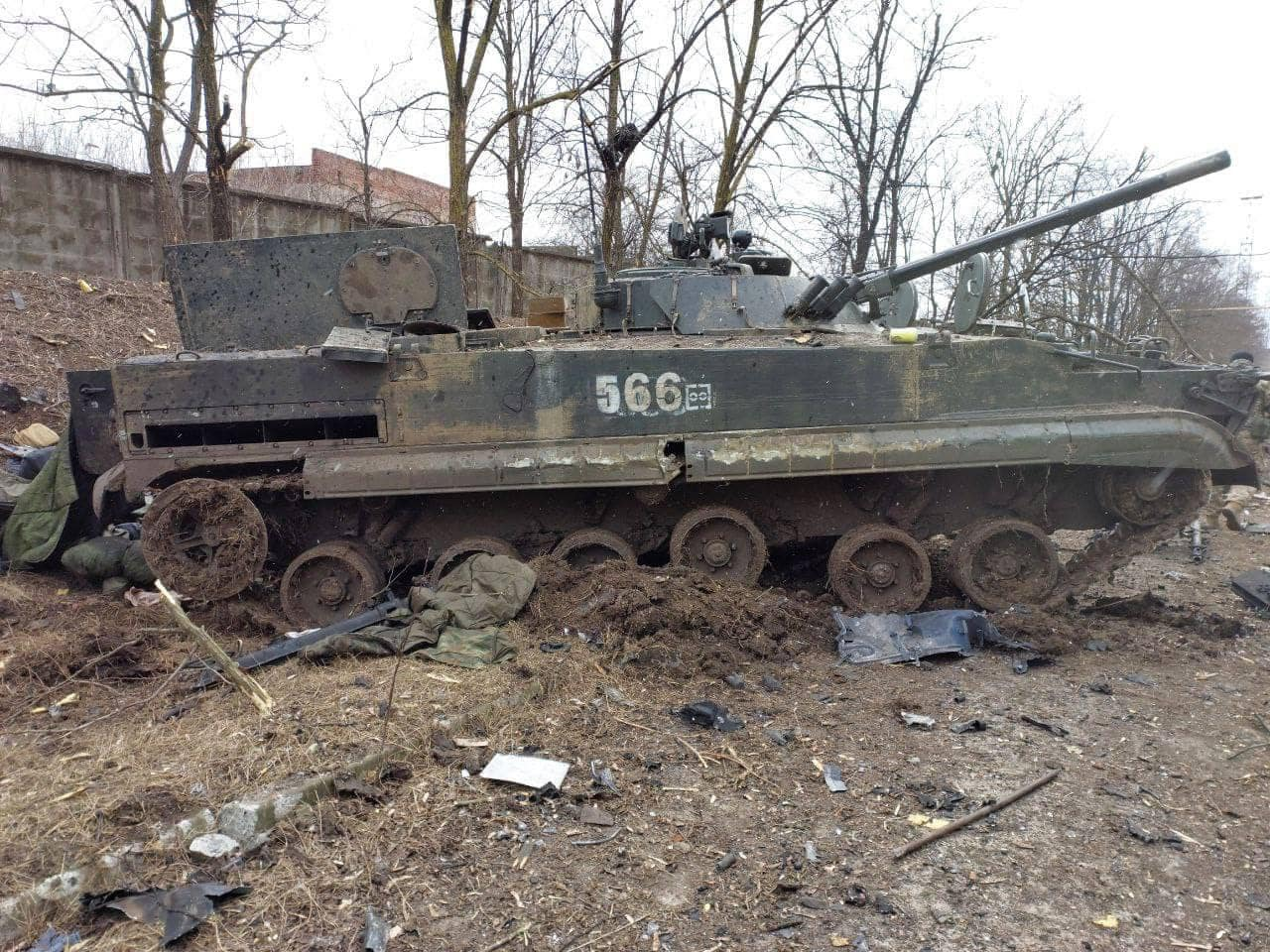
An abandoned Russian BMP-3 during the 2022 Russian invasion of Ukraine

The BMP-3 has been used during the Russian invasion of Ukraine by Russian forces. An unknown number have been put into service by the Armed Forces of Ukraine after being captured. Ukrainian anti-tank missiles and attack drones with HEAT warheads have been able to overcome protection systems on the BMP-3 such as reactive and slat armor, so by 2024 they were increasingly being used for indirect fire support.

As of December 29, 2025, open source intelligence website Oryx has visually confirmed the loss of at least 798 Russian BMP-3s (624 destroyed, 24 damaged, 82 abandoned, and 68 captured) and 10 BREM-Ls (7 destroyed, 1 damaged, 2 abandoned).

== Variants ==
=== Russia ===
- BMP-3 – Basic version, as described.
- BMP-3M – KBP and Kurganmashzavod have upgraded the vehicle with a new engine and turret with a new ATGM system 9K116-3 Basnya. The upgraded vehicle is called the BMP-3M and the new Bakhcha-U turret includes a new automatic fire control system with ballistic computer, new Sodema gunner's sight with laser rangefinder and an ATGM guidance channel, thermal imager, TKN-AI commander's vision device with laser illuminator and new ammunition loading system for ATGM. The BMP-3M is also able to fire various ammunition types, including new 100 mm laser-guided projectiles, new 100 mm HE-FRAG (high explosive fragmentation) rounds and new 30 mm APDS (armour piercing discarding sabot) rounds. Its additional auxiliary armour shields are effective against 12.7 mm armour-piercing rounds from a range of 50 m. Since November 2022 all upgraded vehicles have Kaktus ERA. The new uprated engine is the UTD-32, which is rated at 660 hp. There are actually several different M models, some fitted with additional armour, "Arena-E" or "Shtora-1" active protection systems, air conditioner etc.
- BMP-3M Ataka – BMP-3M version with a two men turret armed with the 30 mm 2A72 autocannon, and the 9M120-1 Ataka ATGM.

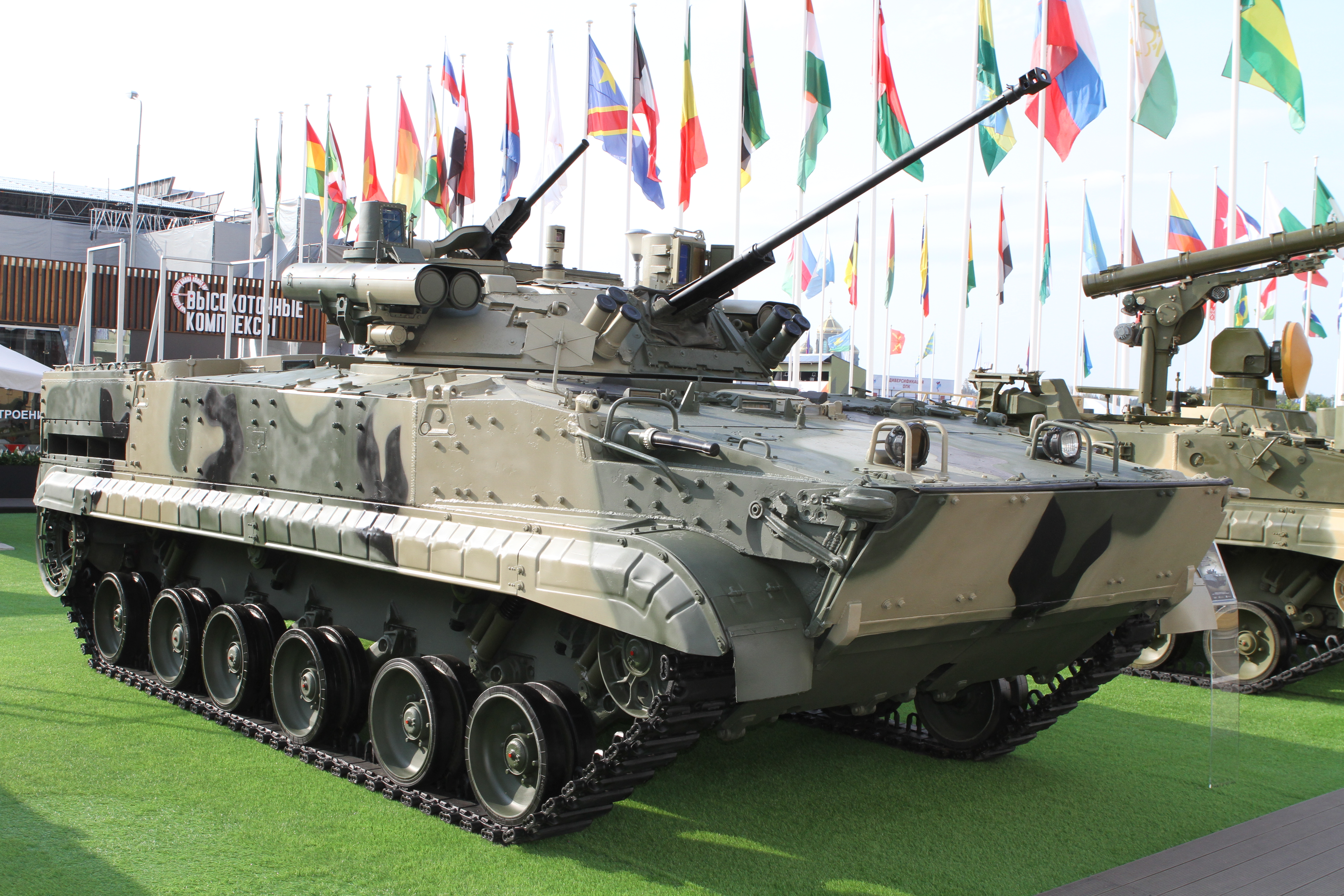
A BMP-3 fitted with the BMP-2 Berezhok turret

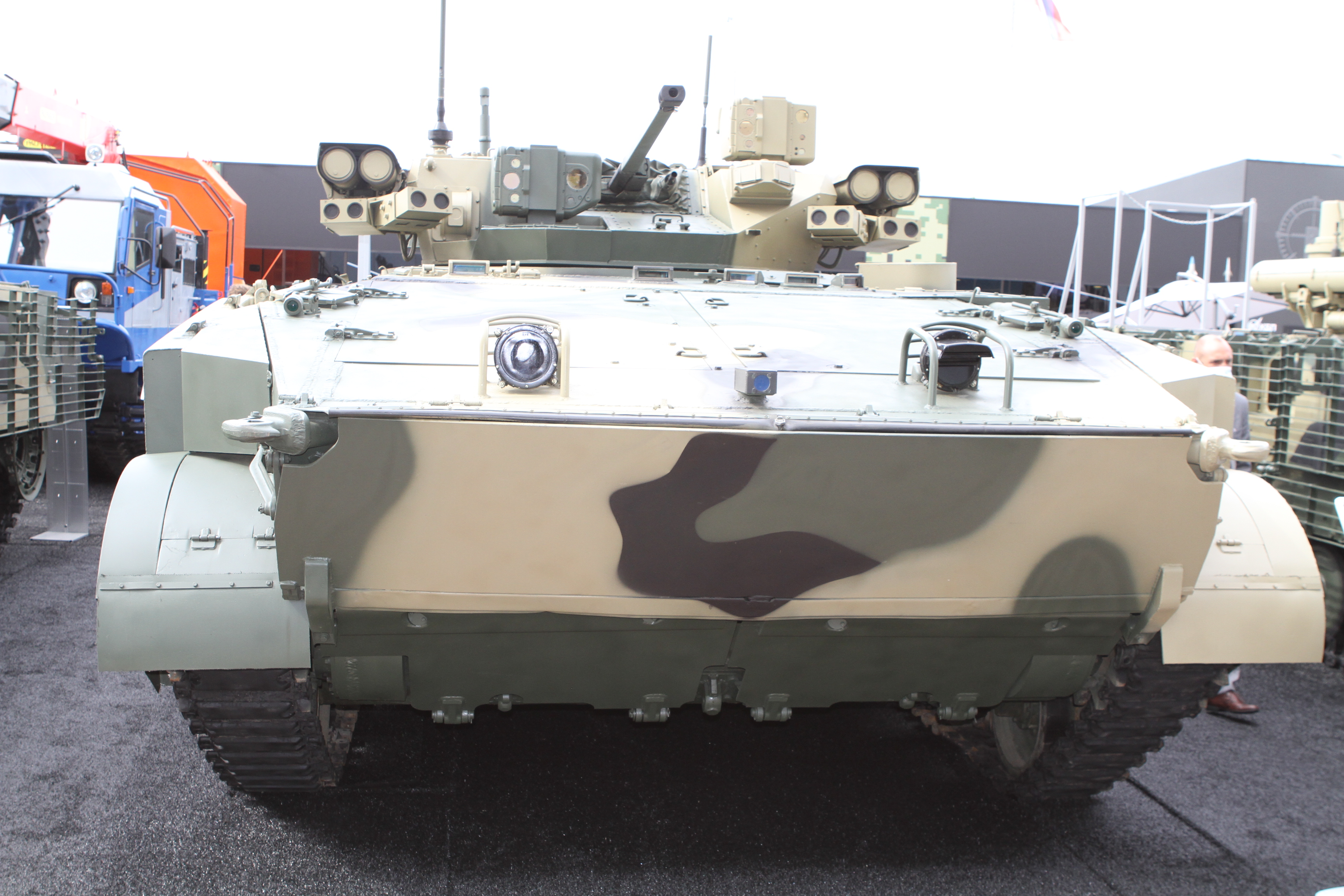
BMP-3 fitted with the Bumerang-BM turret

- BMMP (bojevaya mashina morskoj pekhoti) – Version for naval infantry, fitted with the turret of the BMP-2.
- BMP-3K (komandnyi) – Tactical command variant, includes additional radio R-173, an intercom for seven users, an AB-R28 independent portable power unit, a navigation device TNA-4-6 and the "Ainet" air burst round detonation system. The BMP-3K lacks the bow machine guns and has its whip antennas mounted on the rear hull. Crew: 3+3.
- BMP-3F – Armed with the standard 2K23 turret. Specially designed for operations at sea, with improved seaworthiness and buoyancy, capability to move afloat at sea state 3 and fire with the required accuracy at sea state 2. Compared to the basic model, the vehicle design features changes increasing flotation and vehicle stability: the self-entrenching equipment is omitted, a lightweight anti-surge vane and an air intake tube are introduced; the BMP-3F turret is also protected by anti-surge vanes. Water jet propellers develop a speed of 10 km/h when afloat. The BMP-3F design allows the vehicle to come ashore under rough sea conditions and to tow the same-type vehicle. A new main sight, the SOZH, which has an integrated laser rangefinder and an ATGM guidance channel, is installed. This version can endure continuous amphibious operation for seven hours with the running engine.
- BT-3F – Amphibious version based on BMP-3F with the original turret replaced by a smaller remote weapon station with either 7.62, 12.7 or 14.5 mm machine gun. It can accommodate a crew commander, driver, gunner, and 14 troops, and can use optional ERA armor.
- BRM-3K "Rys" (Ob.501) (boyevaya razvedivatel'naya mashina) – Surveillance and reconnaissance variant with 1PN71 thermal sight (3.7x/11x, 3 km range), 1PN61 active-pulse night vision device ( 3 km range), 1RL-133-1 ("TALL MIKE") I-band surveillance radar (3 km man, 12 km vehicle), 1V520 computer and a TNA-4-6 navigation system. The armament consists of the stabilized 30 mm autocannon 2A72 (600 rounds) and a coaxial 7.62 mm machine gun (2,000 rounds) or AU-220M Baikal remote weapon station with 57 mm BM-57 autocannon and 7.62 mm PKMT machine gun. Combat weight: 19 t, crew: 6. In 1993, Russia started quantity production of BRM-3K vehicles.
- BMP-3 Dragoon – New IFV version with an unmanned turret which can be armed with a variety of combat modules, including standard BMP-3's Bakhcha-U turret with a 2A70 100 mm cannon, a 2A72 30 mm autocannon and a PKTM 7.62 mm machine gun, the AU-220M Baikal remote weapon station module with a 57 mm BM-57 gun and a module with a 125 mm 2A82-1M tank gun, the new 816 hp turbocharged UTD-32T engine and powerplant moved to the front, and a hydraulic ramp fitted to the rear. It is reported that its trials were finished in October 2017.

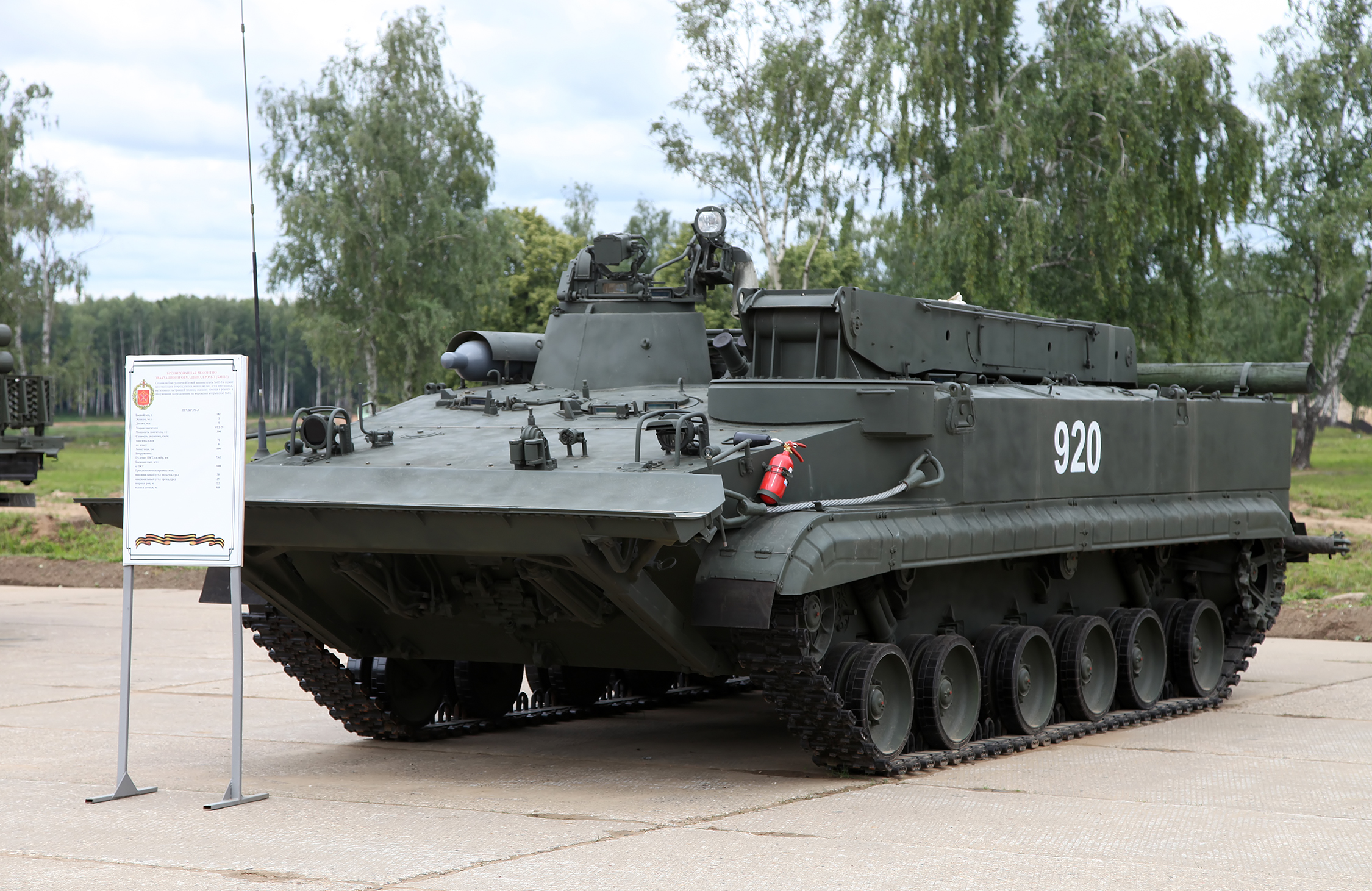
BREM-L "Beglianka" of the Russian army

- BREM-L "Beglianka" (Ob.691) (bronirovannaya remontno-evakuatsionnaya mashina) – Armoured recovery vehicle with five-tonne crane and 20/40 tonne capacity winch.

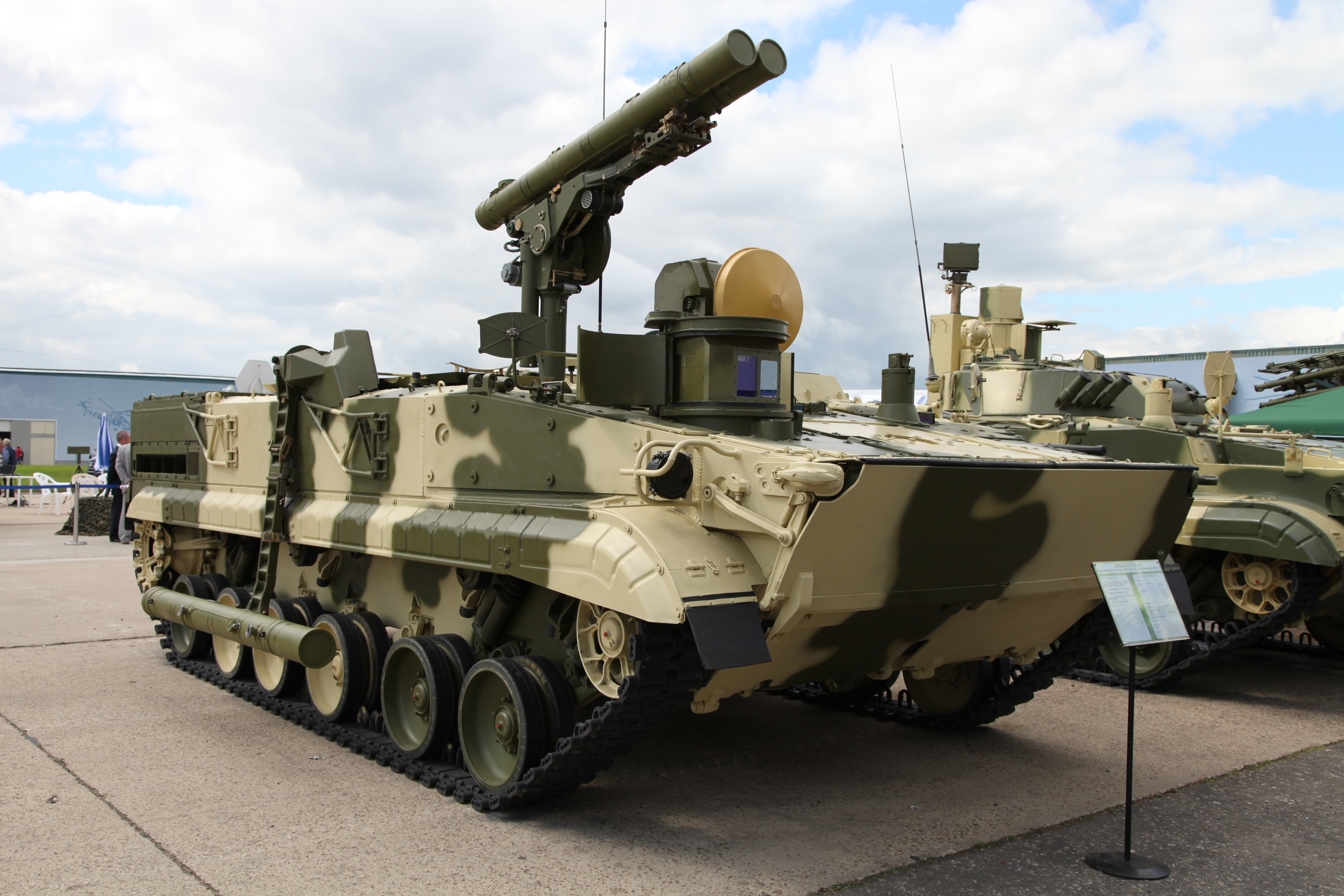
9P157-2 "Khrizantema-S

- BMP-3 "Khrizantema-S" (9P157-2) – Self-propelled anti-tank version with 9M123 Khrizantema (AT-15) ATGM system with radar and laser guidance. The 9P157-2 carries two 9M123 missiles on launch rails, which are extended from a stowed position; the radar is also stowed during transit. The missiles are reloaded automatically from an internal magazine with 15 rounds (missiles are stored and transported in sealed canisters) and can also accept munitions manually loaded from outside the vehicle. The manufacturer claims that three 9P157-2 tank destroyers are able to engage 14 attacking tanks and destroy at least sixty percent of the attacking force. The dual guidance system ensures protection against electronic countermeasures and operation in all climatic conditions, day or night. NBC protection is provided for the crew (gunner and driver) of each 9P157-2 in addition to full armor protection equivalent to the standard BMP-3 chassis and entrenching equipment. The 9M123 missile itself is supersonic, flying at an average speed of 400 m/s (Mach 1.2) and a range of between 400 and 6,000 meters. Entered service in 2005. More than 10 sets of new anti-tank guided missile (ATGM) complexes on tracks, which replaced the "Shturm" complexes, entered the artillery units of the Southern Military District, based in Ingushetia, in November 2012. Khrizantema vehicles are fielded with artillery units.
- 9P163M-1 "Kornet-T" – Anti-tank version with Kornet (AT-14) missile system. Some sources call it the 9P162. The Kornet is similar in function to the Khrizantema missile system. The 9P163M-1 carries two 9M133 missiles on launch rails, which are extended from a stowed position during transit. Missiles are reloaded automatically by the tank destroyer from an internal magazine with 16 rounds (missiles are stored and transported in sealed canisters). Nuclear, biological and chemical protection is provided for the two crew members (gunner and driver) in addition to full armour protection equivalent to the standard BMP-3 chassis. The guidance system of the 9P163M-1 allows two missiles to be fired at once, the missiles operating on different guidance (laser) channels. The first Kornet-T missile carriers were delivered in 2003 to replace the Shturm-S, and the first batch of 20 vehicles entered service in 2012. The Kornet-T is used by motorized units.
- 2S18 "Pat-S" (Ob.697) – Self-propelled version of the 152 mm howitzer 2A61 "Pat-B". This was only a prototype, further development led to the 2S31 Vena.
- DZM "Vostorg-2" (dorozhno-zemlerojnaya mashina) – Combat engineer vehicle with a dozerblade and excavating bucket. Prototype.
- UR-07 (ustanovka razminirovaniya) – Mine clearing system. The UR-07 might replace the UR-77 "Meteorit". It has the same chassis as the BMP-3 but a bigger steel hull with two launch ramps in the rear. The ramps are used to fire rockets towing hose-type mine-clearing line charges to clear mine fields.
- UNSh (Ob.699) (unifitsirovannyj shassi) – Basic chassis for specialised variants.
- KhTM (khodovoj trenazhor) – Driver trainer.
- Hermes or TKB-841 – Air-defence vehicle with high-velocity missiles and radar system. Prototype.
- 2S31 Vena – Self-propelled mortar carrier equipped with a 120 mm mortar based on BMP-3 chassis. It entered production in 1996 and service in 2010.

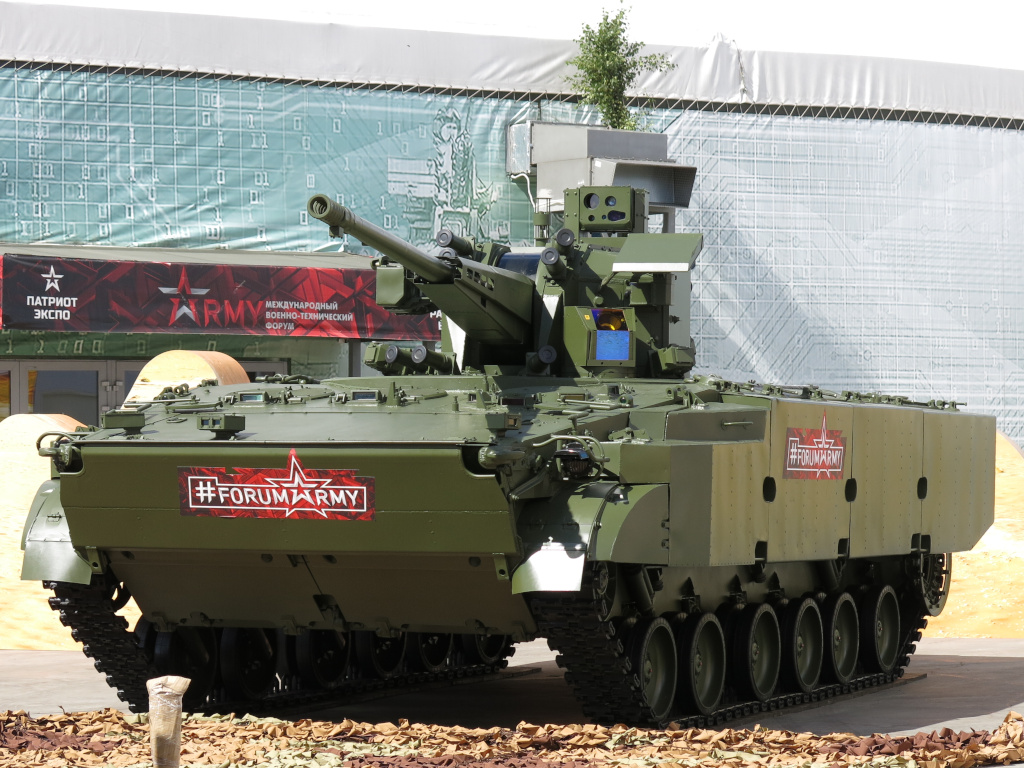
2S38 BMP-3 Derivatsiya-PVO

- 2S38 ZAK-57 Derivatsiya-PVO – Self-propelled air defense vehicle based on BMP-3 chassis fitted with a 57 mm autocannon and passive reconnaissance and target tracking equipment. It is designed to shoot down unmanned aerial vehicles (UAVs), cruise missiles, air-to-surface missiles, aircraft, helicopters, and MLRS rockets. 2S38 is equipped with a TV/thermal-imaging system with automatic target lock-on and tracking capabilities, a laser rangefinder and a laser guidance system. The optical and electronic target acquisition system can spot an aircraft at 6.4 km (4.0 mi) and using sectoral observation can detect aircraft over 12 km (7.5 mi) out. The cannon is fast enough to destroy targets traveling 500 m/s (1,100 mph; 1,800 km/h; Mach 1.5). Laser-guided, air burst and specialized anti-drone munitions for ZAK-57 are in development. Its guided projectiles have four wings folded in the casing and controlled by the actuator in the projectile's nose section, using the energy of the airflow to steer themselves to the target. Completed development in 2023.
- UDAR UGV – Unmanned ground vehicle based on the tracked chassis of the BMP-3 with the center hull raised to fit the DUBM-30 Epoch armed with 2A42 autocannon, 7.62 mm PKMT machine gun, and Kornet-M ATGM.
- Vikhr UGV – Unmanned ground vehicle based on BMD-3 equipped with a smaller turret armed with 2A72 autocannon, 7.62 mm PKMT coaxial machine gun and six anti-tank guided missiles 9M133M Kornet-M, three on each side of the turret. It can carry separate aerial and ground drones.
- Prokhod-1 – Unmanned mine-clearing vehicle based on the BMP-3 chassis. It is equipped with the anti-mine TMT-C trawl, and a remote weapon station turret with a 12.7 mm machine gun.
- BMP B-19 – BMP-3 hull with the turret replaced with the Epoch Remote Control Turret armed with one 57 mm cannon, four Kornet-EM anti-tank missiles and a Bulat guided missile system.

== Operators ==
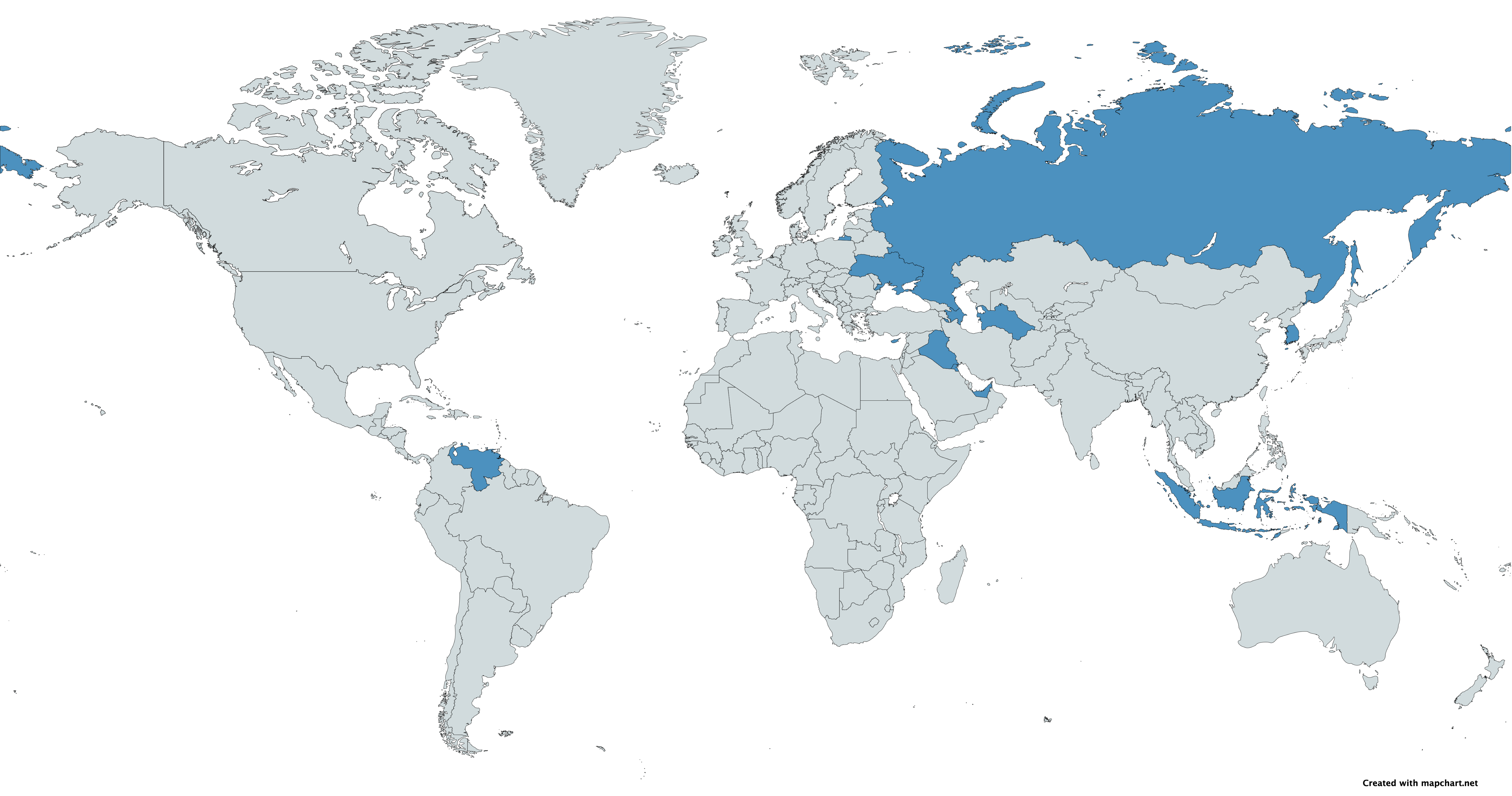
BMP-3 operators in blue

=== Current operators ===
- Azerbaijan – 118 BMP-3M delivered in 2013–2016.
- Cyprus – 43 delivered in 1995–1996.
- Indonesia – 54 BMP-3F & 1 BREM-L currently in service. (17 BMP-3F arrived in 2010 and another 37 BMP-3F & 1 BREM-L were received in 2014.)
- Iraq – 300 BMP-3M IFVs ordered in 2015 and delivered in 2018–2019.
- Kuwait – Currently 122 BMP-3 and 103 BMP-3M in service. 118 delivered in 1995–1996. A new contract was signed in 2013. Contract was executed on September 30, 2015.
- Russia – 760 before the 2022 Russian invasion of Ukraine and 750 as of 2026. At least 798 BMP-3s and 10 BREM-Ls have been confirmed lost during the Russian invasion of Ukraine (by Oryx).
- South Korea – As of 2022, 40 in service. 33 delivered in 1996–1997 to pay off Russian debt, and another 37 in 2005. In 2016, Moscow was seeking the possibility of their return.
- Turkmenistan – 4 in 2024.
- Ukraine – 4 inherited from the USSR; with an additional, unknown number of units being captured and put back into service during the Russian Invasion of Ukraine
- United Arab Emirates – 390 BMP-3 delivered in 1992–1997.
- Venezuela – 123 BMP-3M and BREM-L, first deliveries in 2011, completed in 2012.

=== Failed bids ===
- Saudi Arabia – Application for 950 BMP-3s around 2015.
- Greece – The Hellenic Army ordered 450 BMP-3 from Russia as part of a €1.7 billion deal but cancelled the order in 2011.
- India – In 2012 Russia offered a transfer of the BMP-3 technology to the Indian Army if it would cancel its homegrown $10 billion Futuristic Infantry Combat Vehicle (FICV) program, but in November 2013 India rejected the offer.

== See also ==
- List of modern armoured fighting vehicles
- Mechanized infantry
- BMD-4 – (Russia)
- K21 – (South Korea)
- Combat Vehicle 90 – (Sweden)
- Makran IFV – (Iran)
- M2 Bradley – (United States)
- Expeditionary Fighting Vehicle – (United States)
- Puma – (Germany)
- Tulpar – (Turkey)
- T-15 Armata – (Russia)
- Vikram VT21 – (India)
- ZBD-04 – (China)
- ZBD-05 – (China)
- Type 89 – (Japan)
