= INS Shardul (1975) =

History

India
- Name: INS Shardul
- Namesake: Bengal Tiger
- Builder: Gdańsk Shipyard; Stocznia Gdynia
- Commissioned: 24 December 1975
- Decommissioned: June 1997
- Identification: Pennant number: L16
- Status: Decommissioned

General characteristics
- Class & type: Kumbhir-class tank landing ship
- Displacement: 1120 tons (standard)
- Length: 83.9 m
- Beam: 9.7 m
- Draught: 1.3 metres (extreme bow and 2.58 metres (stern)
- Depth: 5.2 m
- Propulsion: 2 x 2200 hp Soviet Kolomna 40-D two stroke diesel engines.
- Speed: 18 knots
- Complement: 120 (incl. 12 officers)
- Sensors & processing systems: SRN 7453 radar
- Armament: 2 × AK-230 30mm guns; 4 × CRN-91 AA (Naval 30mm Medak); guns, MANPAD's.
- Aircraft carried: 1 HAL Chetak

INS Shardul was a Kumbhir-class tank landing ship of the Indian Navy.

== History ==
Built at the Gdańsk Shipyard in Poland, INS Shardul was commissioned on 24 December 1975. She was decommissioned in June 1997.

Her legacy was carried forward by the lead vessel of the Shardul-class tank landing ships, INS Shardul.

== See also ==
- Ships of the Indian Navy
- Polnocny-class landing ship
