= INS Kesari =

The following ships of the Indian Navy have been named INS Kesari:

- INS Kesari (1975) was a Kumbhir-class tank landing ship of the Indian Navy, decommissioned in 1999
- INS Kesari (2005) is a Shardul-class amphibious warfare vessel, currently in active service
