= INS Sharabh =

History
- Name: INS Sharabh
- Namesake: Sharabha
- Builder: Gdańsk Shipyard; Stocznia Gdynia
- Commissioned: 27 January 1976
- Decommissioned: 15 July 2011
- Identification: Pennant number: L17

General characteristics
- Class & type: Kumbhir-class tank landing ship
- Displacement: 1120 tons (standard)
- Length: 83.9 m
- Beam: 9.7 m
- Draught: 1.3 metres (extreme bow and 2.58 metres (stern)
- Depth: 5.2 m
- Propulsion: 2 x 2200 hp Soviet Kolomna 40-D two stroke diesel engines.
- Speed: 18 knots
- Complement: 120 (incl. 12 officers)
- Sensors & processing systems: SRN 7453 radar
- Armament: 2 × AK-230 30mm guns; 4 × CRN-91 AA (Naval 30mm Medak); guns, MANPAD's.
- Aircraft carried: 1 HAL Chetak

INS Sharabh was a Kumbhir-class tank landing ship of the Indian Navy

It also regularly participated in multinational exercises like MILAN, CORPAT, SIMBEX and PASSEX. In her final year of commission the ship completed almost 100 days at sea and participated in India-Indonesian Coordinated Patrol (CORPAT) at Belawan, Indonesia and the subsequent Passing Exercise (PASEX) in November 2010.

In recognition to her indomitable spirit and devotion, the ship was awarded the coveted "Unit Citation" by Chief of the Naval Staff in 2003.

INS Sharabh was commissioned in the Indian Navy in January 1976 at Gdynia, Poland. It was the fourth in the series of Landing Ship Tanks bought by the Indian Navy.

Lieutenant Commander P C B Nair was the commissioning commanding officer of the ship and since was commanded subsequently by 28 officers in 35 years of commissioned service. The commissioning executive officer was Lt. Lalit Kumar.

Commander Sanjay Kumar was the last officer to command the ship.

The ship was also instrumental in apprehension of prohibited items off Tilanchang Island from Myanmar poachers in January this year.

== See also ==
- Ships of the Indian Navy
- Polnocny-class landing ship
