= INS Kesari (1975) =

Tank landing ship of the Indian Navy

History

India
- Name: INS Kesari
- Namesake: Saffron
- Builder: Gdańsk Shipyard; Stocznia Gdynia
- Commissioned: 15 August 1975
- Decommissioned: 8 May 1999
- Identification: Pennant number: L15
- Status: Decommissioned

General characteristics
- Class & type: Kumbhir-class tank landing ship
- Displacement: 1,120 tons (standard)
- Length: 83.9 m (275.3 ft)
- Beam: 9.7 m (31.8 ft)
- Draught: 1.3 m (4.3 ft) (extreme bow and 2.58 metres (stern)
- Depth: 5.2 m (17.1 ft)
- Propulsion: 2 x 2,200 hp (1,600 kW) Soviet Kolomna 40-D two stroke diesel engines.
- Speed: 18 knots (33 km/h; 21 mph)
- Complement: 120 (incl. 12 officers)
- Sensors & processing systems: SRN 7453 radar
- Armament: 2 × AK-230 30 mm guns; 4 × CRN-91 AA (Naval 30 mm Medak); guns, MANPAD's.
- Aircraft carried: 1 HAL Chetak

INS Kesari was a Kumbhir-class tank landing ship of the Indian Navy.

== Capabilities ==
The INS Kesari is capable of transporting troops, tanks, and other heavy equipment, as well as providing support during disaster relief operations. It has a displacement of 7,500 tons, a length of 175 meters, and a breadth of 32 meters. The ship has a top speed of 25 knots and can accommodate up to 900 personnel.

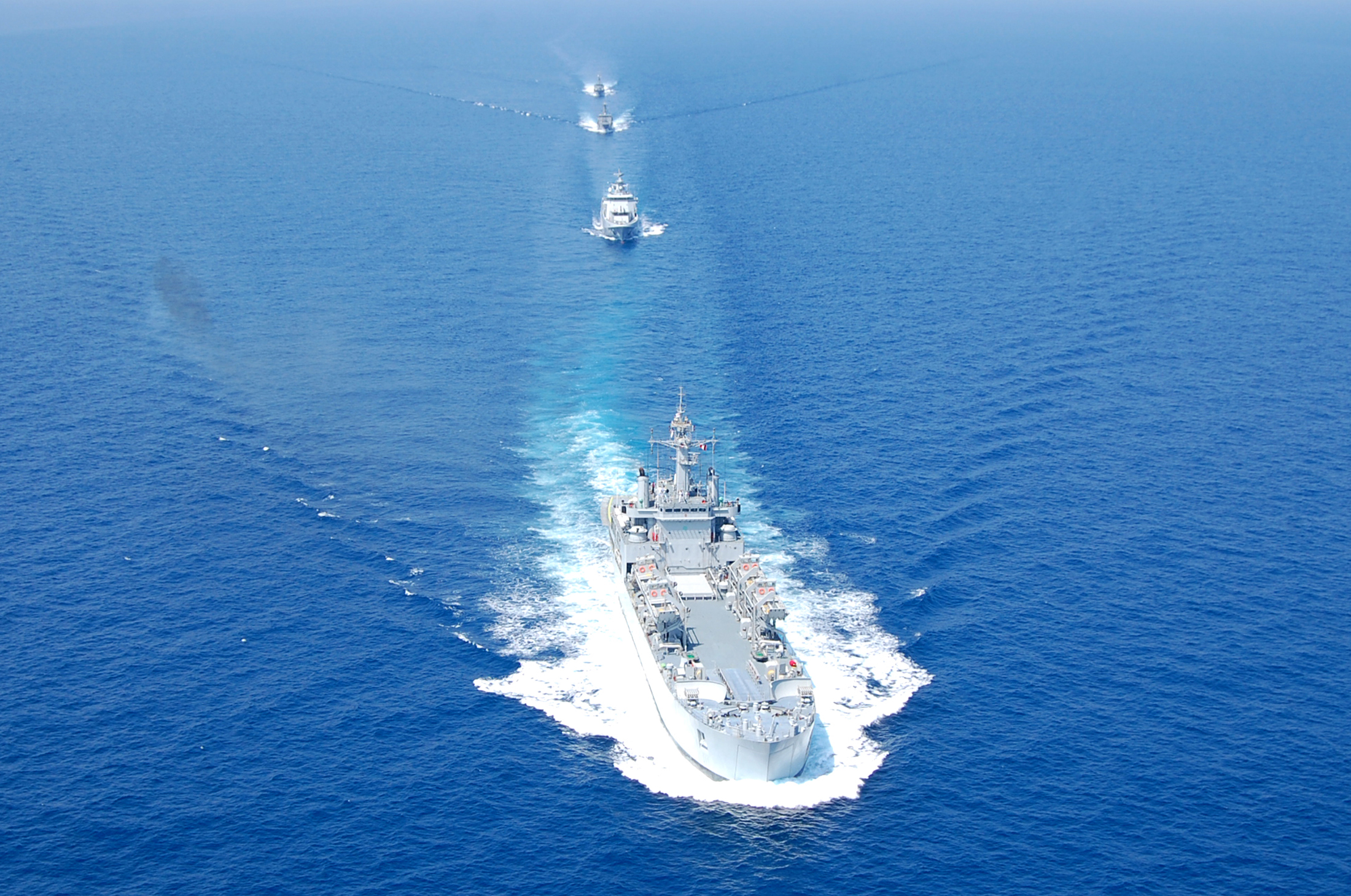
INS Kesari at sea

== History ==
Built at the Gdańsk Shipyard in Poland, INS Kesari was commissioned on 15 August 1975. She was decommissioned on 8 May 1999.

Her legacy was carried forward by the Shardul-class tank landing ship, INS Kesari.

== See also ==
- Ships of the Indian Navy
