= INS Kumbhir =

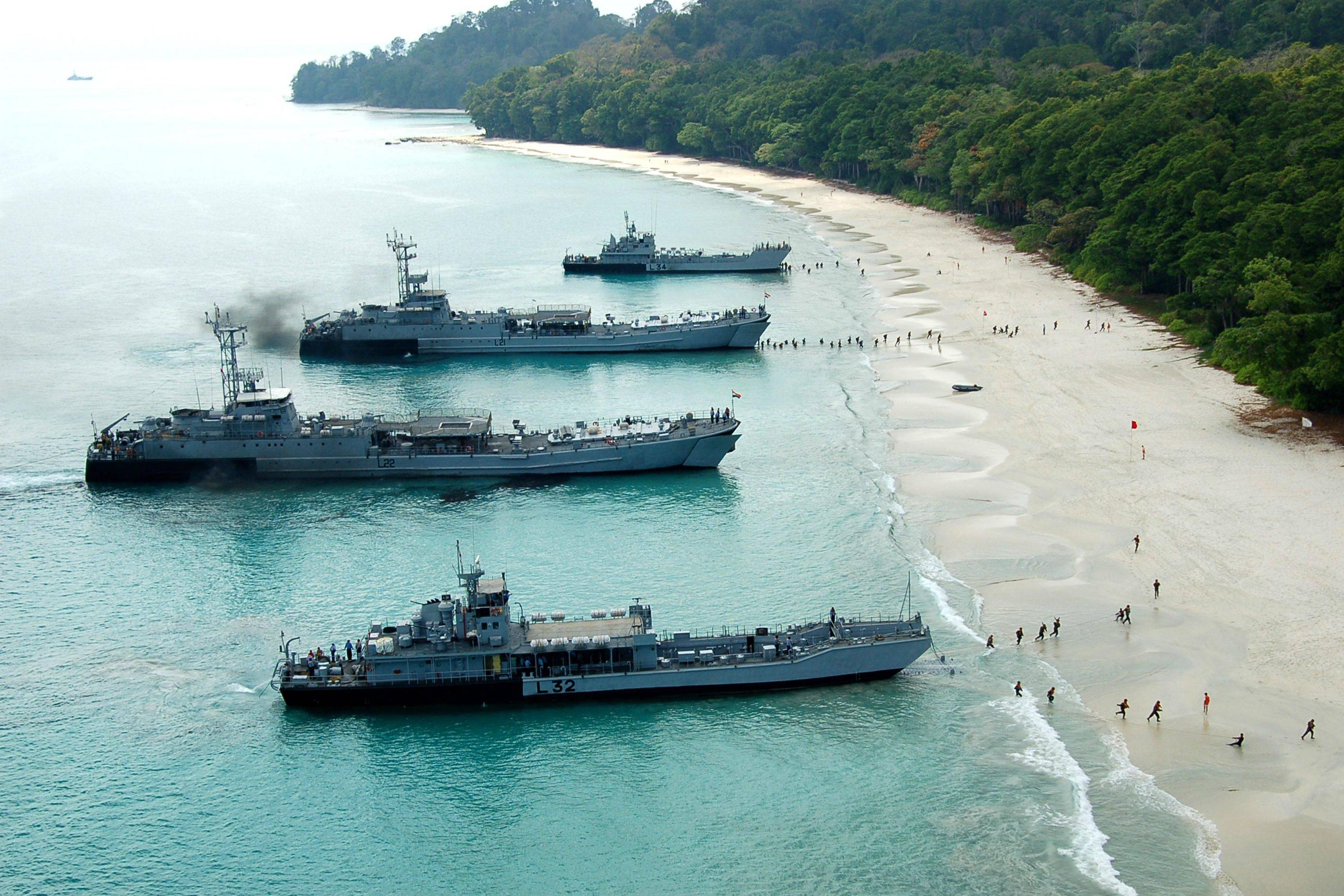
- INS Kumbhir (third ship from top)

History
- Name: INS Kumbhir
- Namesake: Crocodile
- Builder: Gdańsk Shipyard; Stocznia Gdynia
- Commissioned: November 1986
- Decommissioned: 12 January 2024
- Identification: Pennant number: L22
- Status: Decommissioned

General characteristics
- Class & type: Kumbhir-class tank landing ship
- Displacement: 1120 tons (standard)
- Length: 83.9 m
- Beam: 9.7 m
- Draught: 1.3 metres (extreme bow and 2.58 metres (stern)
- Depth: 5.2 m
- Propulsion: 2 x 2200 hp Soviet Kolomna 40-D two stroke diesel engines.
- Speed: 18 knots (33 km/h; 21 mph)
- Complement: 120 (incl. 12 officers)
- Sensors & processing systems: SRN 7453 radar
- Armament: 2 × AK-230 30mm guns; 4 × CRN-91 AA (Naval 30mm Medak); guns, MANPAD's.
- Aircraft carried: 1 HAL Chetak

INS Kumbhir was the lead vessel of her class of the amphibious warfare ships of the Indian Navy.

== History ==
Built at the Gdańsk Shipyard in Poland, INS Kumbhir was commissioned in November 1986. After over 37 years of service, the ship was decommissioned on 12 January 2024.
