= INS Magar =

The following ships of the Indian Navy have been named INS Magar:

- INS Magar (1949) was an amphibious warfare ship acquired in 1949 from the Royal Navy, where it served in World War II as HMS Avenger (LST 3011)
- INS Magar (L20) is the lead vessel of her class of amphibious warfare vessels, currently in active service with the Indian Navy
