= INS Mahish =

Kumbhir-class landing ship of the Indian Navy

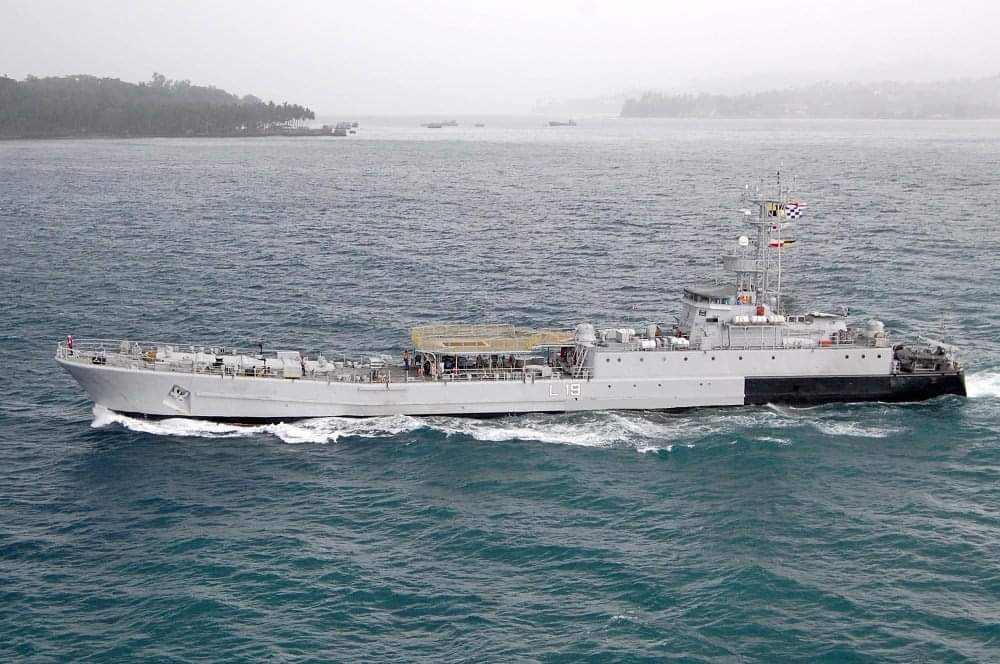
- INS Mahish

History
- Name: INS Mahish
- Namesake: Water Buffalo
- Builder: Gdańsk Shipyard; Stocznia Gdynia
- Commissioned: 4 June 1985
- Decommissioned: 11 November 2016
- Identification: Pennant number: L19
- Fate: Decommissioned

General characteristics
- Class & type: Kumbhir-class landing ship
- Displacement: 1120 tons (standard)
- Length: 83.9 m
- Beam: 9.7 m
- Draught: 1.3 metres (extreme bow and 2.58 metres (stern)
- Depth: 5.2 m
- Propulsion: 2 x 2200 hp Soviet Kolomna 40-D two stroke diesel engines.
- Speed: 18 knots (33 km/h; 21 mph)
- Complement: 120 (incl. 12 officers)
- Sensors & processing systems: SRN 7453 radar
- Armament: 2 × AK-230 30mm guns; 4 × CRN-91 AA (Naval 30mm Medak); guns, MANPAD's.
- Aircraft carried: 1 HAL Chetak

INS Mahish is a Kumbhir-class landing ship of the Indian Navy.

== History ==
Built at the Gdańsk Shipyard in Poland, INS Mahish was commissioned on 4 June 1985. The ship was decommissioned on 11 November 2016 at Port Blair. Her last commanding office was Commoder Harkesh Yadav.
