= INS Guldar =

Kumbhir-class landing ship of the Indian Navy

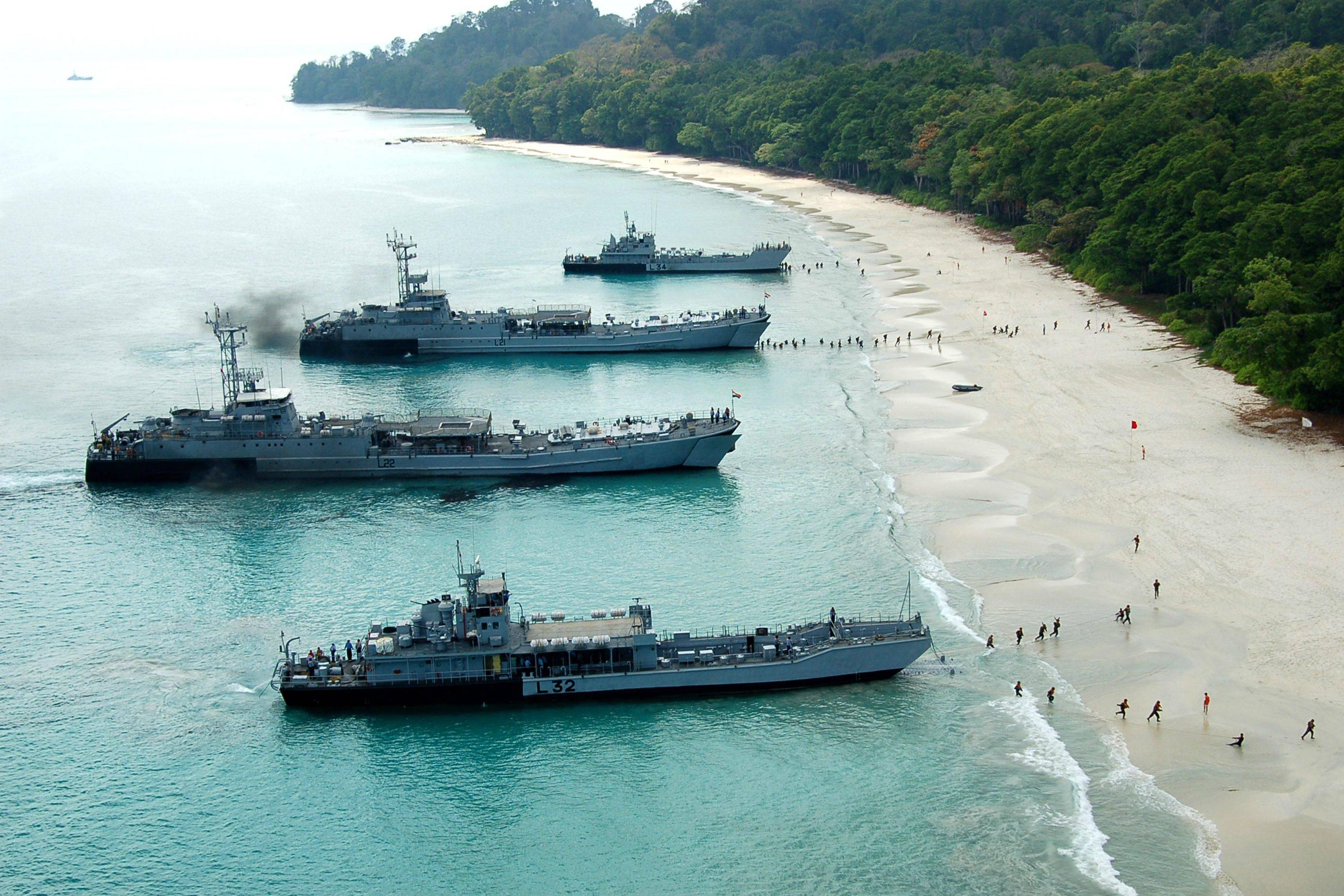
- INS Guldar (second ship from top)

History
- Name: INS Guldar
- Namesake: Leopard
- Builder: Gdańsk Shipyard; Stocznia Gdynia
- Commissioned: December 1985
- Decommissioned: 12 January 2024
- Identification: Pennant number: L21
- Status: Decommissioned

General characteristics
- Class & type: Kumbhir-class landing ship
- Displacement: 1120 tons (standard)
- Length: 83.9 m
- Beam: 9.7 m
- Draught: 1.3 metres (extreme bow and 2.58 metres (stern)
- Depth: 5.2 m
- Propulsion: 2 x 2200 hp Soviet Kolomna 40-D two stroke diesel engines.
- Speed: 18 knots (33 km/h; 21 mph)
- Complement: 120 (incl. 12 officers)
- Sensors & processing systems: SRN 7453 radar
- Armament: 2 × AK-230 30mm guns; 2 × WM18A rocket launcher; MANPADs.
- Aircraft carried: 1 HAL Chetak

INS Guldar was a Kumbhir-class landing ship of the Indian Navy.

== History ==
Built at the Gdańsk Shipyard in Poland, INS Guldar was commissioned in December 1985. After over 38 years of service, the ship was decommissioned on 12 January 2024. The ship was planned to be sunk off the coast of the Sindhudurg district in Maharashtra and be used for scuba diving and tourism. The sinking was conducted successfully by May 2026, with the ship resting at a depth of 22 meters below Niviti rock formation. The ship won the Golden Banyan Award 2026 under The Week Heritage Awards for tourist destinations in Maharastra. The diving site is jointly managed by Mazagon Docks Ltd and the Maharashtra Tourism Development Corporation, with a joint investment of ₹160 crores.
