= INS Cheetah =

Kumbhir-class tank landing ship of the Indian Navy

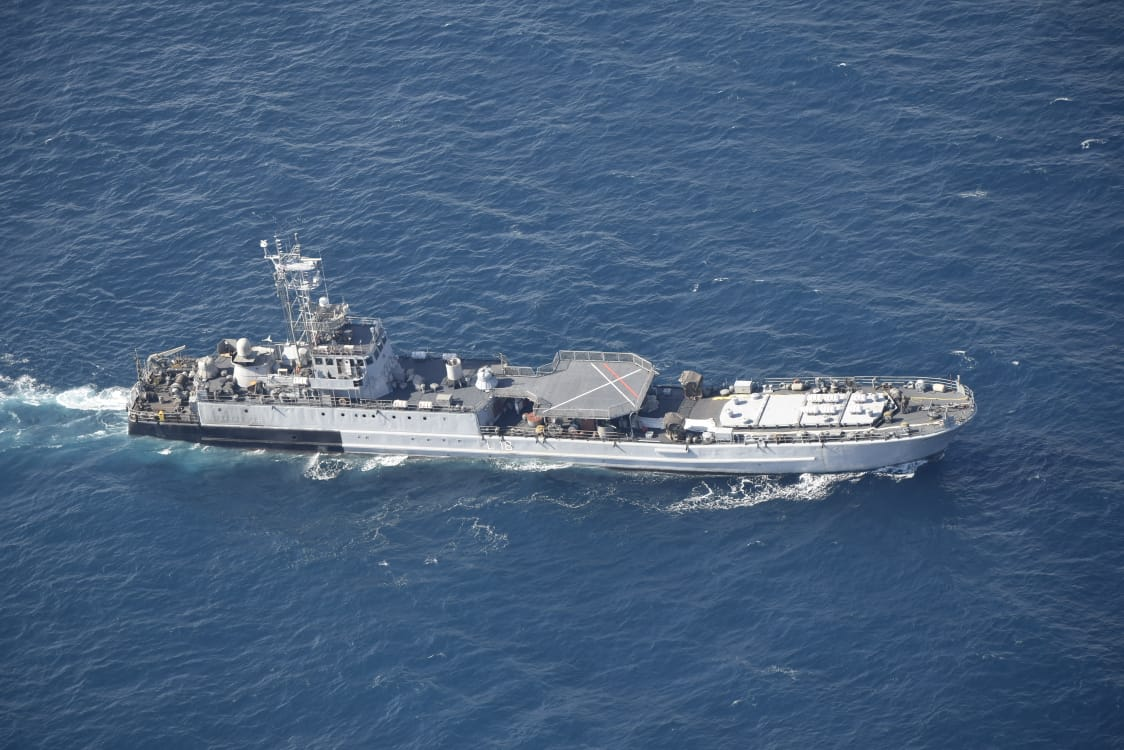
- Cheetah at sea

History

India
- Name: INS Cheetah
- Namesake: Cheetah
- Builder: Gdańsk Shipyard; Stocznia Gdynia
- Commissioned: 30 November 1984
- Decommissioned: 12 January 2024
- Identification: Pennant number: L18
- Status: Decommissioned

General characteristics
- Class & type: Kumbhir-class tank landing ship
- Displacement: 1120 tons (standard)
- Length: 83.9 m
- Beam: 9.7 m
- Draught: 1.3 metres (extreme bow and 2.58 metres (stern)
- Depth: 5.2 m
- Propulsion: 2 x 2200 hp Soviet Kolomna 40-D two stroke diesel engines.
- Speed: 18 knots (33 km/h; 21 mph)
- Complement: 120 (incl. 12 officers)
- Sensors & processing systems: SRN 7453 radar
- Armament: 2 × AK-230 30mm guns(absoluted)
- Aircraft carried: 1 HAL Chetak

INS Cheetah was a Kumbhir-class tank landing ship of the Indian Navy.

== History ==
Built at the Gdańsk Shipyard in Poland, INS Cheetah was commissioned on 30 November 1984

The ship was decommissioned on 12 January 2024.
