= INS Ghorpad =

History

India
- Name: INS Ghorpad
- Namesake: Bengal monitor
- Builder: Gdańsk Shipyard; Stocznia Gdynia
- Commissioned: 21 December 1974
- Decommissioned: 11 January 2008
- Identification: Pennant number: L14
- Status: Decommissioned

General characteristics
- Class & type: Kumbhir-class tank landing ship
- Displacement: 1120 tons (standard)
- Length: 83.9 m
- Beam: 9.7 m
- Draught: 1.3 metres (extreme bow and 2.58 metres (stern)
- Depth: 5.2 m
- Propulsion: 2 x 2200 hp Soviet Kolomna 40-D two stroke diesel engines.
- Speed: 18 knots
- Complement: 120 (incl. 12 officers)
- Sensors & processing systems: SRN 7453 radar
- Armament: 2 × AK-230 30mm guns; 4 × CRN-91 AA (Naval 30mm Medak); guns, MANPAD's.
- Aircraft carried: 1 HAL Chetak

INS Ghorpad was a Kumbhir-class tank landing ship of the Indian Navy.

== History ==
Built at the Gdańsk Shipyard in Poland, INS Ghorpad was commissioned on 21 December 1974. She was decommissioned on 11 January 2008.

== See also ==
- Ships of the Indian Navy
