= INS Gharial =

Indian amphibious warfare vessel

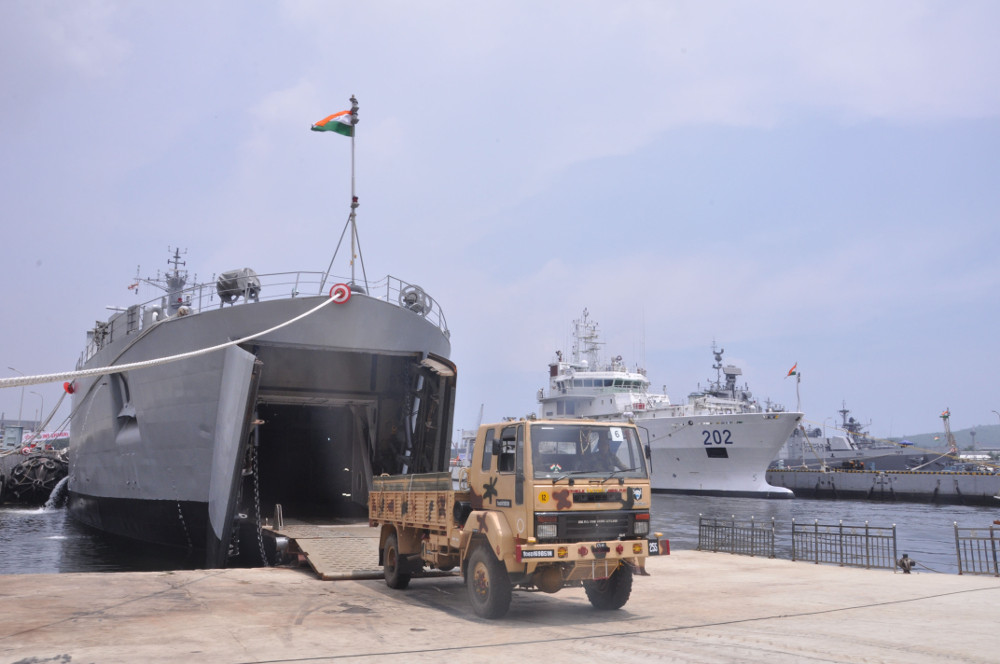
- INS Gharial demonstrating unloading of relief material through its bow door onto the ramp.

History

India
- Name: INS Gharial
- Namesake: Gharial
- Builder: Hindustan Shipyard Limited; Garden Reach Shipbuilders and Engineers
- Commissioned: 14 February 1997
- Identification: Pennant number: L23
- Status: Active

General characteristics
- Class & type: Magar-class amphibious warfare vessel
- Displacement: 5665 tons (full load)
- Length: 120 m
- Beam: 17.5 m
- Draft: 4 m
- Ramps: Bow doors
- Propulsion: 2 × 8560 hp sustained diesel engine
- Speed: 15 knots
- Range: 3000 miles @ 14 knots
- Boats & landing craft carried: 4 LCVPs
- Capacity: 15 Tanks, 8 APCs
- Troops: 500
- Complement: 136 (incl 16 officers)
- Sensors & processing systems: 1 BEL 1245 navigation radar
- Electronic warfare & decoys: BEL Ajanta as intercept
- Armament: 4 × Bofors 40 mm/60 guns; 2 × 122 mm multiple-barrel rocket launchers
- Aircraft carried: 1 Sea King
- Aviation facilities: 2 helicopter platforms

INS Gharial (Note: Gharial is a long-snouted, fish-eating crocodilian native to the Indian subcontinent) is a Magar-class amphibious warfare vessel of the Indian Navy.

== Service history ==
On 8 November 2024, Indian Navy gifted two Solas Marine fast interceptor boat to Mozambique Navy which were carried onboard INS Gharial. The Fast Interceptor Crafts are capable of reaching speeds of 45 kn (83 km/h; 52 mph) and equipped with machine guns and bullet-resistant cabins. They will significantly enhance Mozambique's capability to address maritime threats, including terrorism and insurgency in Cabo Delgado region.

On 7 December 2025, INS Gharial, carrying 645 tons of relief material, was dispatched from Chennai and arrived in Trincomalee, Sri Lanka on 8 December. in support of India's Operation Sagar Bandhu, a Humanitarian Assistance and Disaster Relief (HADR) mission to support Sri Lanka following the devastating Cyclone Ditwah. One day earlier, three Mk. IV LCUs including LCU 51, LCU 54 and LCU 57, transferred 352 tons of relief material, from Tuticorin to Colombo, Sri Lanka.

On 6 February 2026, the Indian Army and the Indian Navy, in partnership with Garden Reach Shipbuilders & Engineers, delivered 10 extra-wide modular bailey bridge systems onboard INS Gharial. The Indian Army and Sri Lanka’s Road Development Authority are undertaking damage assessment for seven critical bridge sites across Central, Uva and Sabaragamuwa Province. Later that month, she participated at the International Fleet Review 2026 held at Visakapatanam.
