= SS Olza =

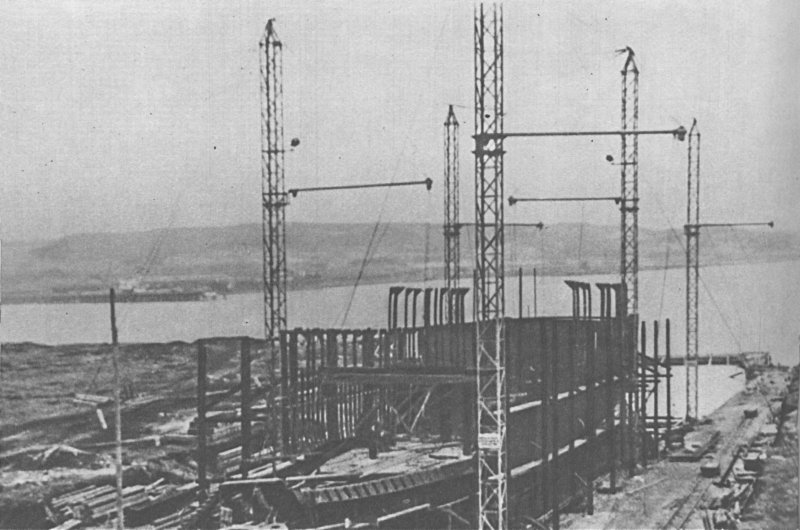
- SS Olza in late 1938 or early 1939

History

Poland
- Name: SS Olza
- Owner: Żegluga Polska
- Ordered: 1938
- Builder: Gdynia Shipyard
- Laid down: 28 August 1938
- Launched: 8 September 1939
- Fate: taken over by Nazi Germany in September 1939

History

Nazi Germany
- Name: Westpreussen
- Acquired: 14 September 1939
- Fate: taken over by Soviet Union in 1945

History

Soviet Union
- Name: Ingul
- Acquired: 1945
- Fate: Scrapped in June 1970

General characteristics
- Tonnage: 1250 t
- Length: 68,22 m
- Beam: 10,67 m
- Height: 6,55 m
- Installed power: 850 km (625 kW)
- Propulsion: 1 x Lentz system steam engine

SS Olza was the first dry cargo freighter built in Poland after the country regained independence in 1918, and the only large commercial ship built before World War II. Owned by the Żegluga Polska company, she was named after the Olza River which flows through Cieszyn Silesia.

In 1918 Poland regained independence and based on President Woodrow Wilson's promise to grant Poland access to the sea the newly formed Polish Republic obtained the Polish Corridor and a tiny strip of Baltic Sea coast. However, Poland was not granted the port of Danzig (Gdańsk) and the city was turned into the Free City of Danzig. Thus, despite retaining some rights and limited sovereignty over the city, Poland had no port of her own - nor any shipyards. To ensure its foreign trade and shipping were independent, the port of Gdynia was built, mainly due to the efforts of Eugeniusz Kwiatkowski, along with several shipyards serving both the Polish Navy and the merchant marine. Simultaneously, various Polish universities started to teach a cadre of future naval engineers. Among them was Henryk Giełdzik, a young engineer and a graduate of the Danzig university of technology. Within a relatively short time of some years Gdynia became a flourishing sea port and a serious competitor to the Free City.

The shipyards at Gdynia initially focused on smaller vessels, suitable for off-shore duty of Baltic Sea cruises, but not for the high seas. However, by the late 1930s the shipyards gathered enough experience and a decision was made to build a large dry cargo ship for the Polish merchant marine, the first such vessel built entirely at home. Designed by Henryk Giełdzik, the ship was named SS Olza, after an eponymous river flowing through Cieszyn Silesia.

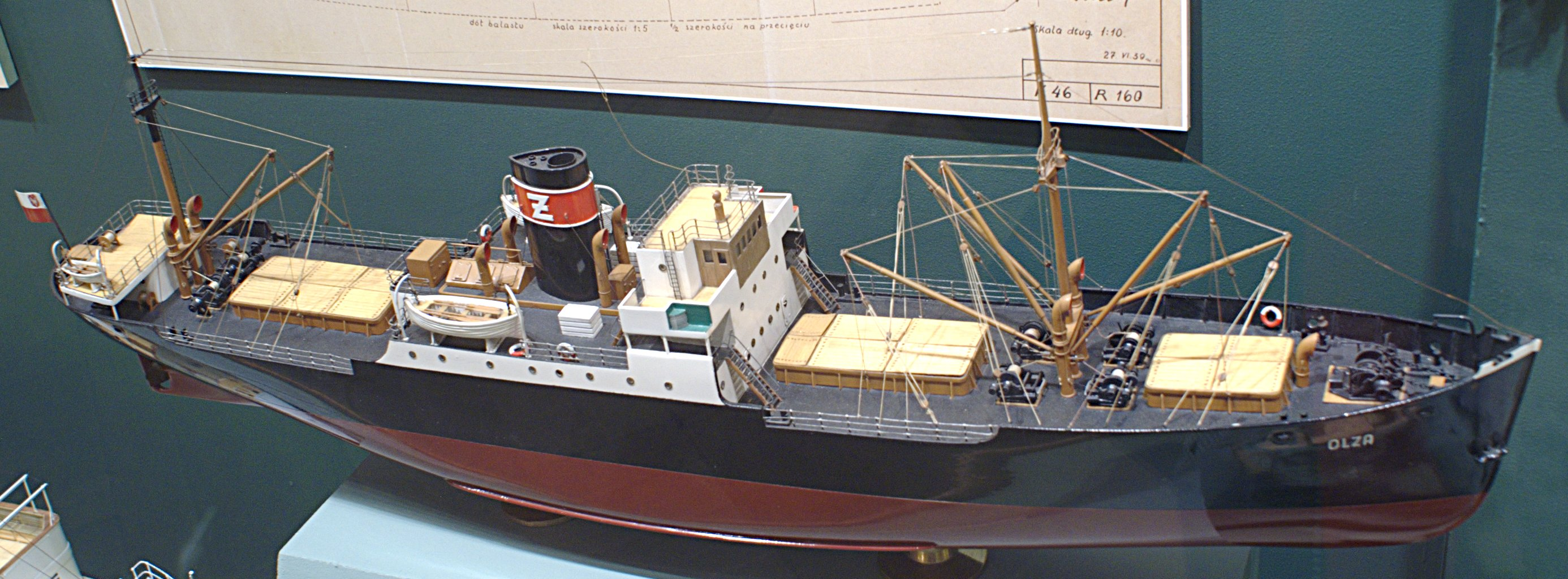
Model of the Olza in the National Maritime Museum in Gdańsk.

The keel was laid 28 August 1938 in the Gdynia Shipyard. Most of the elements were produced by Świętochłowice-based Zgoda Steel Works, while minor parts were purchased from other contractors in Poland and the United Kingdom. The works continued as planned and launching was scheduled for mid-September 1939. However, on 1 September 1939 Germany invaded Poland starting World War II. As the Polish-German border was only a dozen or so kilometres from Gdynia, the shipyard was almost on the front line. Because of that, it was decided to launch the ship prematurely on 8 September 1939, in order to block the slipway in case the shipyard came under German control.

Following the German takeover of Gdynia, the ship was remodelled and drafted into the German marine, eventually renamed in May 1941 to "Westpreussen". The ship was moved from port to port, eventually docking in Königsberg, where it was seized by the advancing Red Army.

The further fate of the ship was long unknown. She was not returned to Poland after the war and no trace of her has been found in German archives. An investigation intended to find the ship was carried out in the 1980s by Polish Television. It was discovered that the ship was reworked by the Soviets in 1958 to be a part of the Kaliningrad fishing fleet, and renamed "Ingul (Russian: ИНГУЛ)". The ship was in operation until June 1970, when it was recalled and eventually scrapped.
