= INS Magar (L20) =

Indian Navy amphibious warfare vessel

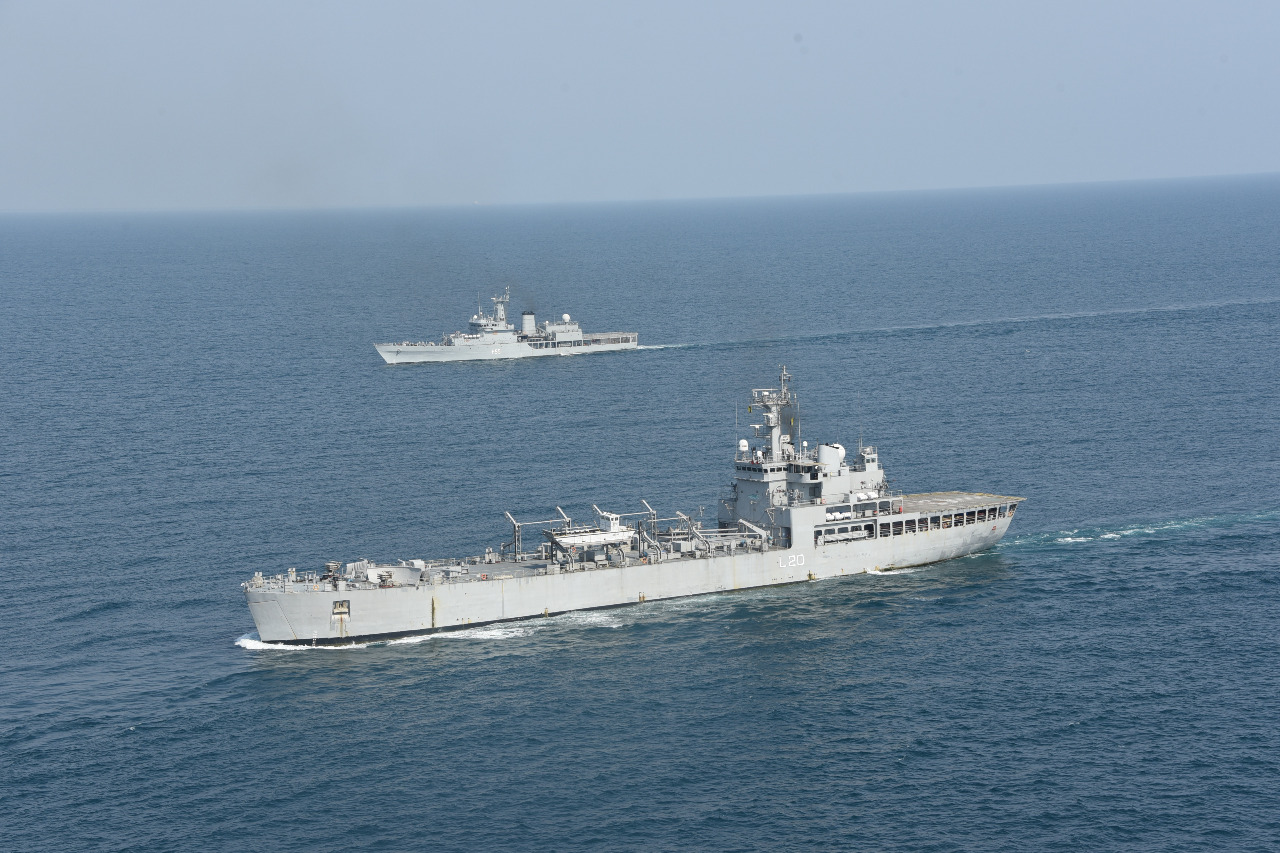
- INS Magar with INS Sujata at sea

History

India
- Name: INS Magar
- Namesake: Muggar crocodile
- Builder: Hindustan Shipyard Limited; Garden Reach Shipbuilders and Engineers
- Commissioned: 15 July 1987
- Decommissioned: 6 May 2023
- Home port: Kochi, Southern Naval Command
- Identification: Pennant number: L20
- Status: Decommissioned

General characteristics
- Class & type: Magar-class amphibious warfare vessel
- Displacement: 5,665 tonnes (6,245 short tons) (full load)
- Length: 120 metres (390 ft)
- Beam: 17.5 metres (57 ft)
- Draft: 4 metres (13 ft)
- Ramps: Bow doors
- Propulsion: 2 × 8,560 horsepower (6,380 kW) sustained diesel engine
- Speed: 15 knots (28 km/h)
- Range: 3,000 miles (2,600 nmi) @ 14 knots (26 km/h)
- Boats & landing craft carried: 4 × LCVPs
- Capacity: 15 Tanks, 8 APCs
- Troops: 500
- Complement: 136 (incl 16 officers)
- Sensors & processing systems: 1 × BEL 1245 navigation radar
- Electronic warfare & decoys: BEL Ajanta as intercept
- Armament: 4 × Bofors 40 mm/60 guns; 2 × 122 mm multiple-barrel rocket launchers
- Aircraft carried: 1 x Sea King
- Aviation facilities: 2 x helicopter platforms

INS Magar was the lead ship of Magar-class amphibious warfare vessels of the Indian Navy. She was built by Garden Reach Shipbuilders and Engineers, Kolkata and was commissioned by Admiral R.H. Tahiliani, Chief of the Naval Staff on 15 July 1987. The ship has a length of 120 metres and a beam of 17.5 metres. The main weapon systems of the ship consist of CRN 91 Guns, chaff launcher (Kavach) and the WM-18A Rocket launcher. The ship also carries four landing craft vehicle personnel (LCVP) on board, which can be used for the landing of troops.

== History ==
The major operations undertaken by the ship include Operation Pawan (Indian Peace Keeping Force operations in Sri Lanka), wherein she played a pivotal role in movement of logistics supplies to the area of operations, to support the IPKF land forces.

In the wake of the 2004 Tsunami, the ship had provided relief for over 1,300 survivors.

On 22 February 2006, at around 5 pm local time, an accidental fire broke out on the ship. It was caused while the ship was engaged in dumping expired ammunition, and one of the boxes of ammunition caught fire. At the time of the accident, the Magar was in the Bay of Bengal, around 40 nautical miles (70 km) from Visakhapatnam. Casualties included three deaths and a further nineteen sailors sustaining injuries. The injured were rushed to a naval hospital in Visakhapatnam by the Sea King helicopter on board.

In April 2018, the ship changed base port to Kochi, the Indian Navy's training command. She underwent modifications and joined First Training Squadron for training sea officers.

In May 2020, INS Jalashwa and INS Magar were dispatched to Malé, the capital of the Maldives, as part of Phase-I of the evacuation of stranded Indians under Operation Samudra Setu during the Covid pandemic.

After 36 years of service, INS Magar was decommissioned on 6 May 2023.
