= Magar-class amphibious warfare vessel =

Indian Navy landing ships

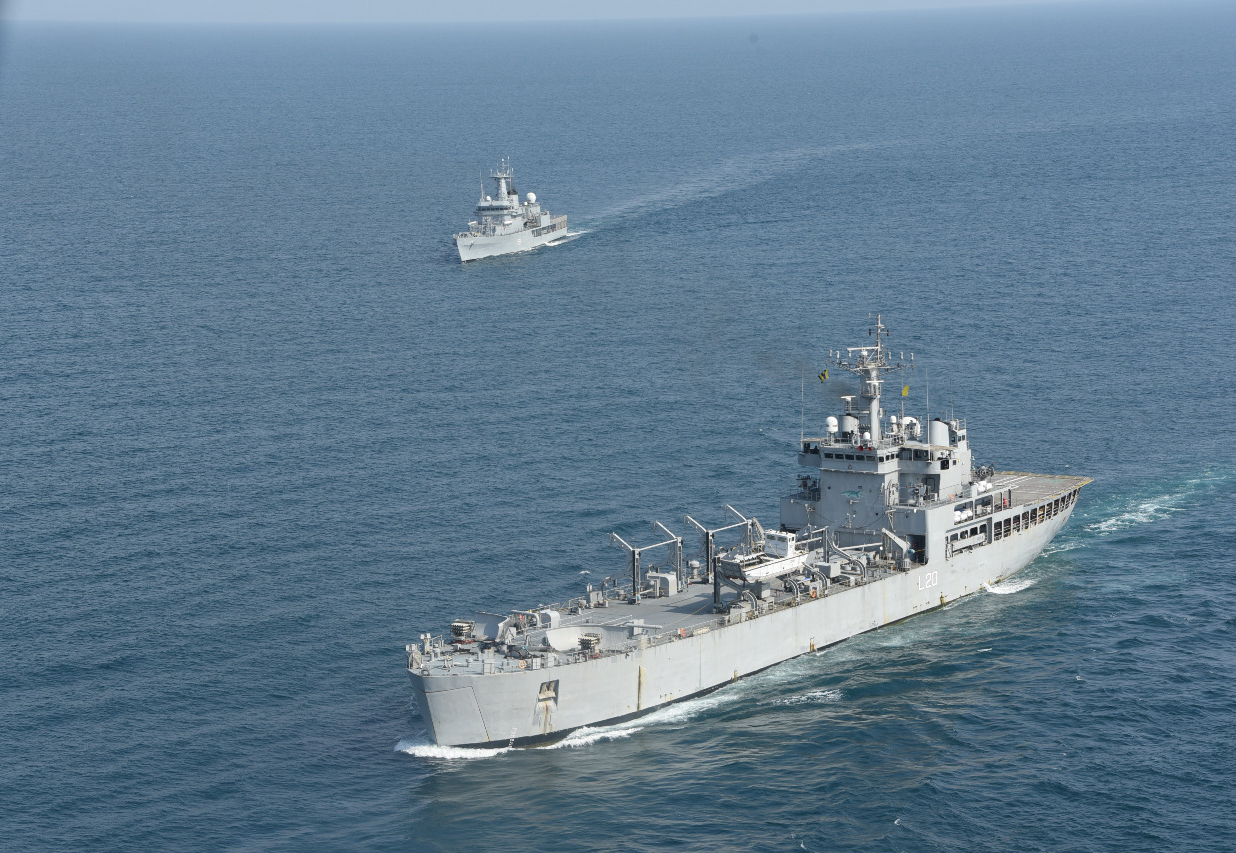
- INS Magar being escorted by INS Sujata

Class overview
- Name: Magar class
- Builders: Hindustan Shipyard Limited; Garden Reach Shipbuilders and Engineers
- Operators: Indian Navy
- Preceded by: Kumbhir class
- Succeeded by: Shardul class
- Planned: 2
- Completed: 2
- Active: 1
- Retired: 1

General characteristics
- Type: Amphibious warfare vessel
- Displacement: 5,665 tons (full load)
- Length: 120 m (390 ft)
- Beam: 17.5 m (57 ft)
- Draught: 4 m (13 ft)
- Ramps: Bow doors
- Propulsion: 2 × 8560 hp sustained diesel engine
- Speed: 15 kn (28 km/h; 17 mph)
- Range: 3,000 nmi (5,600 km; 3,500 mi) @ 14 kn (26 km/h; 16 mph)
- Boats & landing craft carried: 4 × LCVPs
- Capacity: 15 Tanks, 8 APCs
- Troops: 500
- Complement: 136 (incl 16 officers)
- Sensors & processing systems: 1 BEL 1245 navigation radar
- Electronic warfare & decoys: BEL Ajanta as intercept
- Armament: 4 × Bofors 40 mm/60 guns, 2 × 122 mm multiple-barrel rocket launchers
- Aircraft carried: 1 x Sea King
- Aviation facilities: 2 helicopter platforms

The Magar-class (lit. 'Crocodile') landing ships are amphibious warfare vessels of the Indian Navy, currently in active service. Only two ships of the class were designed and built by Hindustan Shipyard Limited, with fitting completed at Garden Reach Shipbuilders and Engineers. The ships also carry four landing craft vehicle personnel (LCVP) on board, which can be used for the landing of troops.

== History ==
The design of the class is based on the Round Table-class ships formerly operated by the Royal Navy. They can operate two medium-lift helicopters, which are primarily meant for inserting small teams of special forces (e.g. MARCOS). To discharge a ship's cargo and most of the troops, it needs to be beached, so that it can utilize its bow-door, similar to an LST.

The ships are stationed at the naval base in Visakhapatnam on India's east coast.

== Ships ==
Name	Pennant Number	Commissioned	Decommissioned	Status
Indian Navy
Magar	L20	18 July 1987	6 May 2023	Decommissioned
Gharial	L23	14 February 1997		Active

== Gallery ==
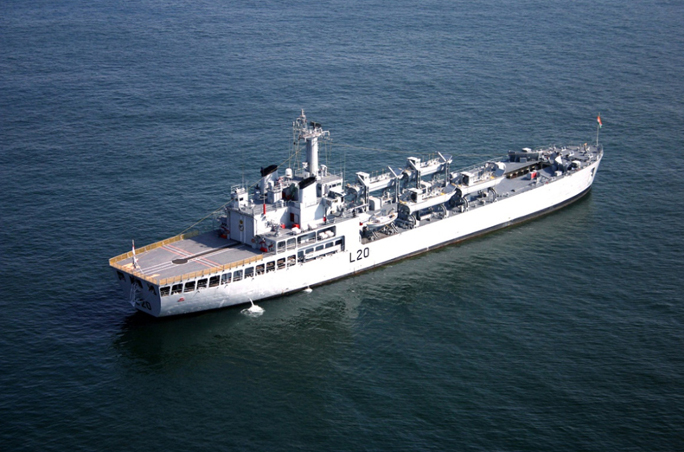
Magar joins Southern Naval Command.

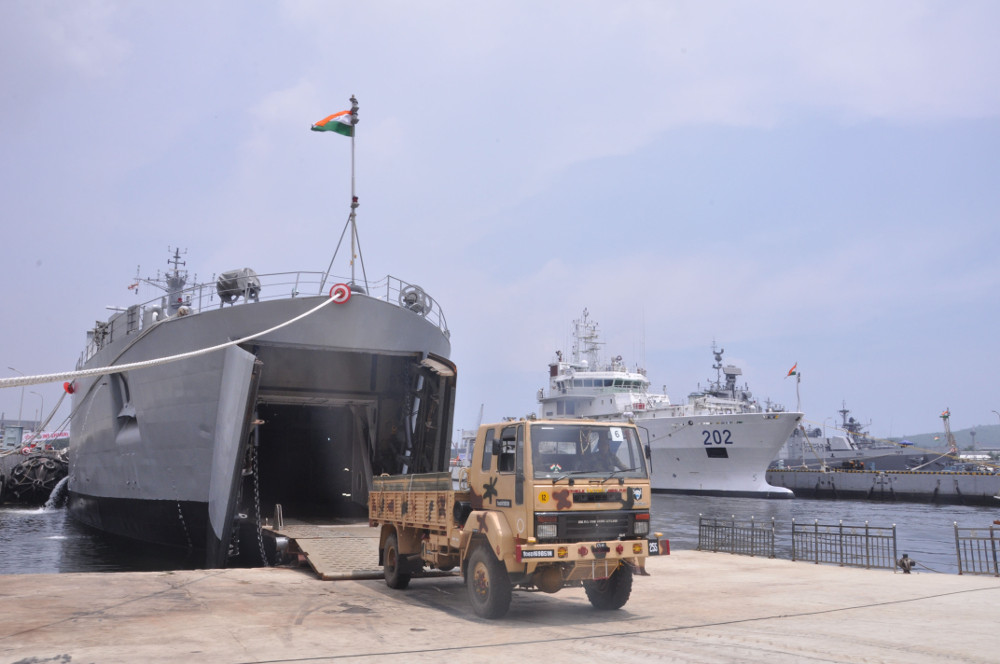
Gharial demonstrating unloading of relief material through its bow door onto the ramp.

Decommissioninng video of Magar

== See also ==
- List of active Indian Navy ships
