= INS Airavat =

Indian Navy ship

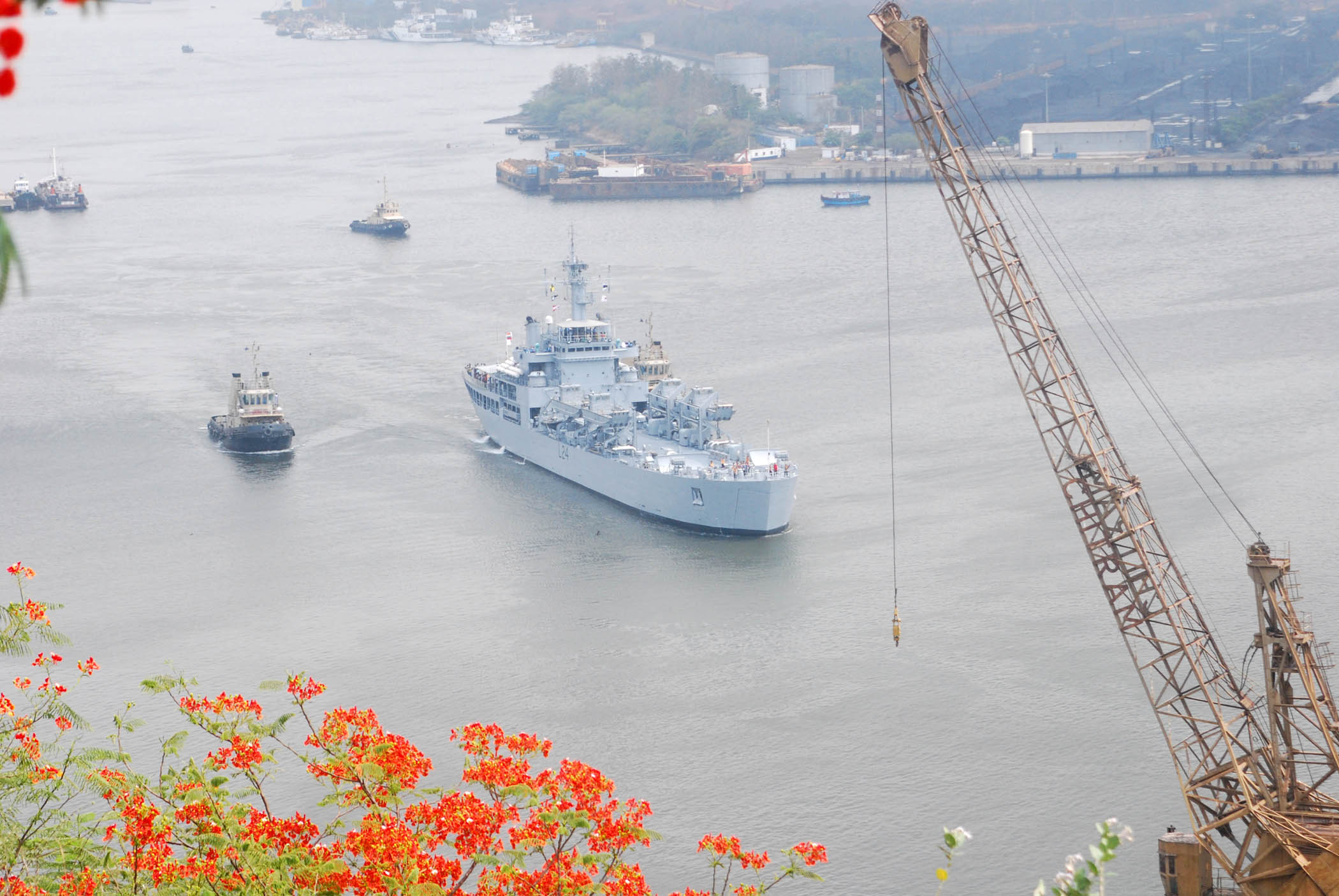
- The INS Airavat sails out of Visakhapatnam harbour after commissioning on 19 May 2009

History

India
- Name: INS Airavat
- Namesake: Indra's mount
- Builder: Garden Reach Shipbuilders & Engineers
- Yard number: Yard 3016
- Commissioned: 19 May 2009
- Identification: Pennant number: L24
- Status: Active

General characteristics
- Class & type: Shardul-class tank landing ship
- Displacement: 5650 tons
- Length: 125 m (410 ft)
- Beam: 17.5 m (57 ft)
- Draught: 4 m (13 ft)
- Propulsion: Kirloskar PA6 STC engines
- Speed: 16 kn (30 km/h; 18 mph)
- Capacity: 11 MBT; 10 infantry trucks or APC; 500 troops
- Troops: 500
- Complement: 11 officers, 145 sailors
- Electronic warfare & decoys: Chaff launchers
- Armament: 2 × WM-18 rocket launchers; 4 × CRN-91 AA (Naval 30 mm Medak) guns, MANPAD's; shoulder-launched IGLA SAMs
- Aircraft carried: 1 Westland Sea King or HAL Dhruv

INS Airavat (L24) is the third Shardul-class tank landing ship of the Indian Navy.

== History ==
INS Airavat was built by Garden Reach Shipbuilders & Engineers in Kolkata at Yard 2016. She began sea trials in July 2008 after completing basin trials in May. She was commissioned at the Eastern Naval Command in Visakhapatnam on 19 May 2009, by the Chief of Naval Staff, Admiral Sureesh Mehta. She is named for the mount of god Indra, the elephant Airavata, as mentioned in the Rigveda.

== Design ==
Safety features aboard the Airavat include anti-roll flume stabilisation system, smoke curtains to impede spreading of smoke and toxic gases in case of fire, as well as battle damage control systems. Fully loaded, she can operate independently at high seas for up to 45 days.

While primarily designed for amphibious assault operations, Airavat's missions also include humanitarian assistance & disaster relief (HADR) during natural disasters, including tsunamis, cyclones and earthquakes. She has a fully functioning hospital on board, the capacity to carry 500 soldiers, and can provide stern refuelling for other naval vessels.

Primary suppliers for her equipment are Bharat Electronics Limited, Kirloskar Oil Engines, Larsen & Toubro, Hindustan Aeronautics Limited, Keltron and the Godrej Group.

== Deployments ==
On 11 July 2011, INS Airavat made a goodwill visit to Sihanoukville, Cambodia. Between 19 and 28 July 2011, she made courtesy calls at Nha Trang and Hai Phong in Vietnam.

On 1 May 2016, INS Airavat arrived at Brunei to participate in the ADMM Plus (ASEAN Defence Ministers Meeting Plus) Exercise on Maritime Security and Counter Terrorism(Ex MS & CT) which took place from 1–9 May 2016. During the exercise, she engaged with participating navies from Brunei, Singapore, Indonesia, Philippines, Thailand, Vietnam, Malaysia, Myanmar, China, Japan, Russia, Australia, Republic of Korea and the United States, through professional interactions in harbor and complex operations at sea.

In November 2020, as part of Mission Sagar-II, INS Airavat delivered food aid to Sudan, South Sudan, Djibouti and Eritrea. She participated at the International Fleet Review 2026 held at Visakapatanam.
