= Kumbhir-class tank landing ship =

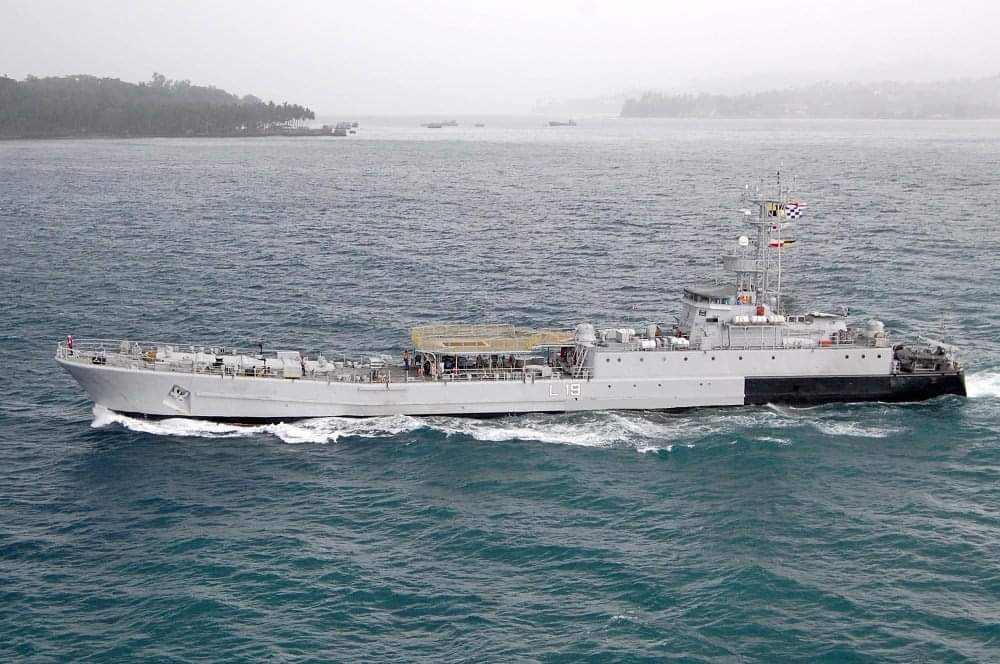
- INS Mahish sailing through Indian Ocean.

Class overview
- Name: Kumbhir class
- Operators: Indian Navy
- Preceded by: Gharial class (Polnocny-A)
- Succeeded by: Magar class
- In service: 1974 – 2024
- Completed: 8
- Retired: 8

General characteristics
- Type: Tank landing ship
- Displacement: 1,120 tons (standard)
- Length: 83.9 m (275 ft)
- Beam: 9.7 m (32 ft)
- Speed: 18 kn (33 km/h; 21 mph)
- Complement: 40 (incl 5 officers)
- Sensors & processing systems: SRN 7453 radar
- Armament: 2 × AK-230 30 mm guns; 4 × CRN-91 AA (Naval 30 mm Medak) guns, MANPADs.
- Aircraft carried: 1 HAL Chetak

Kumbhir-class landing ships were a class of 8 medium amphibious warfare vessels of the Indian Navy.

== Service history ==
The last of the 3 remaining ships Cheetah, Guldar and Kumbhir were decommissioned on 12 January 2024 after nearly 40 years of service.

== Ships of the class ==
Name	Pennant Number	Commissioned	Decommissioned	Homeport	Status
Indian Navy
Ghorpad	L14	21 December 1974	11 January 2008	Visakhapatnam	Decommissioned
Kesari	L15	15 August 1975	8 May 1999	Visakhapatnam	Decommissioned
Shardul	L16	24 December 1975	June 1997	Visakhapatnam	Decommissioned
Sharabh	L17	27 January 1976	15 July 2011	Visakhapatnam	Decommissioned
Cheetah	L18	February 1985	12 January 2024	Port Blair	Decommissioned
Mahish	L19	4 June 1985	11 November 2016	Port Blair	Decommissioned
Guldar	L21	December 1985	12 January 2024	Port Blair	Decommissioned
Kumbhir	L22	November 1986	12 January 2024	Port Blair	Decommissioned

== Gallery ==
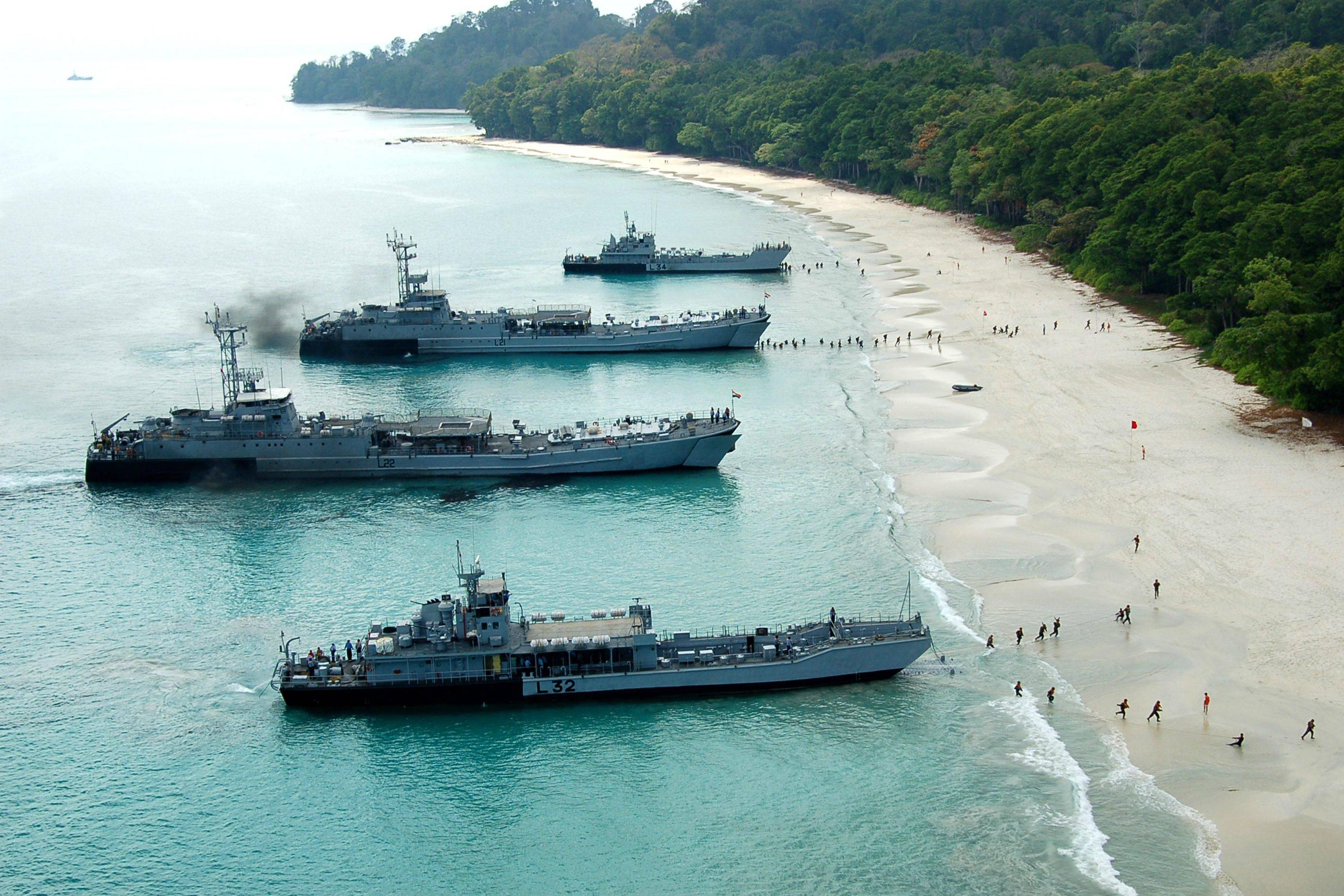
INS Guldar and INS Kumbhir with LCU Mk. II ships during a beaching operation.

== See also ==
- List of active Indian Navy ships
- List of ships of the Indian Navy

Equivalent landing ships of the same era

- BATRAL class
- Type 079
- Polnocny class
