= Polnocny-class landing ship =

1967 Soviet amphibious warfare ship class

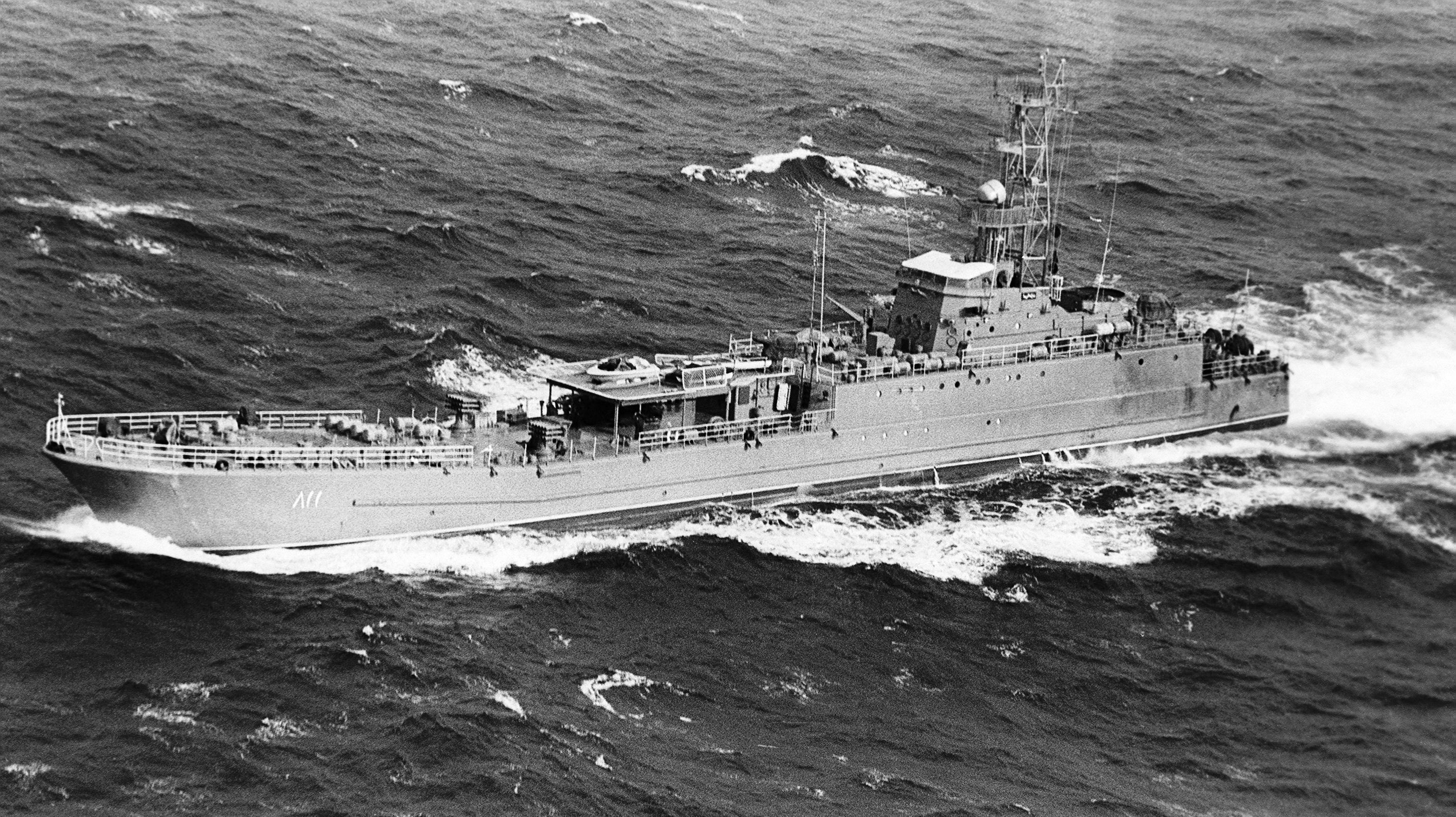
- Polnocny-C

Class overview
- Name: Polnochny
- Builders: Stocznia Północna shipyard at Gdańsk, (Poland), Stocznia Marynarki Wojennej at Gdynia, Poland
- Operators: Algerian National Navy; Azerbaijani Navy; Somali Navy; Syrian Navy; Vietnam People's Navy
- Succeeded by: Ropucha class; Lublin-class minelayer-landing ship
- Subclasses: Polnocny-A (Type 770); Polnocny-B (Type 771); Polnocny-C (Type 773); Modified Polnocny-C (Type 776); Polnocny-D (Type 773U); NS-722; Kumbhir-class tank landing ship
- In commission: 1967
- Completed: 108
- Active: 9

General characteristics
- Type: Landing ship, tank
- Displacement: 834 tons full load (Polnocny-B)
- Length: 73 m (239 ft 6 in)
- Beam: 9.6 m (31 ft 6 in)
- Draught: 2.3 m (7 ft 7 in)
- Propulsion: 2 Soviet Kolomna 40-D two stroke diesels, 2 shafts, 4,400 bhp
- Speed: 18 knots (33 km/h)
- Range: 1,000 nmi (2,000 km) at 18 kn (33 km/h)
- Capacity: 12 BMP-2 4 Main battle tanks 250 tons
- Troops: 250
- Complement: 41
- Armament: Strela 2(SA-N-5) surface-to-air missile system (4 launchers); 30 mm AK-230 air defence gun (2 or 4 twin mounts); 140 mm Ogon 18-barreled rocket launcher(2)

The Polnocny (or Polnochny)-class ships are amphibious warfare vessels. They were designed in Poland, in cooperation with the Soviet Navy and were built in Poland between 1967 and 2002. They now serve in several different navies, and some have been converted to civilian use. The name comes from the Stocznia Północna shipyard (Northern Shipyard) at Gdańsk, where they were built. 107 were built by 1986 (last 16 by Stocznia Marynarki Wojennej (Naval Shipyard) at Gdynia, Poland). In 2002, one ship of a modernised design NS-722 was built in Gdynia for Yemen.

== Characteristics ==
The Polnocny-class ships are classified as medium landing ships in the Russian Navy, and are loosely equivalent to Western tank landing ships. They are equipped with a bow ramp that allows beach landings. The Polnocny-C version can carry 12 BMP-2 armored personnel carriers, or 4 Main Battle Tanks, or 250 infantrymen with their weapons like 82 mm Mortars and ATGMs, or 250 tons of rations & stores. Unlike their Western counterparts, these ships can provide substantial fire support for landed troops with their onboard multiple rocket launchers. Other armament consists of anti-aircraft guns and short-range surface-to-air missiles.

== Variants ==
The Polnocny class comprises several sub-types that vary in size and capacity:

- Polnocny-A (Project 770) (46 built):

Displacement: 800 tons full load
Length: 73 m
Speed: 19 knots (35 km/h)

- Polnocny-B (Project 771) (36 built):

Displacement: 834 tons full load
Length: 73 m
Speed: 18 knots (33 km/h)

- Polnocny-C (Project 773) (24 built)

Displacement: 1150 tons full load
Length: 81.3 m
Speed: 18 knots (33 km/h)

- Modified Polnocny-C (Project 776) Amphibious Assault Command Ship (1 built - ORP Grunwald)

Displacement: 1253 tons full load
Length: 81.3 m
Speed: 18 knots (33 km/h)

- Polnocny-D (Project 773U) (4 built)

Displacement: 1233 tons full load
Length: 81.3 m
Speed: 16 knots (30 km/h)
Aircraft facility: One helicopter platform

- NS-722 class (1 built in 2002)

Displacement: 1,410 tons full load
Length: 88.7 m
Speed: 17 knots (31 km/h)
Aircraft facility: One helicopter platform

== Operational service ==
Built in large quantities, the Polnocny-class ships were once the mainstay of the Soviet amphibious forces, and gave the Soviet naval infantry an effective force projection capability. They were gradually phased out in favour of hovercraft, and few remain active in a number of navies.

=== Current operators ===
Country	Name	Type	
Azerbaijan			
Vietnam			
Ukraine	Yuri Olefirenko	Polnocny-C	Reported sunk 29 May 2023
Syria			
Russia	VTR-140	Polnocny-C	Used as a support dry cargo ship as of 2025

- Algeria − 1 Polnocny-B armed with a twin AK-230 gun as of 2023
- Azerbaijan − 1 Polnocny-A and 1 Polnocny-B as of 2023

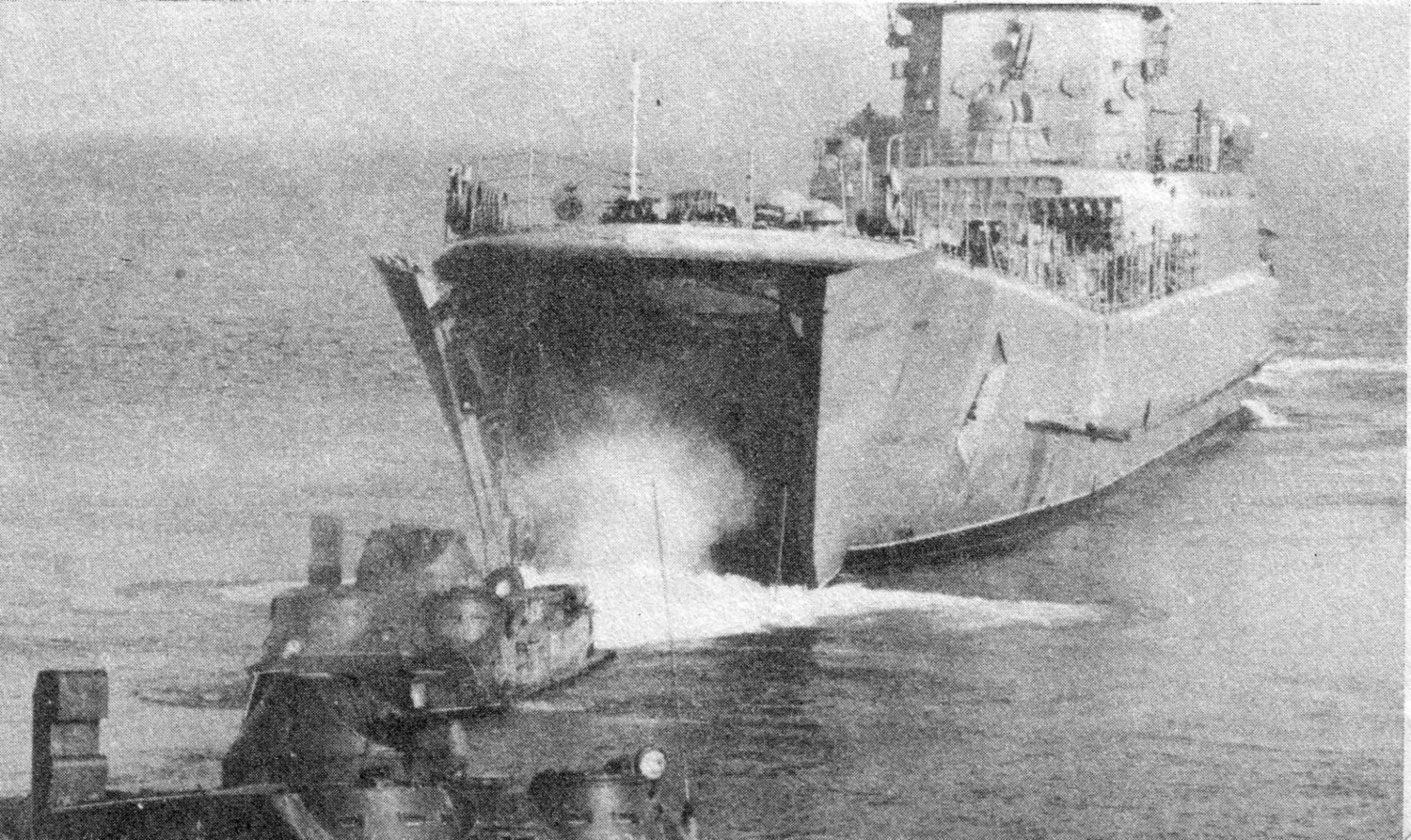
A Polish Polnocny-class vessel unloading armoured personnel carriers.

- Vietnam − 1 Polnocny-A and 2 Polnocny-B as of 2023

=== Potiental operators ===
- Ukraine - 1 Polnocny-C, the Yuri Olefirenko; reported sunk 29 May 2023

=== Former operators ===
- Syria − 3 Polnocny-B as of 2023, destroyed by Israel in 2024 after the fall of the Assad regime
- Angola − Non-operational by 2004
- Bulgaria
- Cuba
- Egypt − 3 Polnocny-A
- Ethiopia
- India − Operated 2 Polnocny-A ships and 8 Polnocny-D (latter operated as Kumbhir-class) from 1966 to 2024
- Indonesia
- Iraq
- Libya − 3 Polnocny-D
- Poland − 1 Polnocny-C was converted into an amphibious command vessel
- Russia − Operated 1 Polnocny-B as a logistic support ship as late as 2004
- Somalia
- Soviet Union − Passed on to successor states
- Ukraine - 1 Polnocny-C, the Yuri Olefirenko, no longer in service as of 2023
- South Yemen − Passed on to the unified Yemeni state
- Yemen − 3 Polnocny-B in poor state by 2004

== See also ==
- List of ships of the Soviet Navy
- List of ships of Russia by project number

Equivalent landing ships of the same era

- BATRAL class
- Type 079
- Kumbhir class

== Bibliography ==
- Moore, Capt. John (1974). Jane's Fighting Ships 1974-75. Jane's Information Group. ISBN 978-0354005067.
- Watts, A.J.(2006); Jane's warship recognition guide; Collins; ISBN 0-06-084992-4
- Jarosław Ciślak; Polska Marynarka Wojenna 1995 (Polish Navy 1995); Lampart, Warsaw 1995; ISBN 978-83-86776-08-5
- Saunders RN, Commodore Stephen, ed. (1 July 2004). Jane's Fighting Ships 2004-2005. Janes Information Group. ISBN 978-0-7106-2623-3.
- International Institute for Strategic Studies (1 January 1989). The Military Balance 1989-1990. Brassey's. ISBN 978-0-08-037569-4.
- International Institute for Strategic Studies (15 February 2023). The Military Balance 2023 (1st ed.). Routledge. pp. 201−204. ISBN 978-1032508955.
