= Shardul-class tank landing ship =

Indian Navy amphibious warfare vessel

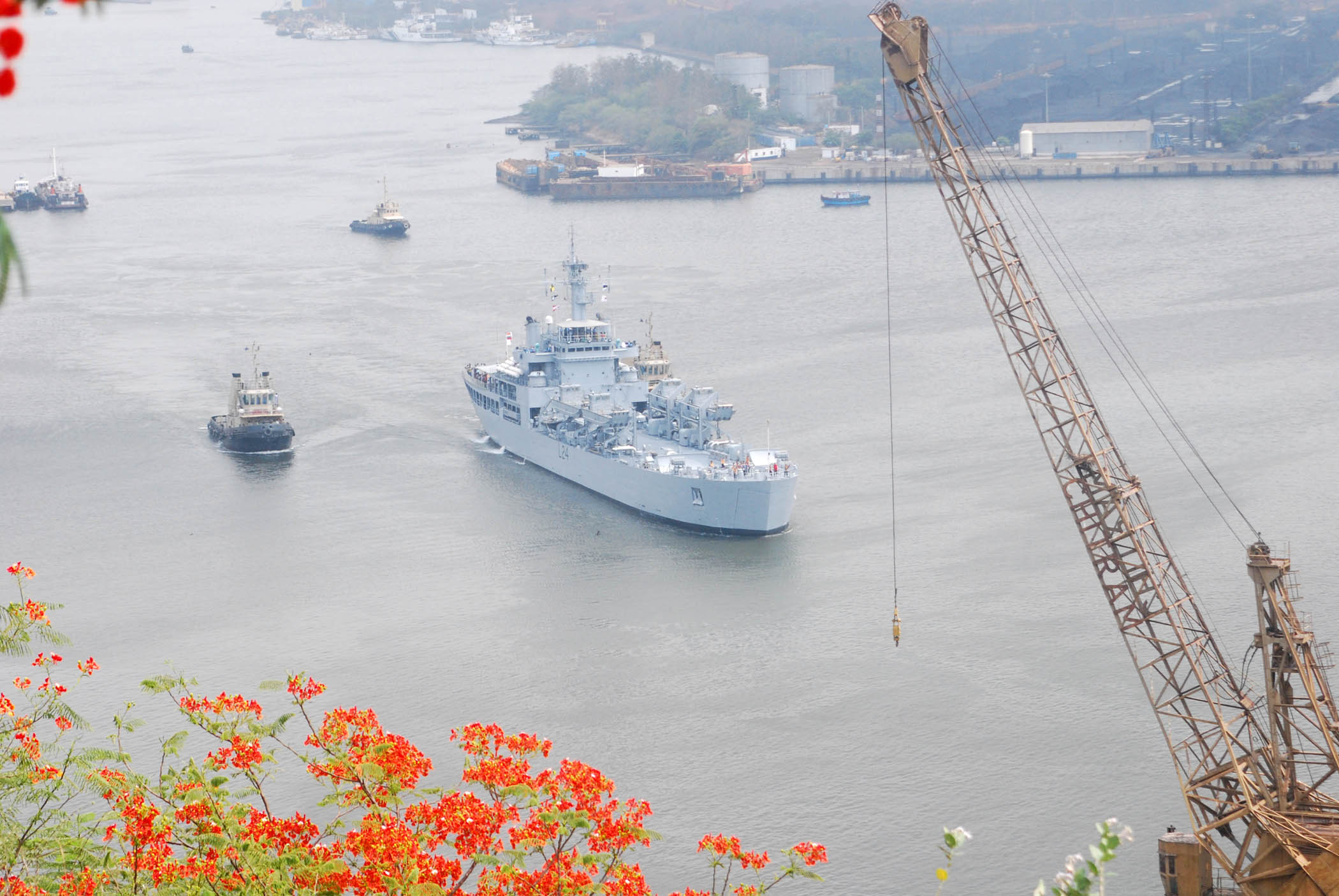
- INS Airavat (L24) sails out of Visakhapatnam harbour after commissioning

Class overview
- Name: Shardul class
- Builders: Garden Reach Shipbuilders and Engineers
- Operators: Indian Navy
- Preceded by: Magar class
- Completed: 3
- Active: 3

General characteristics
- Type: Tank landing ship
- Displacement: 5,650 tons
- Length: 125 m (410 ft)
- Beam: 17.5 m (57 ft)
- Draught: 4 m (13 ft)
- Propulsion: Kirloskar PA6 STC engines
- Speed: 16 kn (30 km/h; 18 mph)
- Boats & landing craft carried: 4 × LCVPs
- Capacity: 11 MBT, 10 armoured vehicles; 465.8 m^{3} (16,450 cu ft) water, 1,292.6 m^{3} (45,650 cu ft) diesel fuel
- Troops: 500
- Complement: 11 officers, 145 sailors
- Electronic warfare & decoys: Decoy: Chaff launchers
- Armament: 2 × WM-18 rocket launchers; 4 × CRN-91 AA (Naval 30 mm Medak) guns, MANPAD's.
- Aircraft carried: 1 Sea King/HAL Dhruv

Shardul-class (lit. 'Tiger') landing ships are large amphibious warfare vessels built by Garden Reach Shipbuilders and Engineers for the Indian Navy. They are an evolution of the Magar-class amphibious landing ships. Initially, the ship was classified as Landing Ship Tank (Large) or LST(L). The class has an indigenous content of over 90%. The ships also carry four landing craft vehicle personnel (LCVP) on board, which can be used for the landing of troops.

== History ==
The order for the vessels were placed in December 2001 while the contract was signed in early 2002.

The ship is equipped with WM-18 140 mm rocket launchers, developed by DRDO and manufactured by Larsen & Toubro. Two units of the system is integrated with one each on port and starboard. The rocket launcher has 18 tubes in a configuration of 6×3. These are used for beach clearing operations before initiating amphibious operations. The armament also includes four CRN-91 autocannons for self-defence.

Shardul was the first vessel commissioned at Karwar Naval Base, INS Kadamba. The second ship Kesari was commissioned at the Visakhapatnam Naval Base, and later moved to Port Blair. The third ship Airavata underwent sea trials in 2008 and was commissioned in 2009.

== Ships ==
Name	Pennant Number	Laid down	Launched	Commissioned	Status
Indian Navy
Shardul	L16	16 December 2002	3 April 2004	4 January 2007	Active
Kesari	L15		8 June 2005	5 April 2008	Active
Airavat	L24		27 March 2006	19 May 2009	Active

== Gallery ==
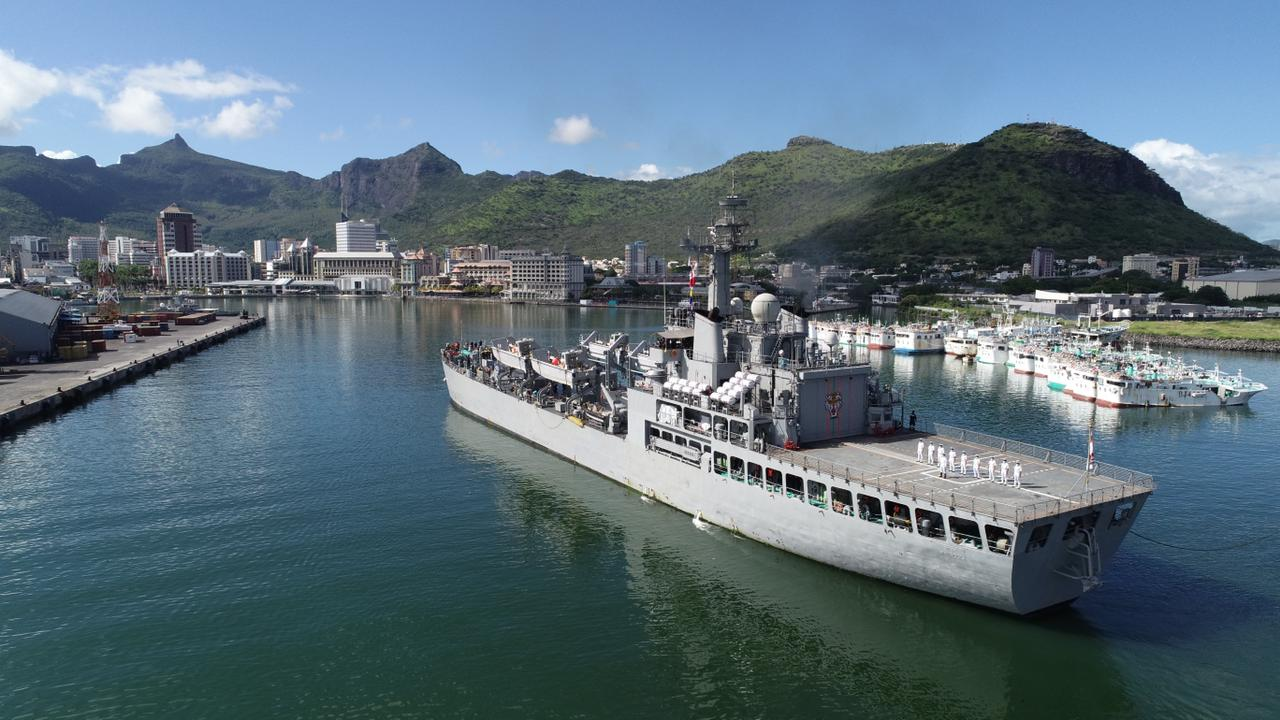
Shardul entering Port Louis, Mauritius.

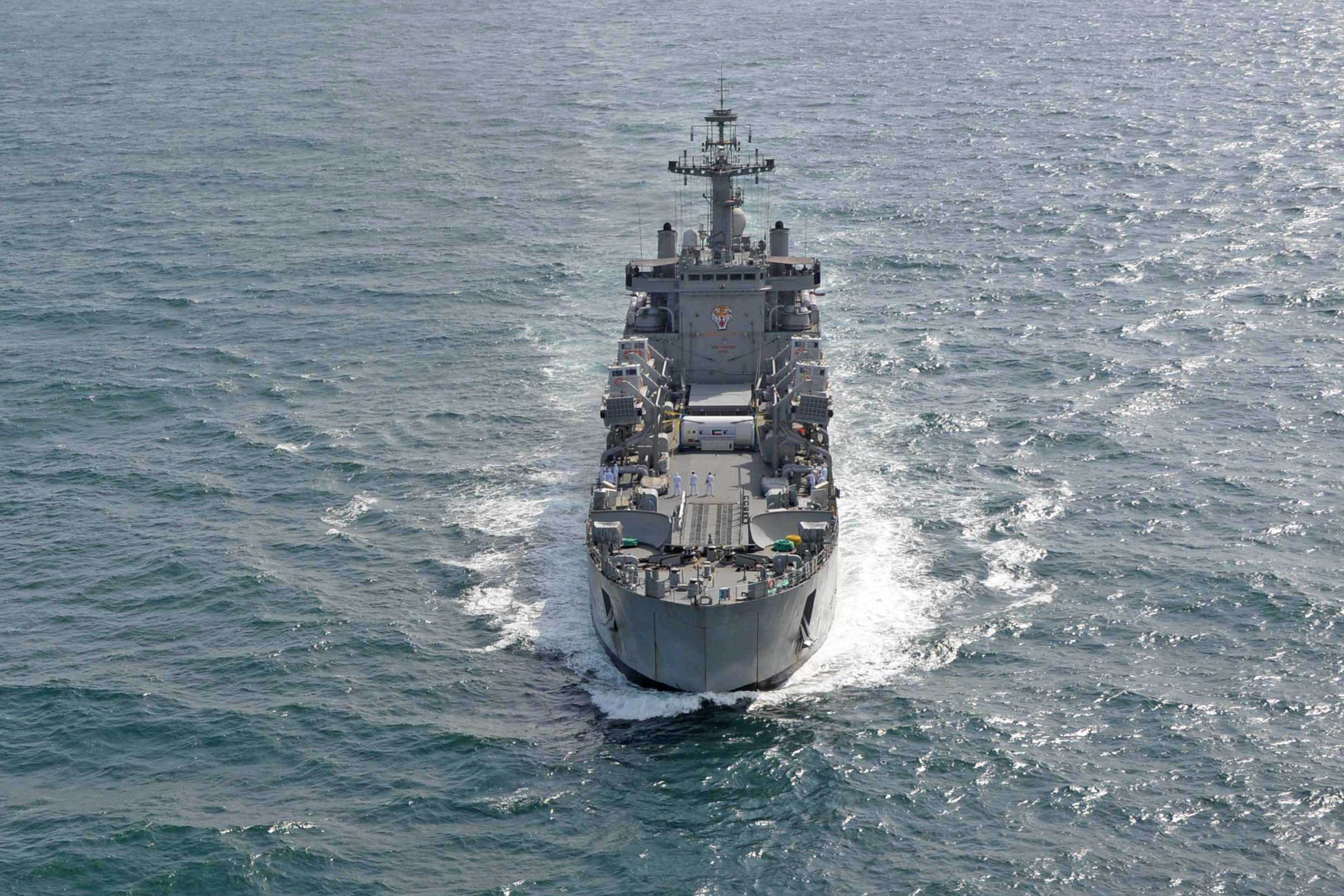
Shardul of 1st Training squadron en-route to Sri Lanka.

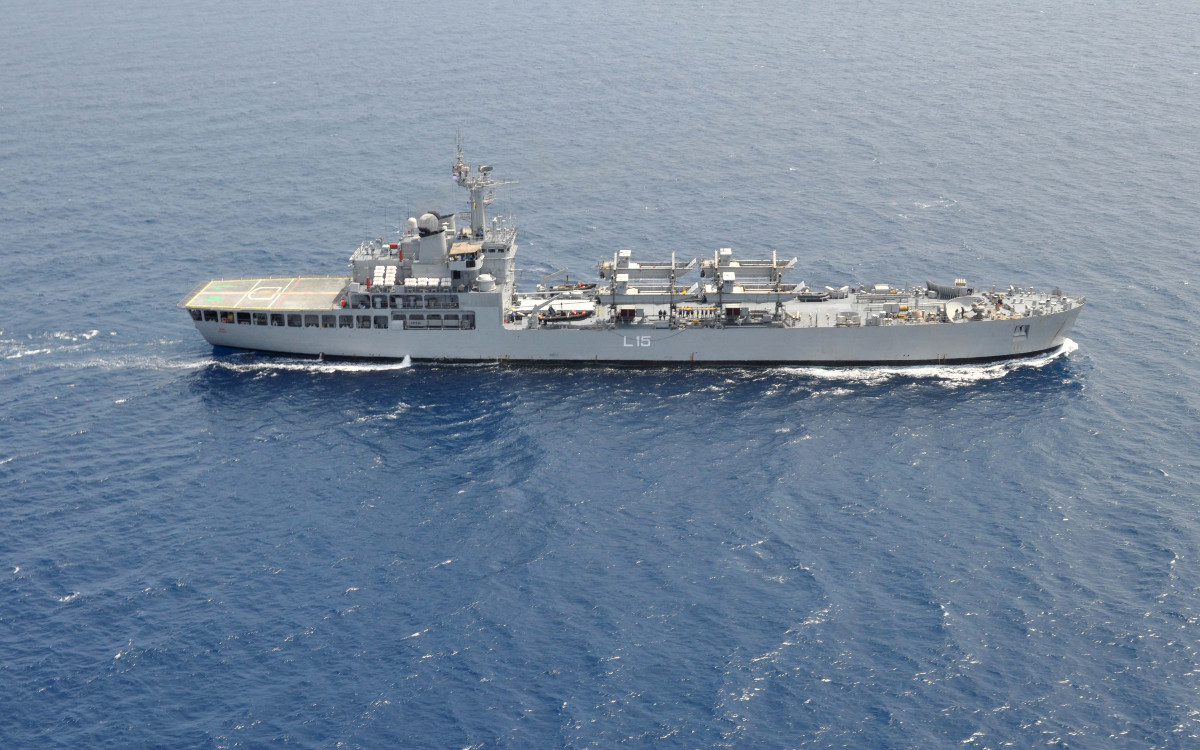
Kesari during MILAN 2018 exercise.

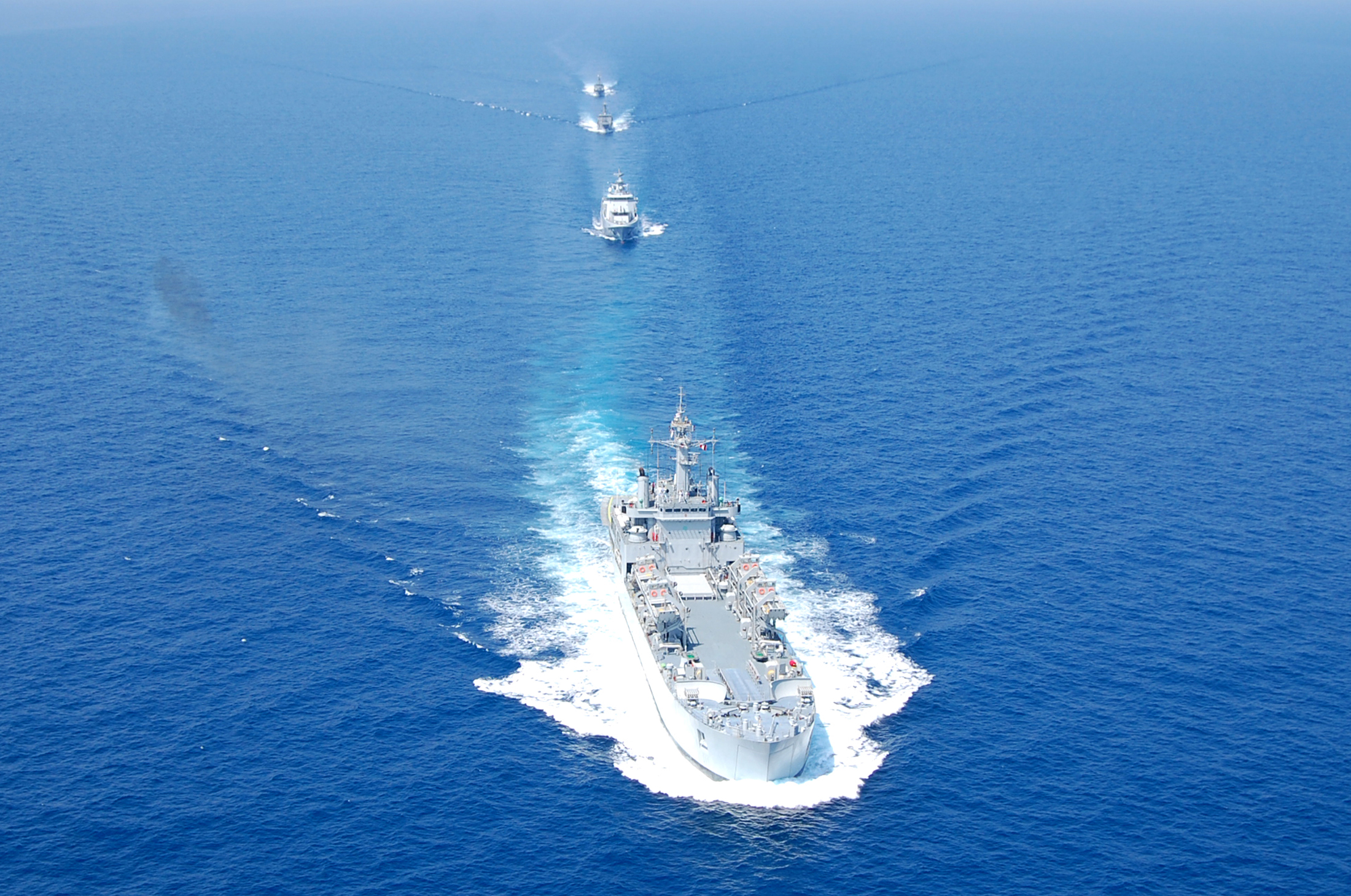
Kesari participating in PASSEX during MILAN 2012.

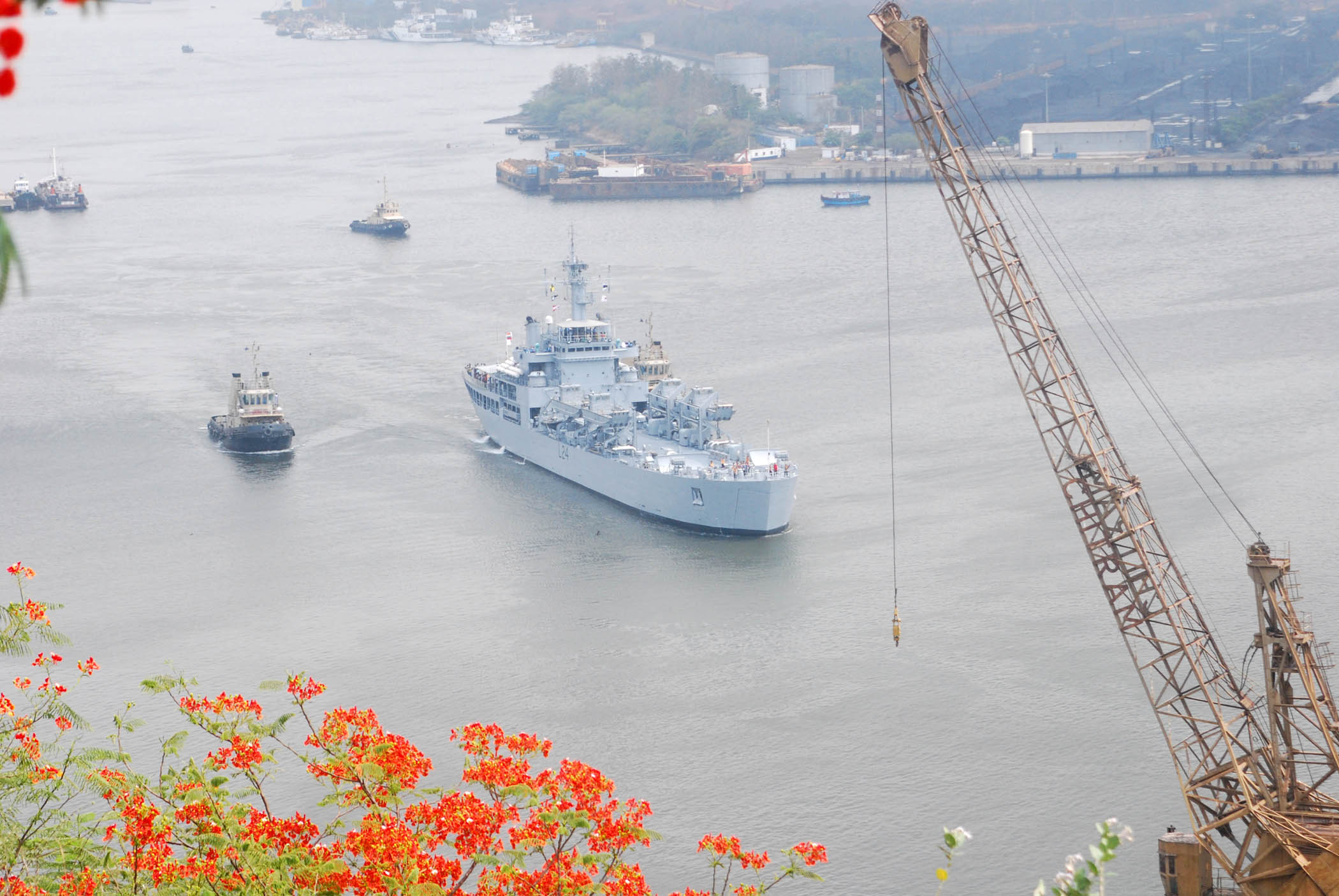
Airavat sails out of Visakhapatnam harbor after commissioning on May 19, 2009.

== See also ==
- List of active Indian Navy ships

Equivalent landing ships of the same era

- Type 072A
- Go Jun Bong class
