= INS Kesari (2005) =

Shardul-class tank landing ship of the Indian Navy

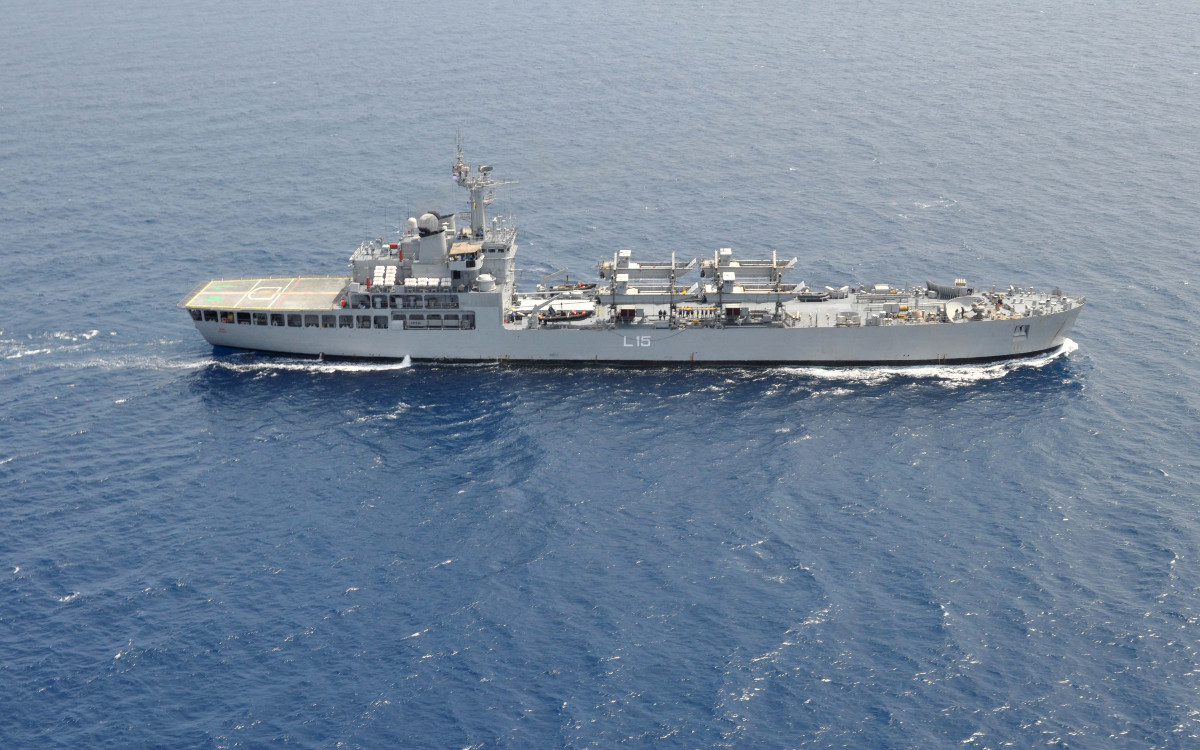
- INS Kesari (L15) during Milan 2018 exercise

History

India
- Name: INS Kesari
- Namesake: Gir lion
- Builder: Garden Reach Shipbuilders and Engineers
- Launched: 8 June 2005
- Commissioned: 5 April 2008
- Identification: Pennant number: L15; MMSI number: 419600001; Callsign: AUKU
- Status: Active

General characteristics
- Class & type: Shardul-class tank landing ship
- Displacement: 5650 tons
- Length: 125 m (410 ft)
- Beam: 17.5 m (57 ft)
- Draught: 4 m (13 ft)
- Propulsion: Kirloskar PA6 STC engines
- Speed: 16 kn (30 km/h; 18 mph)
- Capacity: 11 MBT, 10 vehicles; 465.8 m^{3} (16,450 cu ft) water, 1,292.6 m^{3} (45,650 cu ft) diesel fuel
- Troops: 500
- Complement: 11 officers, 145 sailors
- Electronic warfare & decoys: Chaff launchers
- Armament: 2 × WM-18 rocket launchers; 4 × CRN-91 AA (Naval 30mm Medak) guns, MANPAD's.
- Aircraft carried: 1 Westland Sea King or HAL Dhruv

INS Kesari (L15) (lit. 'Lion') is a Shardul-class tank landing ship of the Indian Navy.

== History ==
The ship was launched by Sandhya Prasad, wife of the then Vice Chief of Naval Staff, Vice Admiral Yashwant Prasad.

In 2009, INS Kesari was transferred from the Eastern Naval Command in Vishakhapatnam to Port Blair, Andaman and Nicobar Command.

In March 2014, the ship, under the command of Commander Mahesh Mangipudi, was involved in the hunt for Malaysia Airlines Flight 370 in the Indian Ocean region.

In January 2022, two Solas Marine fast interceptor boat were transferred from Indian Navy to Mozambique Navy on board INS Kesari. Mozambique Navy personnel were given training to operate the new interceptor boats.

An incident of water ingress was reported in a compartment of the ship below the waterline on 31 October 2026 while the ship was berthed at the Naval Dockyard (Visakhapatnam). The naval personnel had immediately activated emergency protocol following the detection. Thereafter, high-capacity de-watering equipment and specialised salvage teams were deployed by the naval authorities to combat the situation and ensure the safety of all the personnel on board. There were no casualties in the incident. Technical teams from the dockyard are analysing hull fittings and sea-suction valves of the vessel for a technical document to pinpoint the point of ingression. A Board of Inquiry will also be constituted to examine the cause of the incident.
