= LCVP (United Kingdom) =

United Kingdom landing craft

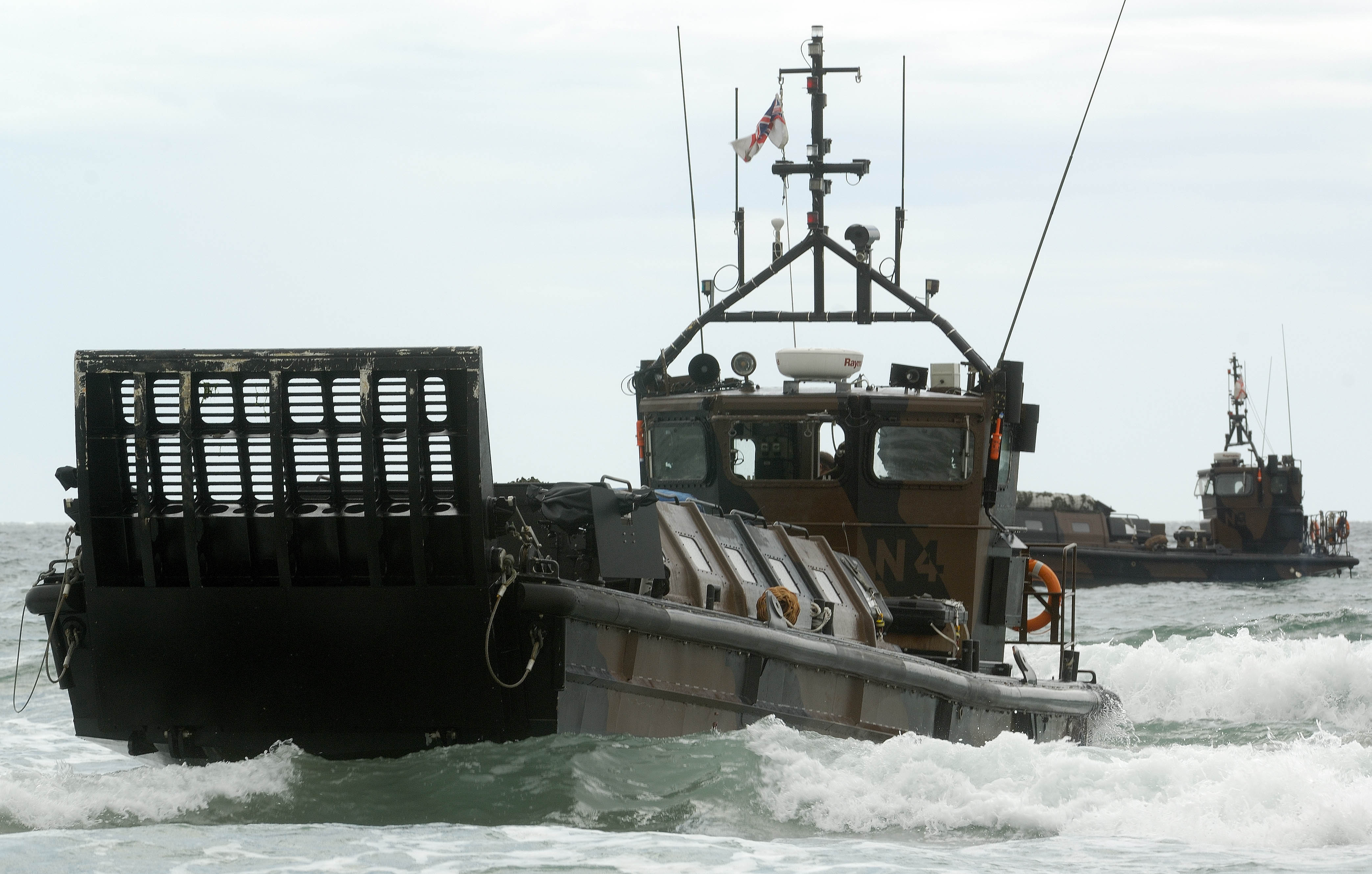
A Royal Marines Landing Craft Vehicle Personnel (LCVP) Mk5

The Landing Craft Vehicle Personnel (LCVP) is a versatile amphibious landing craft designed to transport troops or armoured vehicles from ship to shore during amphibious landings. The designation was first used in British service for the LCVP Mk2s introduced with the two Fearless-class amphibious transport docks, the role having previously been carried out by the Landing Craft Assault developed during the Second World War. They are manned and operated by 1 Assault Group Royal Marines.

== LCVP Mk2 ==
The LCVP Mk2 was built by the Dorset Yacht Company at Poole during the 1960s. The craft was powered by two Foden diesel engines and could carry 35 fully equipped Royal Marines Commandos or two Land Rovers. Foxtrot 7, one of four carried by HMS Fearless, rescued 41 crew members from the burning HMS Antelope on 24 May 1982 during the Falklands War. It is preserved ashore at the Royal Marines Museum, Portsmouth. Foxtrot 8 is located in Boathouse 4 of the Portsmouth Historic Dockyard who in November 2015 were awarded funding to restore her back to sea-going condition. Tango 5, one of HMS Intrepid's LCVPs, is currently the "Gate Guardian" at RM Chivenor.

The LCVP Mk2 is no longer in service.

== LCVP Mk4 ==
The LCVP Mk4 came into service in 1986 replacing the older LCVP Mk2. Throughout their service they were mostly used in independent Royal Marine amphibious formations. They had a draught of 75 centimetres (30 in) at the stern and were powered by twin Perkins 6-cylinder turbo diesel engines. Four were used by the British Army's Royal Logistic Corps.

As of 2012, the LCVP Mk4 has been withdrawn from service.

== LCVP Mk5 ==
The LCVP Mk5 was built by Vosper Thornycroft and FBM Babcock Marine, with the first entering service in 1996. They represent a significant improvement in capability over the preceding Mk4s. Four Mk5s together can transport a full Royal Marine company (around 140 troops). The Mk5s operate from the amphibious warfare ships HMS Albion and HMS Bulwark.

In 2012, a total of 23 Mk5s were in service with pennants 9473, 9673 to 9676 and 9707 to 9724. By 2014 LCVPs 9473, 9673, 9674 and 9708 had been withdrawn from service. In 2023 it was reported that eight Mk5Bs remained in service.

In 2023 it was reported that the Royal Navy and Marines were seeking a replacement for the LCVP Mk 5 with the objective of securing service entry by 2027. The new Commando Insertion Craft were to have a low signature and be able to carry a strike team and small vehicle over a distance of 150 miles (240 km) at a speed of 25 knots (46 km/h; 29 mph). A production contract was reportedly envisaged by 2025, though this objective was subsequently missed. In June 2026, the Government announced that new high-speed "Joint Commando Craft" were to be acquired for the Royal Marines together with "drone and autonomous technology". However, the precise timing of the acquisition remained unclear.

=== Specifications ===
The LCVP Mk5 has the following specifications:

- Weight (full): 24,000 kg (24 t; 24 long tons)
- Length: 15.7 m (51 ft 6 in)
- Width : 4.3 m (14 ft 1 in)
- Speed (full): 25 knots (46 km/h; 29 mph)
- Endurance: In excess of 210 nmi (390 km; 240 mi)
- Troops: 38 Royal Marines (3 crew, 35 fully equipped troops)
- Cost: £1,000,000

== See also ==
- List of active Royal Marines military watercraft
