= Stocznia Gdynia =

Shipyard in Poland

Stocznia Gdynia S.A.
- Company type: Spółka akcyjna
- Industry: Shipbuilding
- Founded: 1922
- Defunct: 2009
- Headquarters: Gdynia, Poland
- Key people: Patryk Michalak, Chairman
- Services: Shipbuilding; Ship repair
- Website: www.stocznia.gdynia.pl

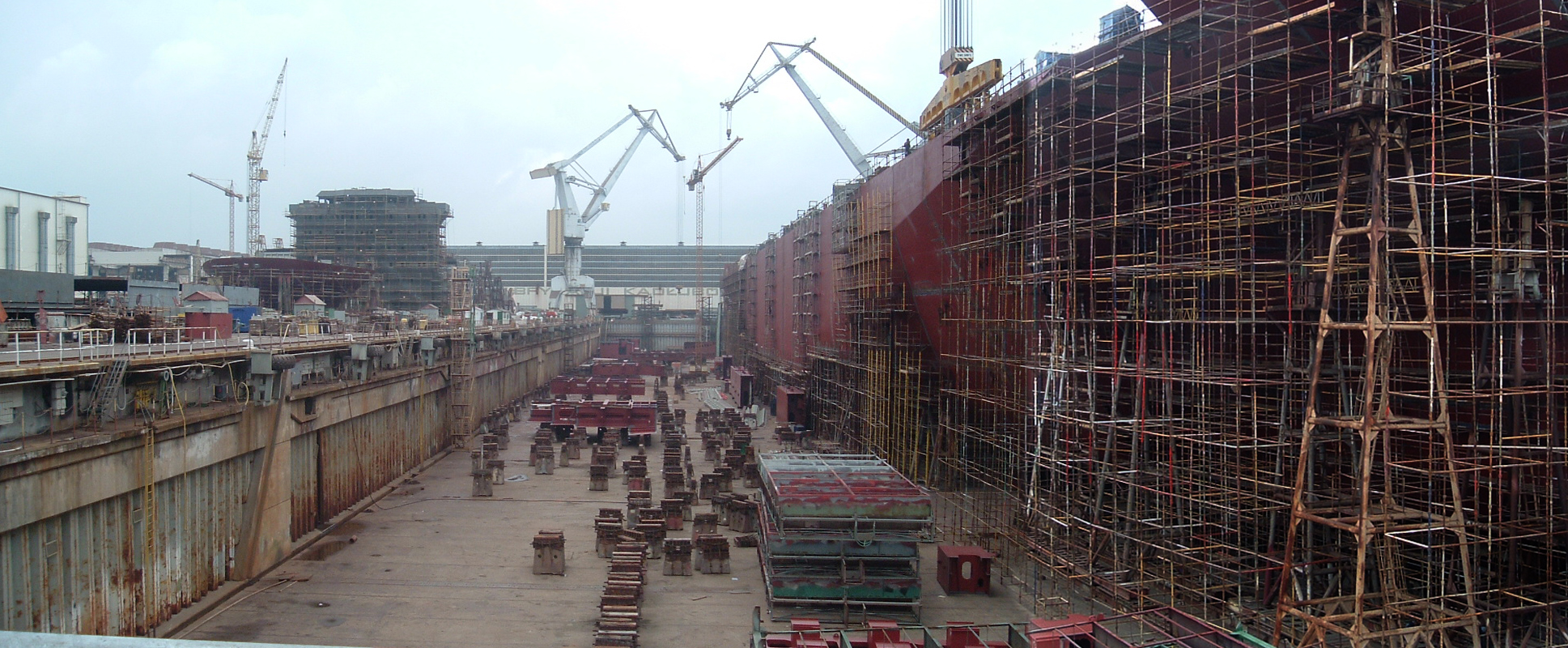
Gdynia Shipyard

Stocznia Gdynia was a shipyard located in the Port of Gdynia, Poland. It was founded in 1922. It has been in liquidation since 2009 and does not conduct production activities.

In 1970, workers of Gdynia Shipyard rose up against the ruling Polish Communist Party. About 20 people died fighting with army and police in the streets of Gdynia during the Polish 1970 protests. That had a great influence on creating the Solidarity movement in 1980. In 1998 it bought the Gdańsk Shipyard. The current name is Stocznia Gdynia S.A.

== History ==
The shipyard was founded in 1922, initially building small coastal vessels. The construction of its first large ship, SS Olza, was interrupted by the outbreak of World War II.

During the German occupation, the shipyard was taken over by Deutsche Werke company and used to repair warships. Later in the war it built sections of Type XXI U-boats.

After sustaining bombing damage during World War II the shipyard was rebuilt and expanded. In 1963, its first dry dock was finished, with dimensions 240 × 40 m. A second drydock with dimensions 380 × 70 m was finished in 1976.

In 2000 and 2001, the shipyard received six ship-building orders from Gearbulk Holdings Ltd., three of which were not subsequently fulfilled. The contracts included provision for repayments in the event of each contract being terminated, but a legal dispute arose between Stocznia Gdynia and Gearbulk which centred on whether a purchaser can rely on repayment provisions within a contract at the same time as accepting the repudiation of the contract.

== Liquidation ==
Since March 2009, according to the so-called law "specustawa stoczniowa" was started the process of compensation Gdynia Shipyard, which meant the elimination of legal terms, the total sale of assets yard in the open tender and redundancies involving all employees. The money from the sale will be given to the repayment of the yard's creditors - public and private, and the obligations of public law, including ZUS.

The last launch took place on 25 April 2009, and the dismissal of employees was conducted at the end of May 2009.

=== Investors ===
In May 2009, the Stichting Particulier Fonds Greenrights bought key assets of the shipyards of Gdynia and Szczecin, and on 17 June received guarantees of the Arab Bank, Qatar Islamic Bank. The investor had to pay for the assets of Gdynia Shipyard more than 287 million PLN. On 25 June 2009 the Ministry of Internal Affairs and Administration issued a formal agreement on the sale of assets of Stocznia Gdynia SA, necessary for entities outside the European Economic Area. Polish Shipyards Company was registered by the Warsaw court on 21 July. Its share capital amounted to 100 000 zł.
