= Gdańsk Shipyard =

Historic shipyard in Gdańsk, Poland

Coordinates: 54.37623°N 18.64877°E

Gdańsk Shipyard SA Stocznia Gdańsk S.A.

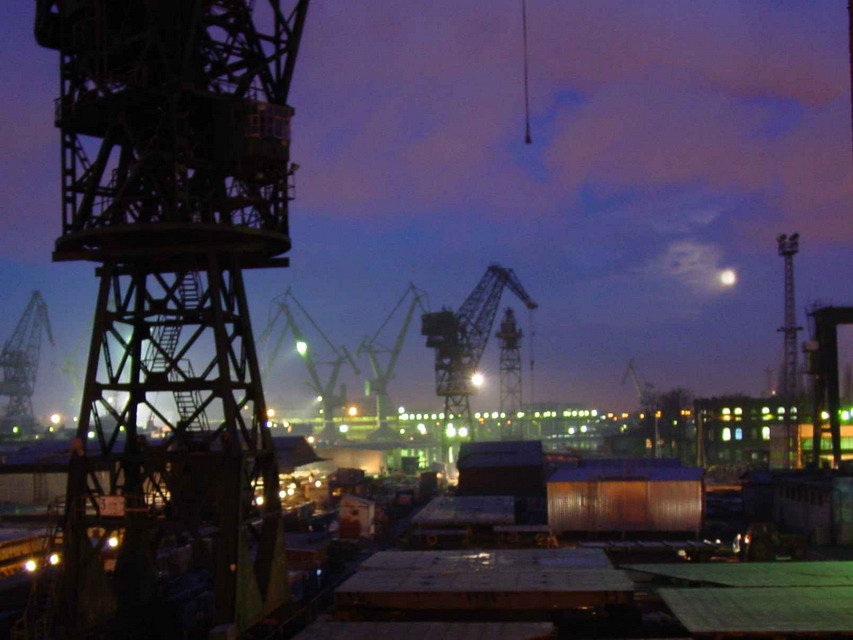
- Type: Spółka akcyjna
- Industry: Shipbuilding
- Founded: 1945
- Headquarters: Gdańsk, Poland
- Key people: Andrzej Stokłosa, Chairman
- Parent: Gdansk Shipyard Group (75%)
- Website: gdanskshipyard.pl

The Gdańsk Shipyard (Polish: Stocznia Gdańska, formerly Lenin Shipyard) is a large Polish shipyard, located in the city of Gdańsk, northern Poland. The yard gained international fame when Polish trade union Solidarity (Solidarność) was founded there in September 1980. It is situated on the western side of Martwa Wisła and on Ostrów Island.

== History ==
Gdańsk Shipyard was founded in 1946 as a state-owned company, on sites of the former German shipyards, Schichau-Werft and Danziger Werft, both considerably damaged in the Second World War. On 1 July 1952, a state-owned enterprise called Baza Remontowa-Ostrow was established on Ostrów Island. The name changed to Gdańska Stocznia Remontowa later in the year. During the time of the People's Republic of Poland, the complex was known as the Gdańsk Shipyard and Vladimir Lenin Shipyard in Gdańsk (1967–89).

The Northern Shipyard (Stocznia Północna) was also formed in June 1945, when it was known as Shipyard No. 3. Its activities were mainly production and repairs of trains, trams and small floating units. In December 1945, Shipyard No. 3 had a workforce of 694, including 8 engineers and 28 technicians. Launches began in 1948 – smacks for the Gdańsk Institute of Sea Fishing were delivered and 53 rescue boats were built. In 1949 the shipyard started to produce fishing lugo-trawlers.

In February 1950, Shipyard No. 3 changed its name to Northern Shipyard. In 1951, it ended production of trains, specializing instead in small cargo ships, fishing vessels and scientific ships. In 1952, the shipyard delivered 14 vessels. After 1955, the shipyard built vessels for the navies of Poland, USSR, Bulgaria, Yugoslavia and East Germany – mainly for troop landing craft, hydrographic, rescue, training and torpedo boats. In 1975 the shipyard was named "Westerplatte Heroes".

In 1980, Gdańsk was the arena for events that marked the beginning of organized resistance to Communist dictatorship in eastern Europe. A strike by 17,000 ship builders saw Solidarity (Solidarność), led by shipyard electrician Lech Wałęsa, recognised as the first non-Communist trade union in the then Soviet Bloc. The move was one of the first successful steps in a campaign of civil resistance that contributed to the eventual collapse of Communism across eastern Europe.

Through the 1980s, Northern Shipyard continued to produce super-trawlers, super-seiners, hydrographic units and troop landing craft for the Soviet Union – the last four were delivered in 1991. Contracts signed with the Communist-era Polish Navy were delivered in the early 1990s. Difficulties on the world market forced radical changes and the yard began to specialize in cargo containers, mainly for Germany and Nigeria.

In 1990, the state-owned Stocznia Gdańska became a joint stock company with 61% in National Treasury shares and 31% owned by employees. Since then, Gdańsk Shipyard has operated as Stocznia Gdańsk S.A. On 1 April 1993, Northern Shipyard of "Westerplatte Heroes" became a corporation, under the name Northern Shipyard S.A. In the late 1990s, the shipyard produced ferries, fishing vessels, tugboats and ships for the offshore industry. Since June 2003, the main shareholder has been Gdańsk "Repair" Shipyard. Industrial Union of Donbas obtained 75% shares of the shipyard through privatisation in 2007, with the remaining share held by the Polish government. The Polish government regained shares of the shipyard from IDS in 2018 reaching 50%.

As part of the Repair Group, Northern Shipyard can offer highly technical specialized products – from design to a fully-equipped ship. The shipyard now produces specialist ships, including LNG/LPG transport ships, passenger-car ferries, container vessels, offshore boats, hydrographic, and scientific ships. These vessels sail under the flags of Denmark, Finland, Germany, Norway, the UK, USA, and Poland.

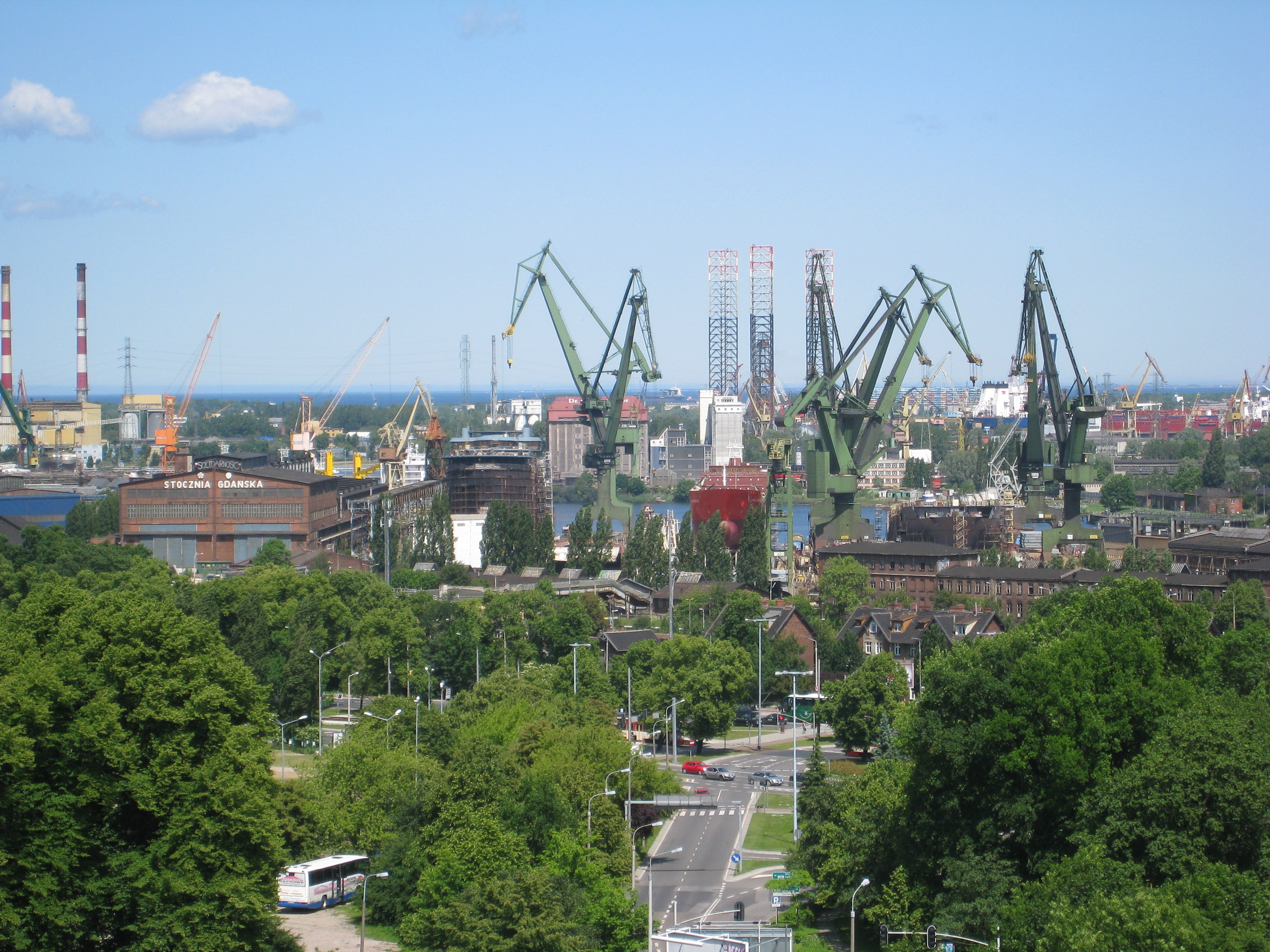
A view of the shipyard in 2009

Over 60 years, Stocznia Gdańsk has delivered more than 1,000 seagoing ships to owners all over the world. In recent years, the top deliveries have been container ships, reefers, bulk carriers and passenger ro-ro ferries. Most ships are designed in their own design office. Design and construction of ships has remained the main activity of the yard. Work for the offshore industry began in the 21st century.

Gdańsk shipyards have fallen on hard times. Once a place of work for over 20,000 people, the Gdańsk shipyards employ 2,200 workers today. The European Union has backed a restructuring plan for the shipyard.

About 77 companies operate on the grounds of the shipyards, including GSG Towers, which builds steel towers for wind turbines.

The shipyard's Gate Number Two, for decades the focus of strikes and celebrations, has become a pilgrimage destination.

== Concerts ==
In 2005, French electronic music composer Jean Michel Jarre performed a multimedia concert at the shipyard to celebrate the 25th anniversary of the Solidarity movement. The concert was a one-off event, attracting 170,000 spectators on site, over 6 million television viewers and resulted in the release of the Live from Gdańsk (2005) album.

David Gilmour, guitarist for Pink Floyd played a concert at the shipyard in 2006 to celebrate the anniversary of the Polish revolution as part of the Solidarity movement. The concert, which attracted 50,000 spectators, closed his 2006 world tour in support of On an Island (2006) and is documented on the Live in Gdańsk (2008) album.

== Arson attack ==
On 24 November 1994, during a concert by the band Golden Life in the Gdansk Shipyard Hall, a fire occurred which led to the death of 7 people. The cause of the fire was arson, but the perpetrator was never identified.

== Gallery ==
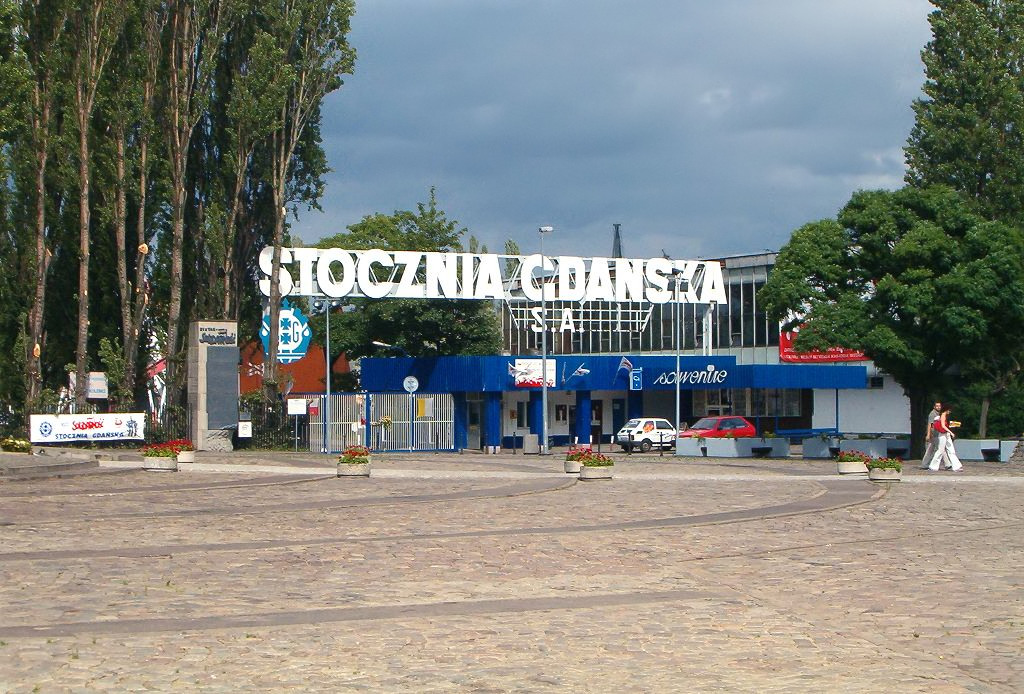
Entrance

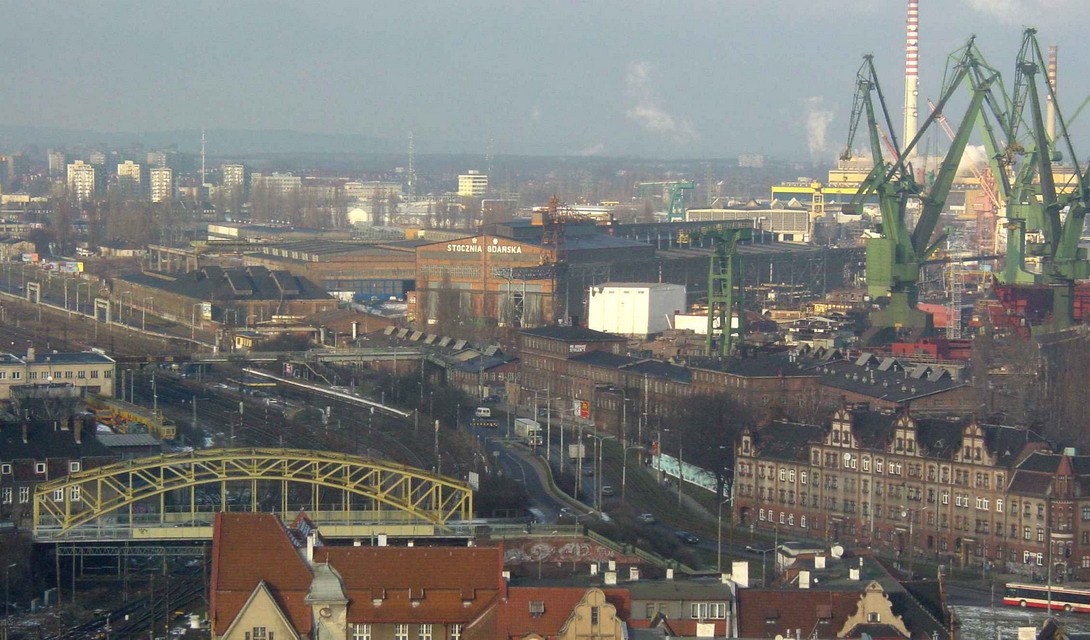
Gdańsk Shipyard, the birthplace of Solidarity

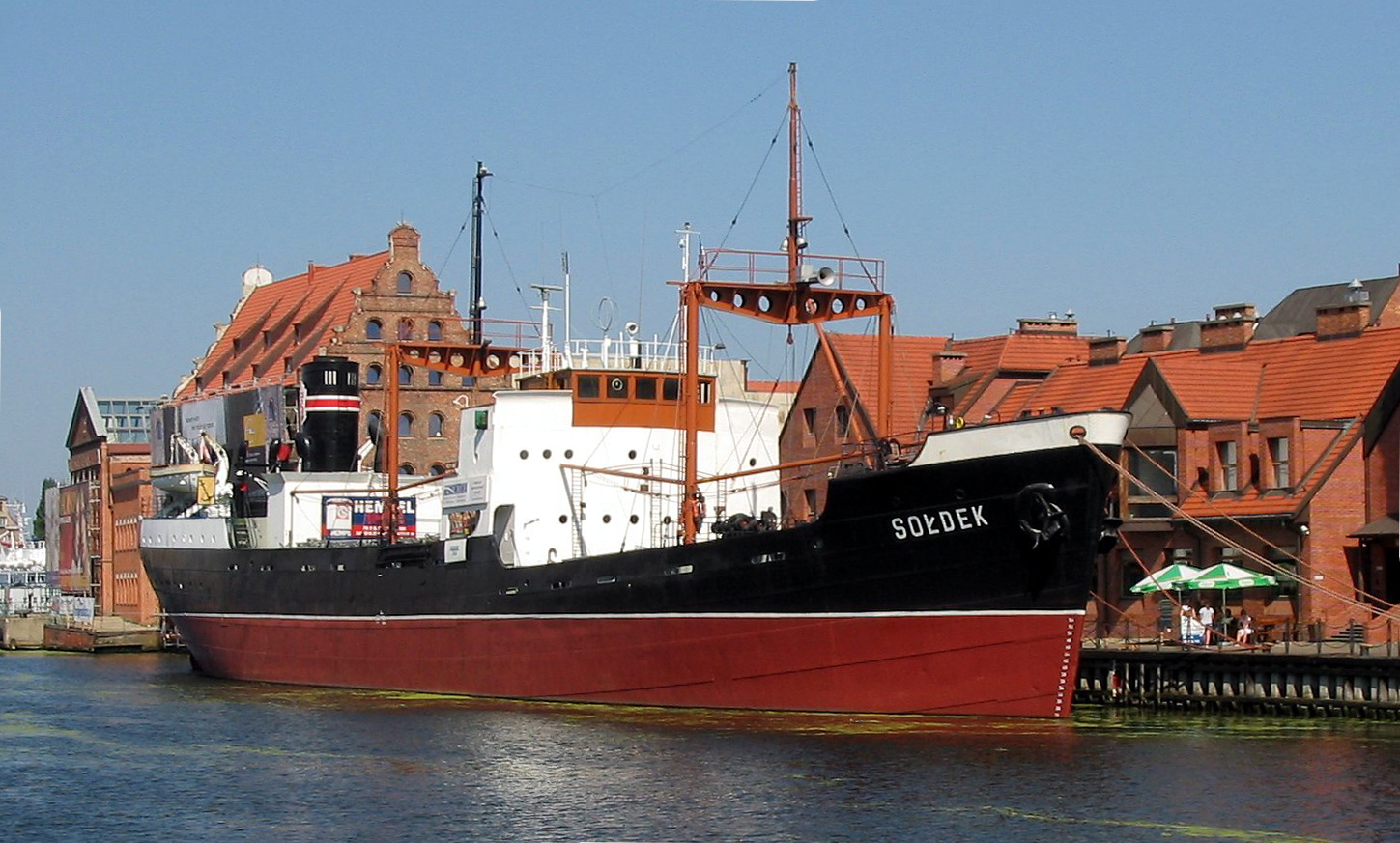
SS Sołdek – museum ship, 2004

== See also ==
- Civil resistance
- World Federation of Democratic Youth
- Lech Wałęsa
- Monument to fallen Shipyard Workers
- Solidarity (Polish trade union)
- Remontowa
- Krystyna Chojnowska-Liskiewicz
