= LST Mk.1 =

Series of Landing Ship, Tank in WW II

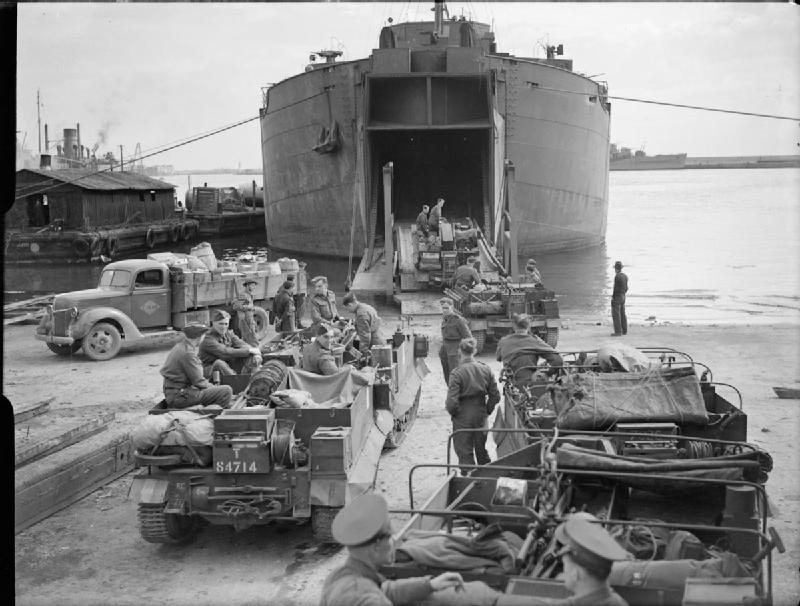
- HMS Bachaquero Universal Carriers being loaded at Bone Harbour through the bow doors of HMS Bachaquero

Class overview
- Name: LST Maracaibo class
- Builders: Furness Shipbuilding Company, Haverton Hill-on-Tees
- Operators: Royal Navy
- Succeeded by: Boxer
- Completed: 3 (Misoa, Tasajera & Bachaquero)

General characteristics
- Tonnage: 4890 GRT
- Length: 382 ft (116 m)
- Beam: 64 ft (19.5m)
- Draught: Fully laden: 15 ft (4.6 m) aft; 4 ft (1.2 m) forward
- Ramps: Double hinged ramp, effective length of 100 ft (30 m)
- Propulsion: Reciprocating steam engine, 2 shafts, 3,000 shp
- Capacity: 18 × 30 ton tanks or 22 × 25 ton tanks or 33 × 3-ton trucks
- Troops: Berths for 217 troops
- Complement: 98 Combined Operations personnel
- Armament: 1 × twin 40 mm gun; 6 × 20 mm guns; 3 × Lewis guns; 2 × 4 in (100 mm) smoke mortars
- Notes: Equipment: 2 × 50 ton derrick cranes

LST Mk.1 is a series of Landing Ship, Tank used during the World War II.

== Maracaibo landing ships ==
The British evacuation from Dunkirk in 1940 demonstrated to the Admiralty that the Allies needed relatively large, ocean-going ships that could handle shore-to-shore delivery of tanks and other vehicles in amphibious assaults upon the continent of Europe. As an interim measure, three 4,000 to 4,800-gross register ton "Lake tankers", built to pass over the restrictive bars of Lake Maracaibo, Venezuela, were selected for conversion because of their shallow draft. Bow doors and ramps were added to these ships, which became the first tank landing ships, LST (1): HMS Misoa, Tasajera and Bachaquero. They later proved their worth during the invasion of Algeria in 1942, but their bluff bows made for inadequate speed and pointed out the need for an all-new design incorporating a sleeker hull.

== Boxer class ==
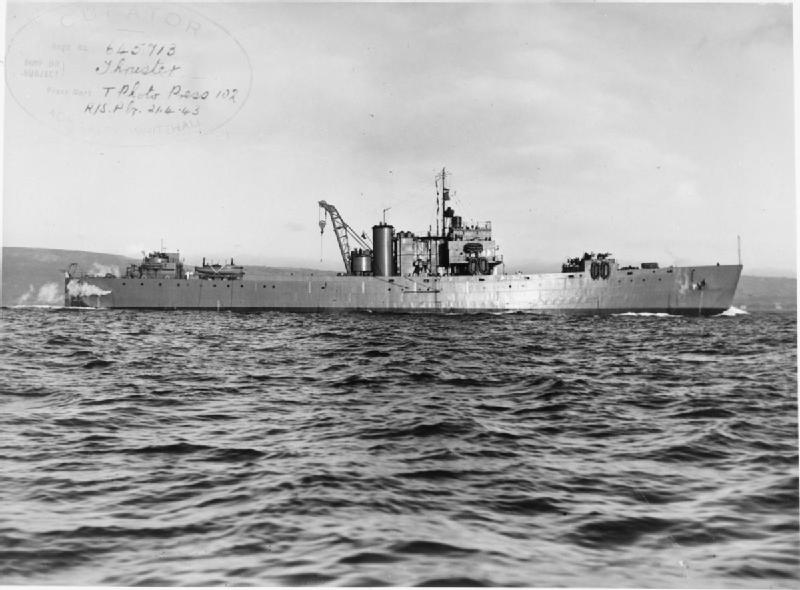
- HMS Thruster

Class overview
- Name: LST (1) Boxer class
- Builders: Harland and Wolff
- Operators: Royal Navy
- Preceded by: Maracaibo
- Succeeded by: LST (2)
- Completed: 3 (Boxer, Bruiser, Thruster)

General characteristics
- Type: Landing Ship, Tank Mark I
- Displacement: 3,620 long tons (3,678 t) standard; 5,410 long tons (5,497 t) full load
- Length: 400 ft (120 m)
- Beam: 49 ft (15 m)
- Draught: 14 ft 6 in (4.42 m)
- Propulsion: Steam turbines, 2 shafts, 7,000 shp (5,200 kW)
- Speed: 18 knots (33 km/h; 21 mph) laden to beaching draught; 16.5 knots (30.6 km/h; 19.0 mph) at deep
- Range: 9,000 nmi (17,000 km; 10,000 mi) at 14 kn (26 km/h; 16 mph)
- Capacity: 13 Churchill tanks or 20 medium tanks, 27 vehicles on upper deck, 193 men
- Complement: 169
- Armament: 4 × QF 2 pdr; 8 × 20 mm Oerlikon; 2 × 4-inch smoke mortars
- Notes: Equipment: 1 × 40 ton crane

The Boxer class was the first purpose-built LST design. This work was started before any of the converted Maracaibo class were in service, so there was no opportunity to learn from the effectiveness of that design. The urgency in building the Boxers was that the Maracaibos were considered to be too slow for operational requirements. As events turned out, the LST(2) had the same slow speed of 10 knots (19 km/h; 12 mph), but given the much larger numbers of the LST(2), that had to be accepted.

The Boxer class was a scaled-down design from ideas penned by Prime Minister Winston Churchill. In order that it could carry 13 Churchill infantry tanks, 27 other vehicles and nearly 200 men (in addition to the crew) at a speed of 18 knots (33 km/h; 21 mph), it could not have a shallow draught sufficient for easy unloading. As a result, each of the three (Boxer, Bruiser, and Thruster) ordered in March 1941 had a very long ramp stowed behind the bow doors.

The ships were built at Harland and Wolff from 1941 and the first completed early in 1943. Work was delayed by the complexities of an entirely new type of design and German air raids on Belfast. Bruiser and Thruster took part in the Salerno landings. Later all three were intended to be converted to fighter direction ships in order to have ground-controlled interception of enemy aircraft during landing operations but only Boxer was converted and it took part in the Normandy landings.

The U.S. were to build seven LST (1) but in light of the problems with the design and progress with the LST Mark II the plans were cancelled. Construction of the LST (1)s took until 1943 and the first US LST (2) was launched before them.
