= Amphibious warfare ship =

Ship used in amphibious warfare

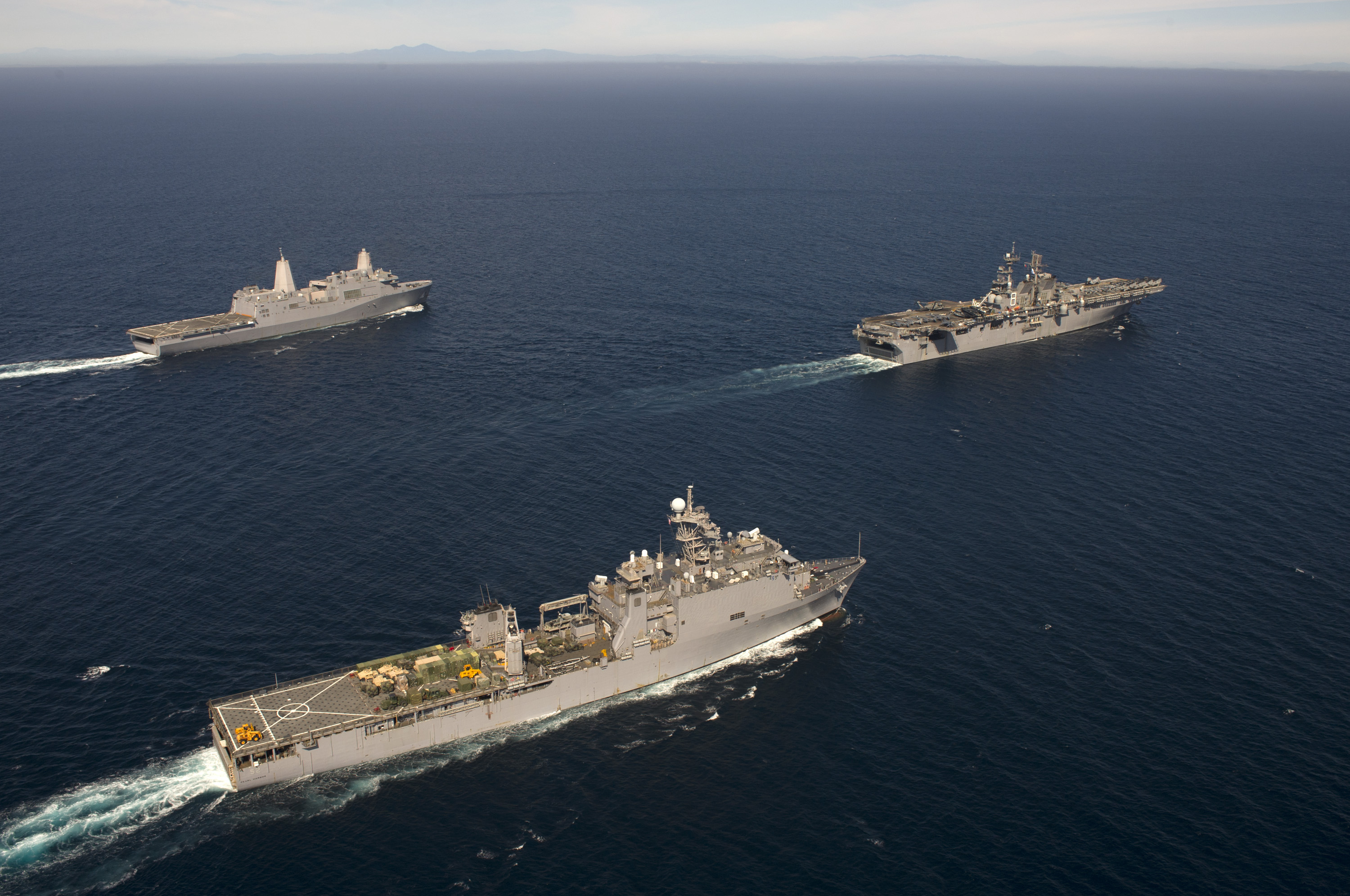
Three US amphibious warfare ships – a landing helicopter dock leading a landing platform dock (rear) and a landing ship dock (fore)

An amphibious warfare ship (or amphib) is an amphibious vehicle warship employed to land and support ground forces, such as marines, on enemy territory during an amphibious assault.

Specialized shipping can be divided into two types, most crudely described as ships and craft. In general, the ships carry the troops from the port of embarkation to the drop point for the assault and the craft carry the troops from the ship to the shore. Amphibious assaults taking place over short distances can also involve the shore-to-shore technique, where landing craft go directly from the port of embarkation to the assault point. Some tank landing ships may also be able to land troops and equipment directly onto shore after travelling long distances, such as the Ivan Rogov-class landing ship.

== History ==
In the days of sail, ship's boats were used as landing craft. These rowing boats were sufficient, if inefficient, in an era when marines were effectively light infantry, participating mostly in small-scale campaigns in far-flung colonies against less well-equipped indigenous opponents.

In order to support amphibious operations during the landing in Pisagua (1879) by carrying significant quantities of cargo, and landing troops directly onto an unimproved shore, the Government of Chile built flat-bottomed landing craft, called chalanas. They transported 1,200 men in the first landing and took onboard 600 men in less than 2 hours for the second landing.

=== Origins ===
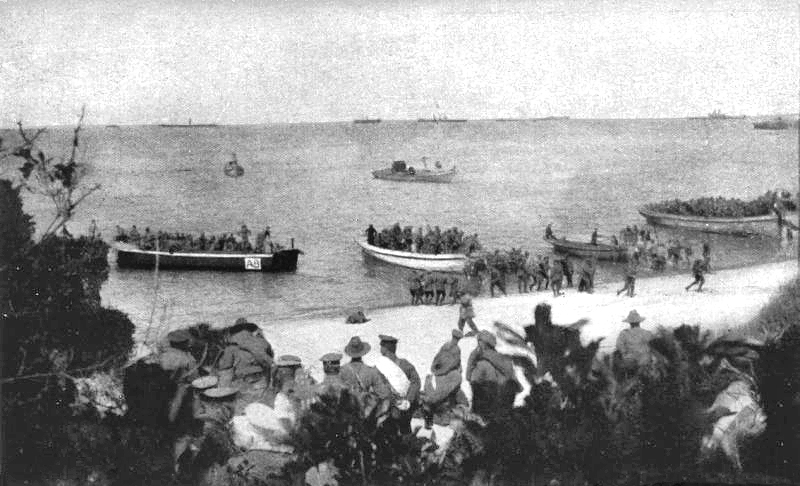
Anzac Cove amphibious landing, on April 25, 1915.

During World War I, the mass mobilization of troops equipped with rapid-fire weapons quickly rendered such boats obsolete. Initial landings during the Gallipoli campaign took place in unmodified rowing boats that were extremely vulnerable to attack from the Ottoman shore defences.

In February 1915, orders were placed for the design of purpose-built landing craft. A design was created in four days resulting in an order for 200 'X' lighters (or X-lighters) with a spoon-shaped bow to take shelving beaches and a drop-down frontal ramp.

The first use took place after they had been towed to the Aegean and performed successfully in the 6 August landing at Suvla Bay of IX Corps, commanded by Commander Edward Unwin.

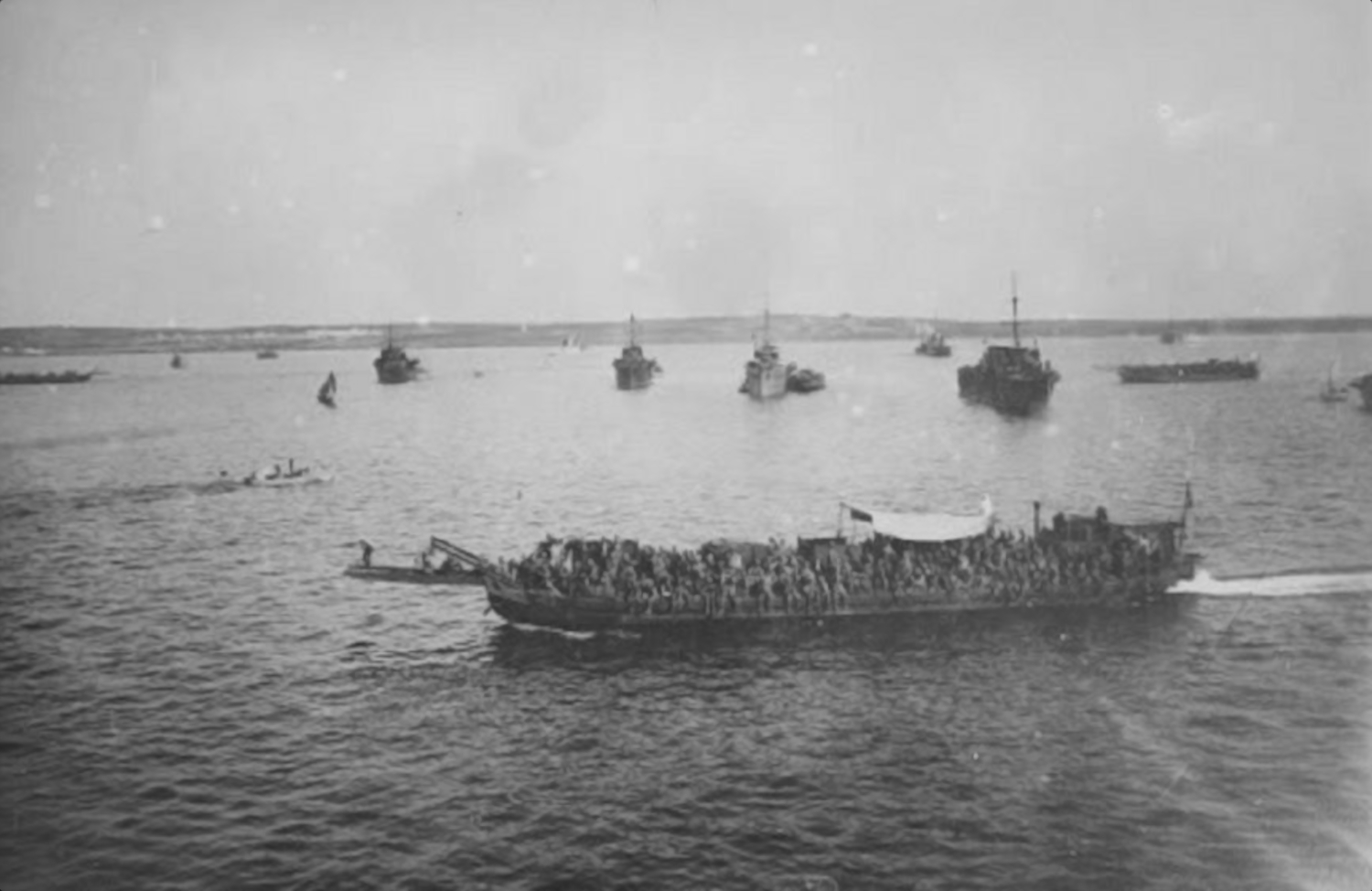
A British X-lighter, 1916

'X' lighters, known to the soldiers as 'Black Beetles', carried about 500 men, displaced 200 tons (or 160 tons according to some sources) and were based on London barges being 105 feet 6 inches (32.2 m) long, 21 feet (6.4 m) wide, and 7 feet 6 inches (2.3 m) deep. The engines mainly ran on heavy oil and ran at a maximal speed of approximately 8 knots (15 km/h; 9.2 mph). The sides of the ships were bullet proof, and was designed with a ramp on the bow for disembarkation.

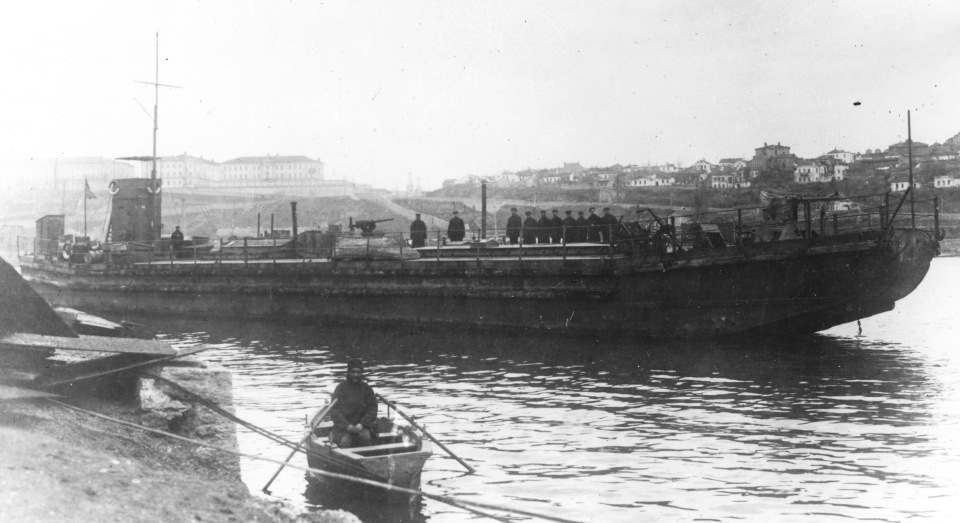
A Russud-class landing self-propelled barge (the Russian designation is Bolinder class), 1919

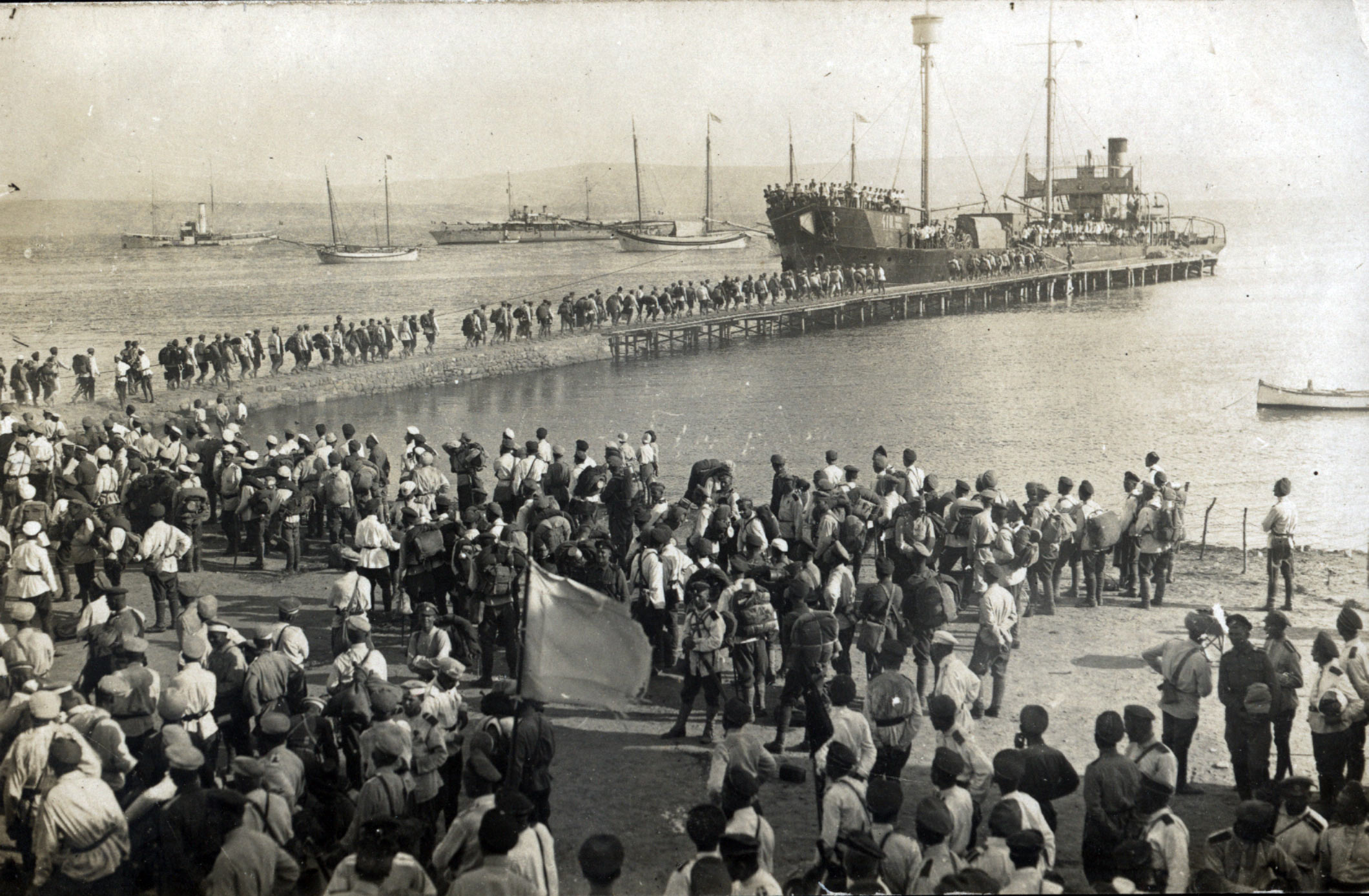
Wrangel's Army troops are being loaded onto the Elpidifor-class landing steamship Vera (ex-Elpidifor No. 410) during departure from Gelibolu to Serbia, 1921

The Imperial Russian Navy soon followed suit, building at the Russud Shipyard in 1916 a series of similar landing motor barges of the so-called Bolinder class (a.k.a. the Russud class), named in Russia after the supplier of semi-diesel engines installed in them. These, however, proved too small and unseaworthy for their intended Black Sea theater, as they were intended for planned landings on the coast of the Marmara Sea and Turkish Straits. Instead, a new ship class was designed, based on a widespread in Southern Russia merchant ship type of the era which were Azov–Black Sea steam schooners – so-called Elpidifors – commissioned into naval service during World War I and used as landing craft during the Trebizond Campaign, etc. These vessels were given the Elpidifors appellative after one of them, the grain carrier Elpidifor, which was owned by the Rostov-on-Don merchant Elpidifor Paramonov. These were typically very light at the bow, having all their machinery concentrated at the stern, which allowed easy beaching on any gently sloping coast, and often were equipped with bow gangways for fast unloading. This resulted in the 1,300-tonne (1,280-long-ton; 1,430-short-ton), 676-metric-horsepower (667 ihp) Elpidifor class, named after the Elpidifor Paramonov's eponymous grain carrier that served as a pattern on which it was based. Elpidifor-class steamships had a 1.83-metre (6.0 ft) loaded mean draft and a reinforced hull, were equipped with ballast tanks for safe beaching, and able to land 1,000 troops with their train at virtually any available beach. While the landings for which they were created never happened, the ship class themself turned out quite useful and ships of the class had a long career, supporting Wrangel's Army landings in Kuban and in Northern Taurida during the Russian Civil War, and later were used by the Russian SFSR and the Soviet Union as minesweepers, minelayers, gunboats, and merchant ships.

A plan was devised to land British heavy tanks from pontoons in support of the Third Battle of Ypres, but this was abandoned.

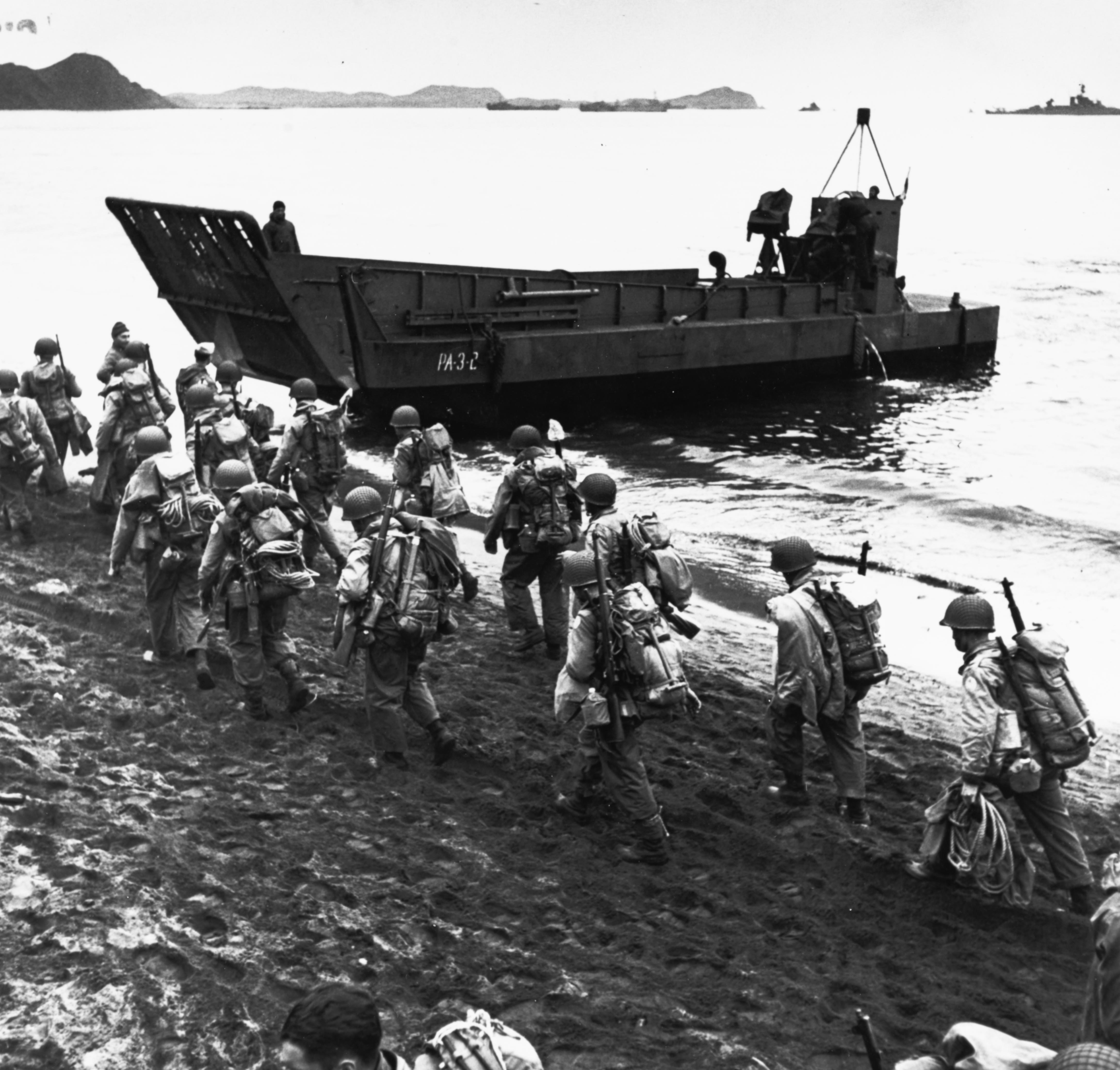
US Landing Craft Mechanized in Kiska during the Aleutian Islands Campaign.

During the inter-war period, the combination of the negative experience at Gallipoli and economic stringency contributed to the delay in procuring equipment and adopting a universal doctrine for amphibious operations in the Royal Navy.

Despite this outlook, the British produced the Motor Landing Craft in 1920, based on their experience with the early 'Black Beetle' armoured transport. The craft could put a medium tank directly onto a beach. From 1924, it was used with landing boats in annual exercises in amphibious landings. A prototype motor landing craft, designed by J. Samuel White of Cowes, was built and first sailed in 1926.

It weighed 16 tons and had a box-like appearance, having a square bow and stern. To prevent fouling of the propellers in a craft destined to spend time in surf and possibly be beached, a crude waterjet propulsion system was devised by White's designers. A Hotchkiss petrol engine drove a centrifugal pump which produced a jet of water, pushing the craft ahead or astern, and steering it, according to how the jet was directed. Speed was 5 to 6 knots (9.3 to 11.1 km/h; 5.8 to 6.9 mph) and its beaching capacity was good. By 1930, three MLC were operated by the Royal Navy.

The United States revived and experimented in their approach to amphibious warfare between 1913 and the mid-1930s, when the United States Navy and United States Marine Corps became interested in setting up advanced bases in opposing countries during wartime; the prototype advanced base force officially evolved into the Fleet Marine Force (FMF) in 1933.

In 1939, during the annual Fleet Landing Exercises, the FMF became interested in the military potential of Andrew Higgins's design of a powered, shallow-draught boat. These LCPL, dubbed the 'Higgins Boats', were reviewed and passed by the U.S. Naval Bureau of Construction and Repair. Soon, the Higgins boats were developed to a final design with a ramp - the LCVP, and were produced in large numbers. The boat was a more flexible variant of the LCPR with a wider ramp. It could carry 36 troops, a small vehicle such as a jeep, or a corresponding amount of cargo.

=== Second World War ===
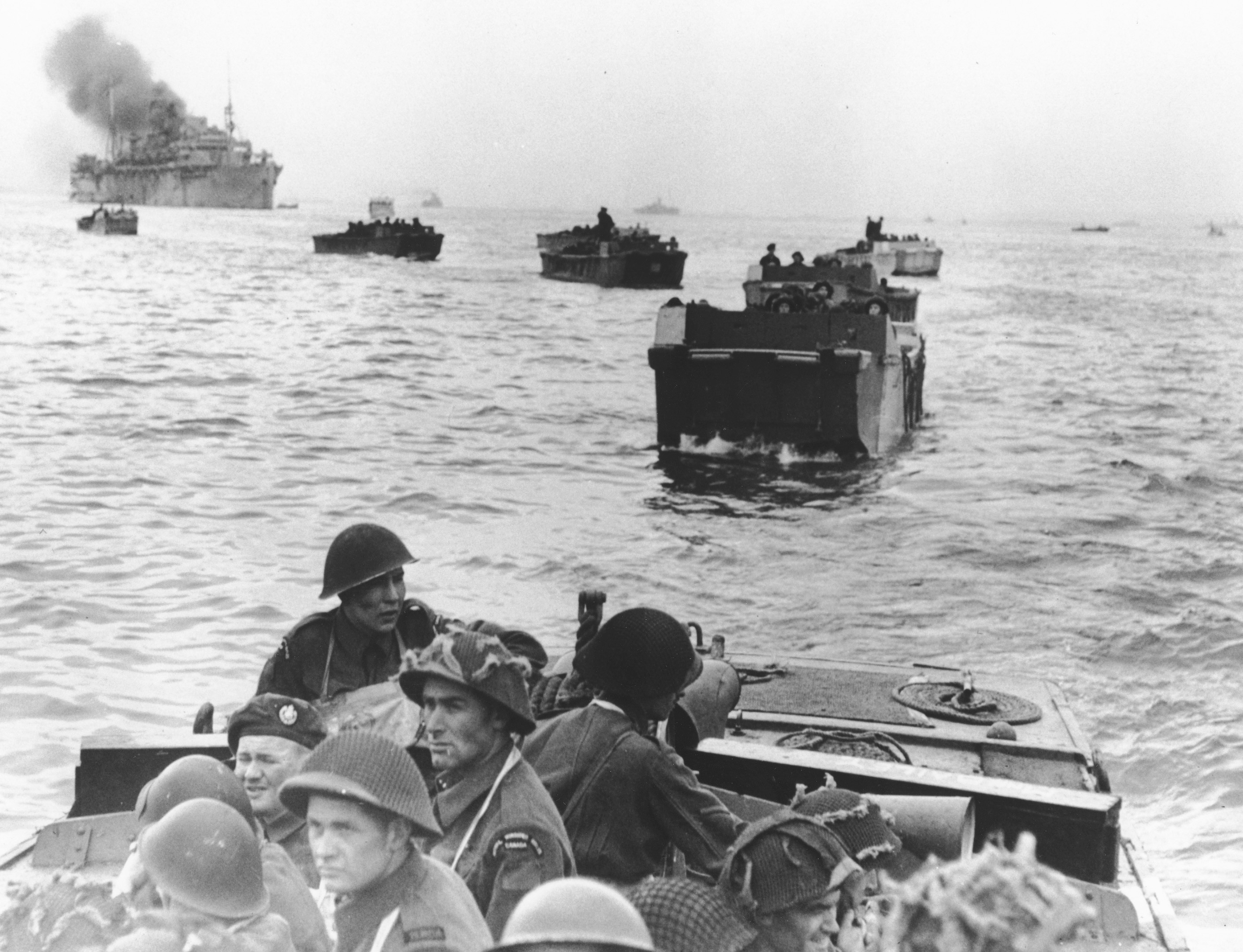
Canadian landings at Juno Beach in the Landing Craft Assault.

==== Specialized infantry landing craft ====
In the run-up to WWII, many specialized landing craft, both for infantry and vehicles, were developed. In November 1938, the British Inter-Service Training and Development Centre proposed a new type of landing craft. Its specifications were to weigh less than ten long tons, to be able to carry the thirty-one men of a British Army platoon and five assault engineers or signallers, and to be so shallow drafted as to be able to land them, wet only up to their knees, in eighteen inches of water. All of these specifications made the Landing Craft Assault; a separate set of requirements was laid down for a vehicle and supplies carrier, although previously the two roles had been combined in the Motor Landing Craft.

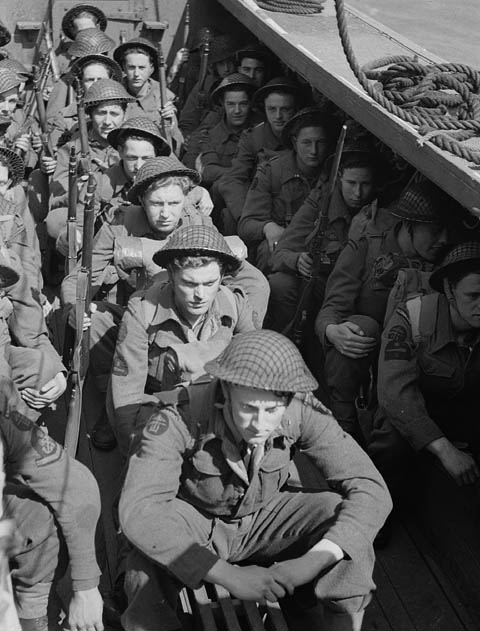
Royal Navy Beach Commandos aboard a Landing Craft Assault of the 529th Flotilla, Royal Navy.

J. S. White of Cowes built a prototype to the Fleming design. Eight weeks later the craft was doing trials on the River Clyde. All landing craft designs must find a compromise between two divergent priorities; the qualities that make a good sea boat are opposite those that make a craft suitable for beaching. The craft had a hull built of double-diagonal mahogany planking. The sides were plated with "10lb. DIHT" armour, a heat-treated steel based on D1 steel, in this case Hadfield's Resista ¼".

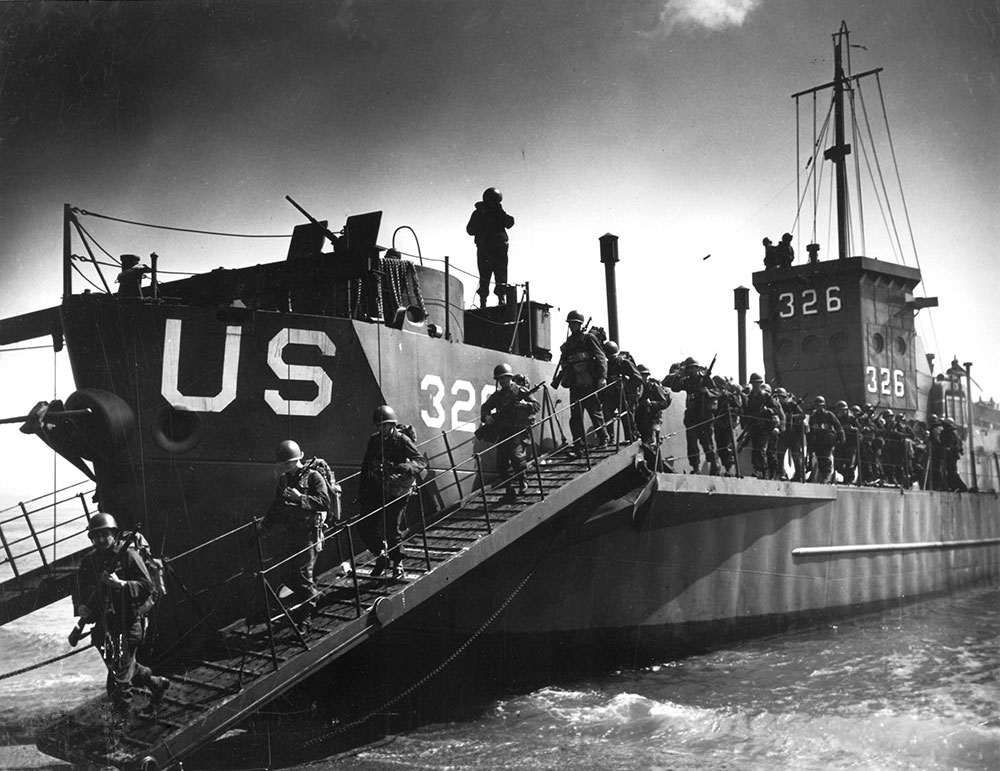
USS LCI-326, a Landing Craft Infantry, during training for D-Day

The Landing Craft Assault remained the most common British and Commonwealth landing craft of World War II, and the humblest vessel admitted to the books of the Royal Navy on D-Day. Prior to July 1942, these craft were referred to as "Assault Landing Craft" (ALC), but "Landing Craft; Assault" (LCA) was used thereafter to conform with the joint US-UK nomenclature system.

The Landing Craft Infantry was a stepped up amphibious assault ship, developed in response to a British request for a vessel capable of carrying and landing substantially more troops than the smaller Landing Craft Assault (LCA). The result was a small steel ship that could land 200 troops, traveling from rear bases on its own bottom at a speed of up to 15 knots. The original British design was envisioned as being a "one time use" vessel which would simply ferry the troops across the English Channel, and were considered an expendable vessel. As such, no troop sleeping accommodations were placed in the original design. This was changed shortly after initial use of these ships, when it was discovered that many missions would require overnight accommodations.

The first LCI(L)s entered service in 1943 chiefly with the Royal Navy and the United States Navy. Some 923 LCI were built in ten American shipyards and 211 provided under lend-lease to the Royal Navy.

==== Specialized vehicle landing craft ====
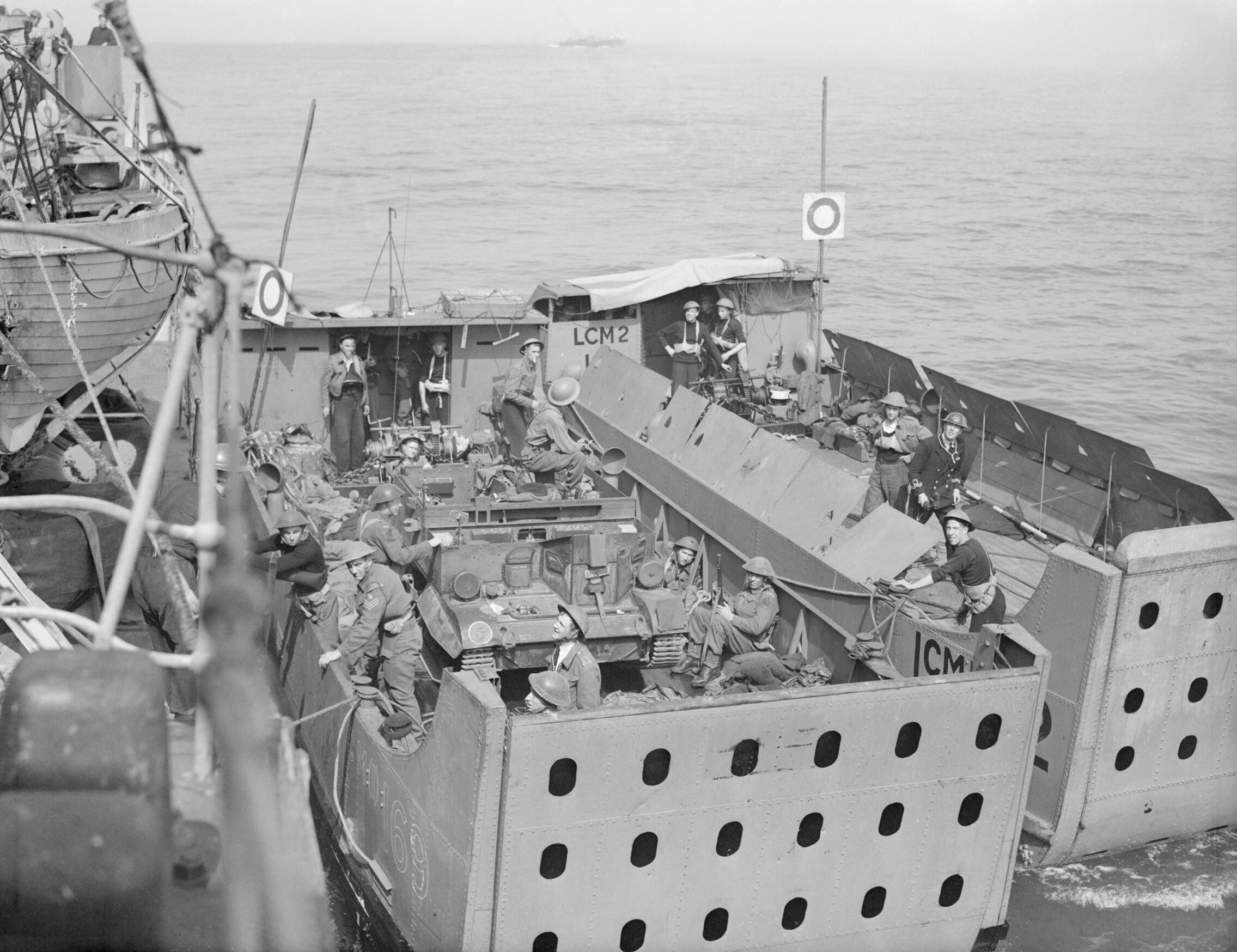
Two examples of the LCM 1 during the 1942 Dieppe Raid

Following the successful development of the infantry carrying LCA by the Inter-Service Training and Development Centre (ISTDC), attention turned to the means of efficiently delivering a tank to a beach in 1938. Inquires were made of the army as to the heaviest tank that might be employed in a landing operation. The army wanted to be able to land a 12-ton tank, but the ISTDC, anticipating weight increases in future tank models specified 16 tons burthen for mechanised landing craft designs. Another limit on any design was the need to land tanks and other vehicles in less than approximately 2½ feet of water.

Design work began at John I. Thornycroft Ltd. in May 1938 with trials completing in February 1940. Constructed of steel and selectively clad with armour plate, this shallow-draft, barge-like boat with a crew of 6, could ferry a tank of 16 long tons to shore at 7 knots (13 km/h). Depending on the weight of the tank to be transported the craft might be lowered into the water by its davits already loaded or could have the tank placed in it after being lowered into the water.

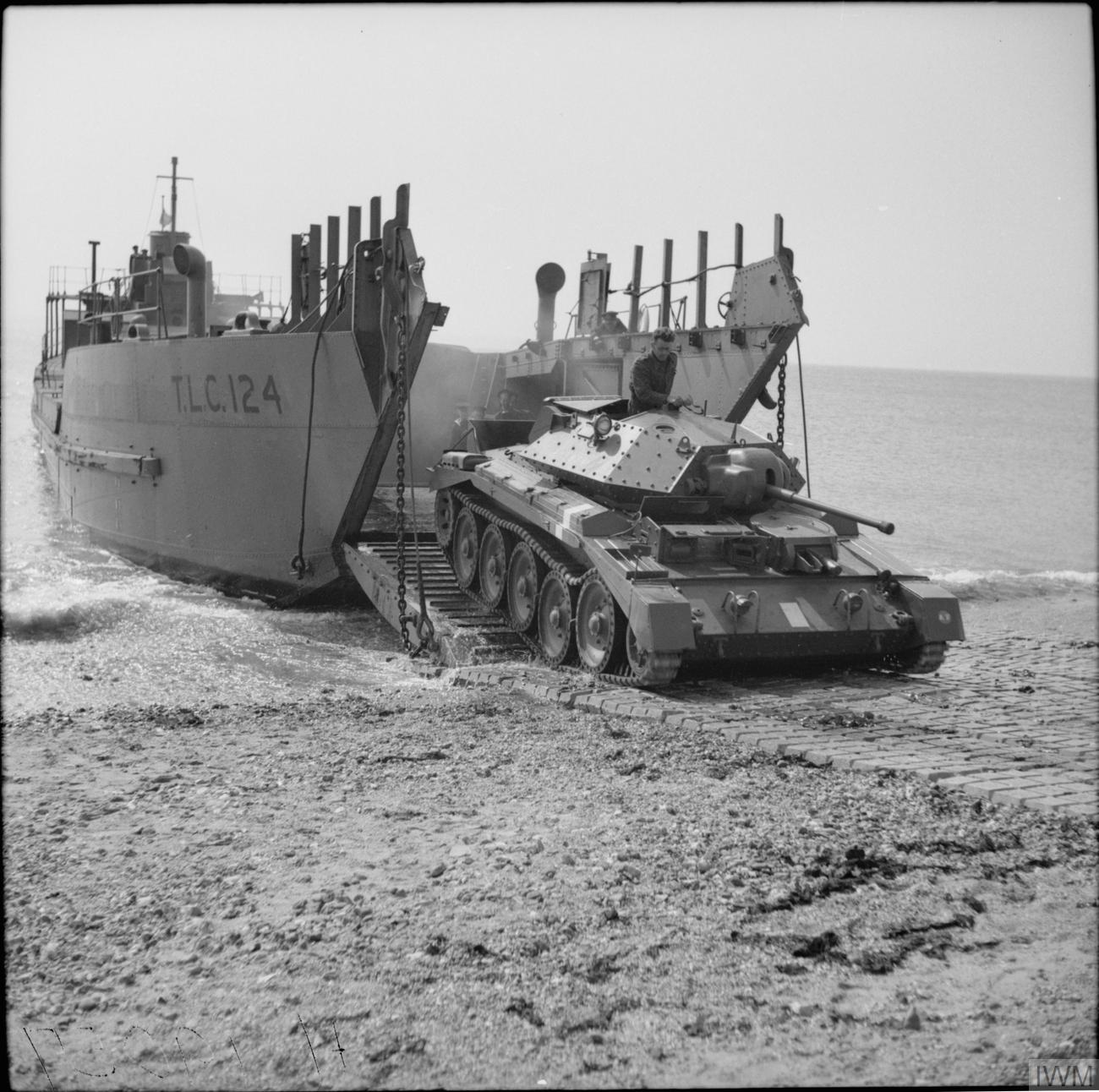
A Crusader I tank emerges from the Tank Landing Craft TLC-124, 26 April 1942

Although the Royal Navy had the Landing Craft Mechanised at its disposal, in 1940, Prime Minister Winston Churchill demanded an amphibious vessel capable of landing at least three 36-ton heavy tanks directly onto a beach, able to sustain itself at sea for at least a week, and inexpensive and easy to build. Admiral Maund, director of the Inter-Service Training and Development Centre (which had developed the Landing Craft Assault), gave the job to naval architect Sir Roland Baker, who within three days completed initial drawings for a 152-foot (46 m) landing craft with a 29-foot (8.8 m) beam and a shallow draft. Ship builders Fairfields and John Brown agreed to work out details for the design under the guidance of the Admiralty Experimental Works at Haslar. Tank tests with models soon determined the characteristics of the craft, indicating that it would make 10 knots (19 km/h; 12 mph) on engines delivering about 700 hp (520 kW). Designated the LCT Mark 1, 20 were ordered in July 1940 and a further 10 in October 1940.

The first LCT Mark 1 was launched by Hawthorn Leslie in November 1940. It was an all-welded 372-ton steel-hulled vessel that drew only 3 feet (0.91 m) of water at the bow. Sea trials soon proved the Mark 1 to be difficult to handle and almost unmanageable in some sea conditions. The designers set about correcting the faults of the Mark 1 in the LCT Mark 2. Longer and wider, with 15 and 20 lb. armoured shielding added to the wheelhouse and gun tubs.

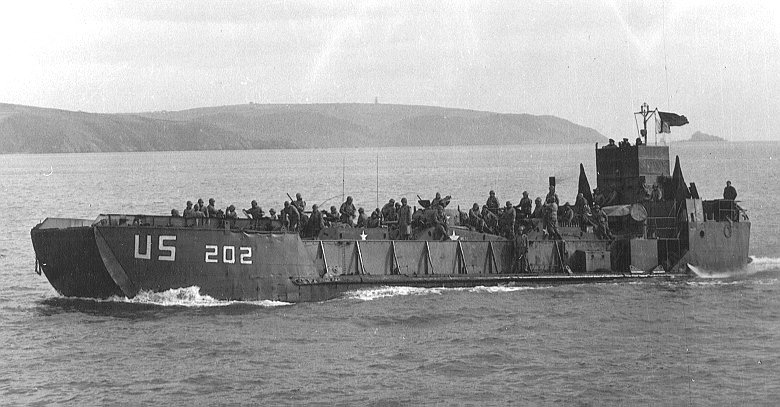
LCT-202 off the coast of England, 1944.

The Mark 3 had an additional 32-foot (9.8 m) midsection that gave it a length of 192 feet (59 m) and a displacement of 640 tons. Even with this extra weight, the vessel was slightly faster than the Mark 1. The Mk.3 was accepted on 8 April 1941. The Mark 4 was slightly shorter and lighter than the Mk.3, but had a much wider beam (38 ft 9 in (11.81 m)) and was intended for cross channel operations as opposed to seagoing use. When tested in early assault operations, like the ill-fated Allied raid on Dieppe in 1942, the lack of manoeuvring ability led to the preference for a shorter overall length in future variants, most of which were built in the United States.

When the United States entered the war in December 1941, the U.S. Navy had no amphibious vessels at all, and found itself obliged to consider British designs already in existence. One of these, advanced by K.C. Barnaby of Thornycroft, was for a double-ended LCT to work with landing ships. The Bureau of Ships quickly set about drawing up plans for landing craft based on Barnaby's suggestions, although with only one ramp. The result, in early 1942, was the LCT Mark 5, a 117-foot craft that could accommodate five 30-ton or four 40-ton tanks or 150 tons of cargo. This 286-ton landing craft could be shipped to combat areas in three separate water-tight sections aboard a cargo ship or carried pre-assembled on the flat deck of a Landing Ship, Tank (LST). The Mk.5 would be launched by heeling the LST on its beam to let the craft slide off its chocks into the sea, or cargo ships could lower each of the three sections into the sea where they were joined.

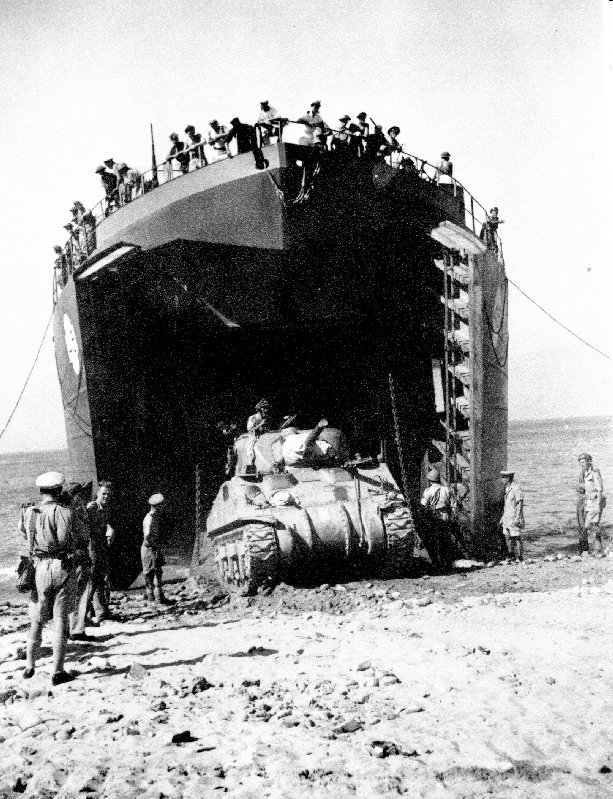
A Canadian LST off-loads an M4 Sherman during the Allied invasion of Sicily in 1943.

A further development was the Landing Ship, Tank designation, built to support amphibious operations by carrying significant quantities of vehicles, cargo, and landing troops directly onto an unimproved shore. The British evacuation from Dunkirk in 1940 demonstrated to the Admiralty that the Allies needed relatively large, ocean-going ships capable of shore-to-shore delivery of tanks and other vehicles in amphibious assaults upon the continent of Europe. The first purpose-built LST design was HMS Boxer. To carry 13 Churchill infantry tanks, 27 vehicles and nearly 200 men (in addition to the crew) at a speed of 18 knots, it could not have the shallow draught that would have made for easy unloading. As a result, each of the three (Boxer, Bruiser, and Thruster) ordered in March 1941 had a very long ramp stowed behind the bow doors.

In November 1941, a small delegation from the British Admiralty arrived in the United States to pool ideas with the United States Navy's Bureau of Ships with regard to the development of ships and also including the possibility of building further Boxers in the US. During this meeting, it was decided that the Bureau of Ships would design these vessels. The LST(2) design incorporated elements of the first British LCTs from their designer, Sir Rowland Baker, who was part of the British delegation. This included sufficient buoyancy in the ships' sidewalls that they would float even with the tank deck flooded. The LST(2) gave up the speed of HMS Boxer at only 10 knots but had a similar load while drawing only 3 feet forward when beaching.

Congress provided the authority for the construction of LSTs along with a host of other auxiliaries, destroyer escorts, and assorted landing craft. The enormous building program quickly gathered momentum. Such a high priority was assigned to the construction of LSTs that the previously laid keel of an aircraft carrier was hastily removed to make room for several LSTs to be built in her place. The keel of the first LST was laid down on 10 June 1942 at Newport News, Va., and the first standardized LSTs were floated out of their building dock in October. Twenty-three were in commission by the end of 1942. Lightly armored, they could steam cross the ocean with a full load on their own power, carrying infantry, tanks and supplies directly onto the beaches. Together with 2,000 other landing craft, the LSTs gave the troops a protected, quick way to make combat landings, beginning in summer 1943.

==== Other ====
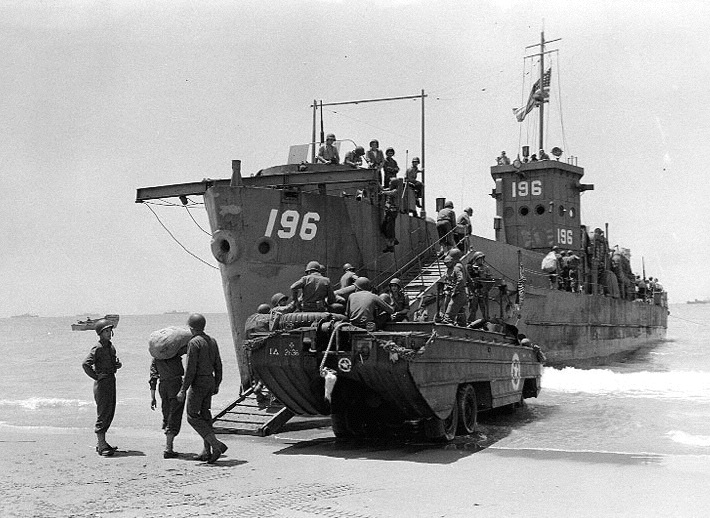
LCI(L) 196 and a DUKW during the Invasion of Sicily 1943 (World War II)

Nine-ton Landing Craft Navigation (LCN) were used by British "combined operations assault pilotage parties" (Royal Marine and Special Boat Service crew) for surveying landing sites.

The Landing Craft Control (LCC) were 56-foot (17 m) U.S. Navy vessels, carrying only the crew (Scouts and Raiders) and newly developed radar. Their main job was to find and follow the safe routes in to the beach, which were lanes that had been cleared of obstacles and mines. There were eight in the entire Normandy invasion (two per beach). After leading in the first wave, they were to head back out and bring in the second wave. After that, they were used as all-purpose command and control assets during the invasion.

Very small landing craft, or amphibians, were designed. The U.S.-designed Landing Vehicle Tracked, was an amphibious (and sometimes armored) personnel carrier. These were operated by Army personnel, not naval crews and had a capacity of about three tons. The British introduced their own amphibian, the Terrapin.

A Landing Craft Utility (LCU) was used to transport equipment and troops to the shore. It was capable of transporting tracked or wheeled vehicles and troops from amphibious assault ships to beachheads or piers.

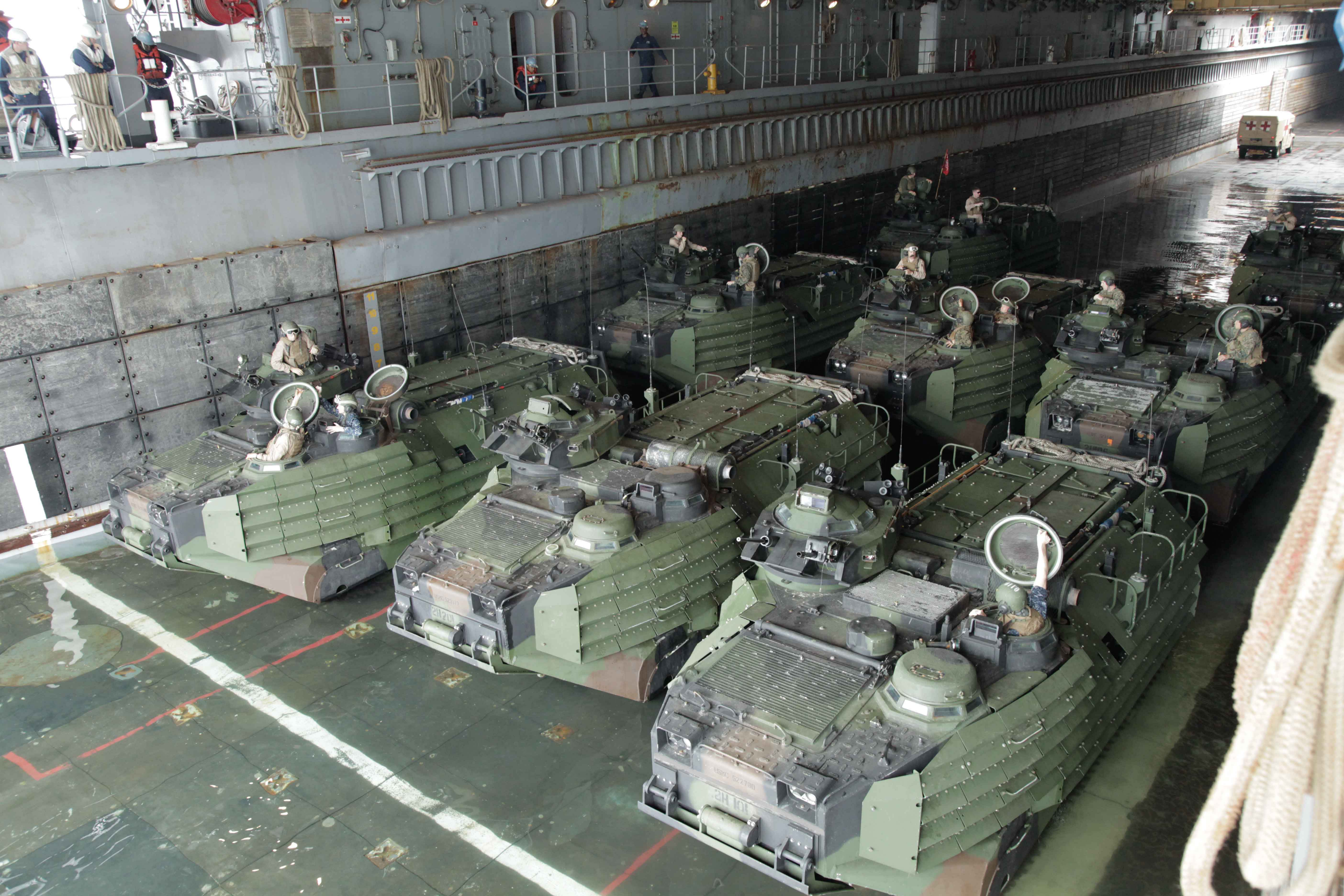
Amphibious vehicles inside a US LSD.

The Landing Ship Dock, came as a result of a British requirement for a vessel that could carry large landing craft across the seas at speed. The first LSD came from a design by Sir Roland Baker and was an answer to the problem of launching small craft rapidly. The Landing Ship Stern Chute, which was a converted train ferry, was an early attempt. Thirteen Landing Craft Mechanized (LCM) could be launched from these ships down the chute. The Landing Ship Gantry was a converted tanker with a crane to transfer its cargo of landing craft from deck to sea - 15 LCM in a little over half an hour.

The design was developed and built in the US for the USN and the Royal Navy. The LSD could carry 36 LCM at 16 knots. It had a large open compartment at the back. Opening a stern door and flooding special compartments opened this area to the sea so that LCI-sized vessels could enter or leave. It took one and a half hours for the dock to be flooded down and two and half to pump it out. When flooded they could also be used as docks for repairs to small craft.

Due to their small size, most amphibious ships were not given names and were just given serial numbers, for example, LCT 304. The LSTs were an exception to this, since they were similar in size to a small cruiser. In addition, three British-built LSTs were named: HMS Boxer, HMS Bruiser and HMS Thruster; these were all larger than the U.S. design and had proper funnels.

==== Special craft ====
It was soon realized that battleships, cruisers and destroyers could not necessarily provide all the fire support (including suppressive fire) that an amphibious assault might need. Therefore, specialized vessels were developed that incorporated various direct and indirect fire weapons. These included guns and rockets which could be mounted on landing craft and landing ships. As part of the final barrage before an assault, the landing area would be plastered by these types.

Amphibious landing craft of WWII were generally fitted out with minimal weaponry. LCA crews were issued with.303 inch Lewis Guns, which were mounted in a light machine gun shelter on the forward-port side of the craft; these could be used both as anti-aircraft protection and against shore targets. Later models were fitted with two 2 inch mortars, and two Lewis or.303 Bren light machine guns. LCM 1 crews were issued with Lewis guns, and many LCM 3s had.50 in (12.7 mm) Browning machine guns mounted for anti-aircraft protection. Opportunities for troops on board to use their own weapons presented themselves.

LCIs and LCTs carried heavier weapons, such as the Oerlikon 20 mm cannon, on each side of the bridge structure. LSTs had a somewhat heavier armament.

Some landing craft were converted for special purposes either to provide defence for the other landing craft in the attack or as support weapons during the landing.

Landing Craft Assault (Hedgehog)

The LCA(HR) was a converted British LCA. It carried a battery of 24 spigot mortars, the Royal Navy's Hedgehog anti-submarine weapon, instead of personnel. The mortars were fired as a barrage onto the beach to clear mines and other obstructions. Having discharged its mortars and its duty, the LCA(HR) would leave the beach area. They were towed to the beach by larger craft, such as the LCTs that carried the Royal Engineer assault teams with their specialist vehicles and equipment, who would complete the beach clearance.

Three flotillas (of 18, 18 and 9 craft) were used at Juno, Gold and Sword beaches.

Landing Craft Flak

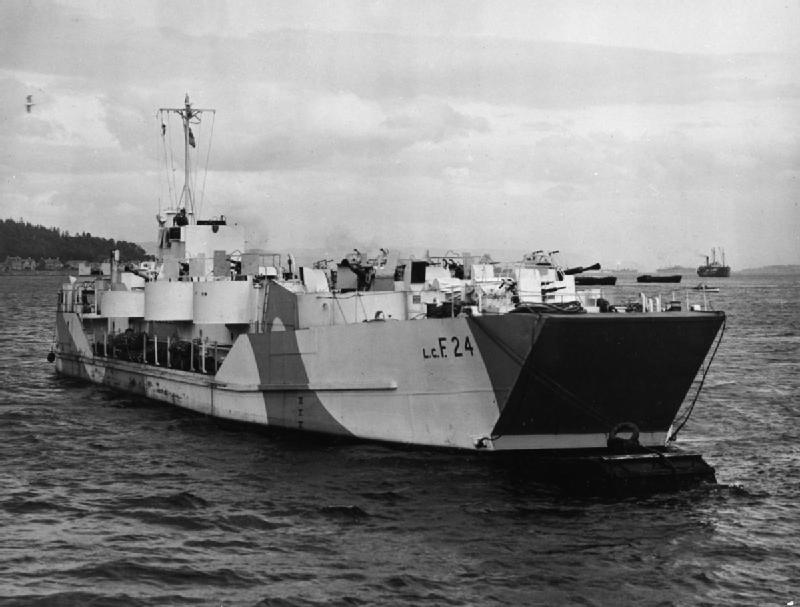
Landing craft flaks were equipped with 20 mm Oerlikons and four QF 2 pdr "pom-poms" to defend against aircraft.

The Landing Craft Flak (LCF) was a conversion of the LCT that was intended to give anti-aircraft support to the landing. They were first used in the Dieppe Raid early in 1942. The ramp was welded shut, and a deck built on top of the tank deck. They were equipped with several light anti-aircraft guns—a typical fitting was eight 20 mm Oerlikons and four QF 2 pdr "pom-poms" and had a crew of 60. On British examples, the operation of the craft was the responsibility of RN crew and the guns were manned by Royal Marines. They carried two naval officers and two marine officers.

Landing Craft Gun

The Landing Craft Gun (LCG) was another LCT conversion intended to give supporting fire to the landing. Apart from the Oerlikon armament of a normal LCT, each LCG(Medium) had two British Army 25-pounder gun-howitzers in armoured mountings, while LCG(L)3 and LCG(L)4 both had two 4.7 inch naval guns. Crewing was similar to the LCF. LCGs played a very important part in the Walcheren operations in October 1944.

Landing Craft Rocket

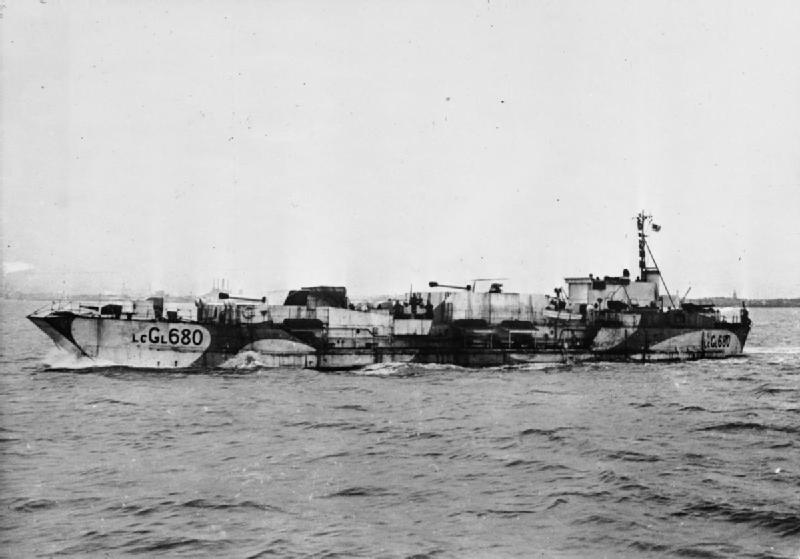
Landing Craft Gun carried two 25-pounder gun-howitzers

The Landing Craft Tank (Rocket), LCT(R), was an LCT modified to carry a large set of launchers for the British RP-3 "60 lb" rockets mounted on the covered-over tank deck. The full set of launchers was "in excess of" 1,000 and 5,000 reloads were kept below. The firepower was claimed to be equivalent to 80 light cruisers or 200 destroyers.

The method of operation was to anchor off the target beach, pointing towards the shore. The distance to the shore was then measured by radar and the elevation of the launchers set accordingly. The crew then vanished below, apart from the commanding officer who retreated to a special cubbyhole, and the launch was then set off electrically. The launch could comprise the entire set or individual ranks of rockets.

A full reload was a very labor-intensive operation and at least one LCT(R) went alongside a cruiser and got a working party from the larger ship to assist in the process.

Landing Craft Support

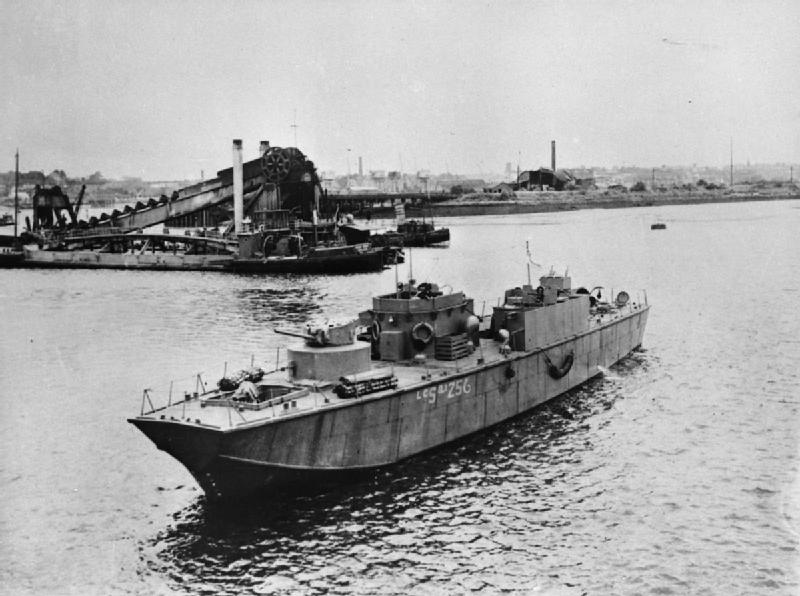
Landing Craft Support was armed with Vickers machine guns and mortar.

The Landing Craft Support was used to give some firepower at close range.

The Landing Craft Support (Medium) (LCS(M)), Mark 2 and Mark 3 were used by the British forces at Normandy. The crew was Royal Navy, with Royal Marines to operate the weapons: two 0.5 inch Vickers machine guns and a 4-inch mortar to fire smoke shells.

The Fairmile H Landing Craft Support (Large) had armour added to its wooden hull and a turret with an anti-tank gun fitted. The LCS(L) Mark 1 had a Daimler armoured car turret with its QF 2–pdr (40 mm) gun. The Mark 2 had a QF 6–pdr (57 mm) anti–tank gun.

The American Landing Craft Support was larger, each was armed with a 3-inch gun, various smaller guns, and ten MK7 rocket launchers.

Inflatable landing craft

Inflatable boats were often used to transport amphibious troops from high speed transports and submarines. The United States used a 7-man Landing Craft, Rubber (Small) (LCR-S) and a 10-man Landing Craft, Rubber (Large) (LCR-L).

The first and last instances of the large use of rubber boats in amphibious operations in World War II were the Makin Island raid in 1942 and the landing of the 1st Battalion 6th Marines Battle of Tarawa in 1943 where the Battalion commander Major William K. Jones was nicknamed "Admiral of the Condom Fleet".

=== Early Cold War developments ===
Despite all the progress that was seen during World War II, there were still fundamental limitations in the types of coastline that were suitable for assault. Beaches had to be relatively free of obstacles, and have the right tidal conditions and the correct slope. However, the development of the helicopter fundamentally changed the equation.

The first use of helicopters in an amphibious assault came during the Anglo-French-Israeli invasion of Egypt in 1956 (the Suez War). Two British light fleet carriers were pressed into service to carry helicopters, and a battalion-sized airborne assault was made. Two of the other carriers involved, Bulwark and Albion, were converted in the late 1950s into dedicated "commando carriers".

The US Navy built five Iwo Jima-class landing platform helicopter vessels in the 1950s and 1960s, and converted various fleet and escort carriers for the purpose of providing a helicopter amphibious assault capability. The first of the type envisaged was the escort carrier Block Island, which never actually saw service as an amphibious assault ship. Delays in the construction of the Iwo Jima class saw other conversions made as a stopgap measure; three Essex-class aircraft carriers (Boxer, Princeton, and Valley Forge) and one Casablanca-class escort carrier (Thetis Bay) were converted into Boxer- and Thetis Bay-class amphibious assault vessels. Helicopter amphibious assault techniques were developed further by American forces in the Vietnam War and refined during training exercises.

The Tarawa and Wasp class types resemble aircraft carriers. However, the role of an amphibious assault ship is fundamentally different from that of an aircraft carrier. Its aviation facilities are not to support strike or air defense aircraft, but for hosting helicopters to support forces ashore.

=== Future developments ===
One of the most recent innovations is the LCAC (Landing Craft Air Cushioned). These large hovercraft further expand the range of conditions under which an amphibious assault can take place and increase the speed of transfer of assets from ship to shore. Ground effect vehicles, which straddle the line between aircraft and ship, have also been proposed for the role in the past.

Amphibious assault submarines, while proposed during the 1950s, and almost brought to actual construction by the Soviet Union in the 1960s, are currently not being designed. However, if the predictions of military experts such as John Keegan or others hold true, and surface shipping becomes extremely dangerous during future wars of evenly matched powers (due to satellite reconnaissance and anti-ship missiles), then transport and amphibious assault submarines might deserve another look.

The United States Navy's Light Amphibious Warship program seeks to procure 28 to 30 new light amphibious ships starting in 2023.

== List of United States Navy hull classification symbols ==
The US Navy hull classification symbol for a ship with a well deck depends on its facilities for aircraft:

- An LSD has a helicopter deck.
- An LPD has a hangar in addition to the helicopter deck.
- An LHD or LHA has a full-length flight deck.

Examples:

- LHA: Landing Helicopter Assault (Tarawa class, America class)
- LHD: Landing Helicopter Dock (Wasp class)
- LPH: Landing Platform Helicopter (Iwo Jima class)
- LPD: Landing Platform Dock (San Antonio class)
- LSD: Landing Ship Dock (Whidbey Island class, Harpers Ferry class)
- LSI: Landing Ship, Infantry was previously designated as Landing Craft, Infantry
- LSL: Landing Ship Logistics
- LSM: Landing Ship Medium
- LST: Landing Ship Tank
- LCC: Amphibious Command Ship, unrelated to the Landing Craft, Control (LCC)
- AGF: Auxiliary Command Ship
- AKA/LKA: Attack cargo ship
- AP/APA/LPA: Auxiliary Personnel Assault
- ARL: Landing Craft Repair Ship (Achelous class)

== See also ==
- Amphibious assault ship
- Landing craft
- List of amphibious warfare ships
- Amphibious ready group
