= HMS Tasajera =

Royal Navy tank landing ship of WW2

History

United Kingdom
- Name: Tasajera
- Builder: Furness Shipbuilding Company, Haverton Hill-on-Tees
- Laid down: 6 August 1937
- Launched: 3 March 1938
- Commissioned: December 1941
- Decommissioned: March 1945
- Identification: Pennant number: F125
- Fate: Returned to Merchant service, 1945

General characteristics
- Type: Mark I LST
- Displacement: 4,193 tons
- Length: 379.4 ft (115.6 m)
- Beam: 64.2 ft (19.6 m)
- Draught: Fully laden : 15 ft (4.6 m) aft; 4 ft (1.2 m) forward
- Ramps: 100 ft (30 m) extending bow ramp
- Capacity: 18 × 30-ton tanks or 22 × 25-ton tanks or 33 heavy trucks
- Troops: 217
- Complement: 98
- Armament: 1 × single (from early 1944, twin) QF 2 pounder naval gun(s); 6 × single Oerlikon 20 mm cannon; 3 × Lewis guns; Smoke mortar

HMS Tasajera (F125) was a Maracaibo-class Mark I landing ship, tank of the Royal Navy during World War II. A converted Lake Maracaibo oil tanker.

== Design ==
Tasajera was one of three shallow-draught oil tankers built by the Furness Shipbuilding Company of Haverton Hill-on-Tees in 1937 to operate in Lake Maracaibo in Venezuela. She was requisitioned by the Royal Navy in December 1940, along with her sister ships Misoa and Bachaquero, for conversion to a tank landing ship. Her oil tanks were removed to form a tank deck, and two large hatches and two 50-ton derrick cranes fitted to lift vehicles from the tank deck to the upper deck. Her bows were cut off square and a heavy steel door fitted. A hinged extension, together with the door, provided a 100-foot (30 m) ramp to unload vehicles. Steel armour plate was fitted to the bridge and wheelhouse, and the ship was armed with a single 40 mm gun, six 20 mm anti-aircraft guns, three Lewis machine guns, and a smoke mortar. There was accommodation for up to 217 troops, and for a crew of 98. She could carry eighteen 30-ton tanks, or twenty-two 25-ton tanks, or 33 heavy trucks. After refitting was complete she was commissioned in August 1941.

== History ==
=== Initial operations ===
Tasajera left the Clyde in early August 1941 with large squadron of landing and troop ships, escorted by eight destroyers, and headed for Scapa Flow, where four more destroyers joined the convoy, which was intended to seize the Azores. When the operation was cancelled, the ships returned to the Clyde. In January 1942, Misoa was based at Freetown, Sierra Leone, on the South Atlantic Station.

=== North Africa and the Mediterranean ===
The ship then took part on "Operation Torch" - the invasion of North Africa. At 04:00 on 8 November 1942 Tasajera, along with Misoa, and the troopships Durban Castle and Derbyshire, arrived off "Z Beach" at Arzew, Algeria. By 08:00 she had disembarked M3 Stuart tanks of the U.S. 1st Armored Division's "Combat Command B", despite coming under fire from nearby enemy battery. The American troops then moved inland to seize the airfields at La Senia and Tafaroui.

=== Torpedoed ===
On 17 January 1943 Tasajera was travelling at a speed of 9knots having left Algiers.

At 1900 she was struck starboard side amidships by an aerial torpedo blasting a hole 30 x 20feet. She was escorted to Algeria arriving on 18 March. A survey of damage in No1 Dock Oran Algiers on 13 March found damage of 3months repairs. So after temporary repairs Tasajera sailed for the UK end April. (Source ships without names page27 Brain MacDermott)

Seaman Matthew Newlands from Glasgow recorded in correspondence to his young wife Mary that Tasajeera was docked at Tillbury in Sept1943. (Source Mary Newlands)

=== Normandy ===
Tasajera arrived at Plymouth in early January 1944 for repairs and modifications in preparation for the Normandy landings. As well as repairs and general maintenance work, her forward single 40 mm gun was replaced with a twin version, and she was repainted in camouflage colours.

Tasajera embarked tanks of the Canadian Armoured Corps at Tilbury Docks and sailed for northern France on 4 June 1944. The invasion was then postponed for 24 hours owing to the poor weather, so Misoa remained at sea, finally arriving off "Juno Beach" at dawn on "D-Day" 6 June. She disembarked her men, tanks and equipment the following day, and then returned to Tilbury for a second load, returning to "Juno" to disembark them immediately. Unfortunately a tank slipped sideways off the ramp, blocking it and delaying operations. The tide went out and stranded the ship on the beach until the following morning.

Tasajera was then anchored off the beachhead and acted as a "mother ship" to the numerous Motor Torpedo Boats and Motor Gun Boats operating off the beaches, providing accommodation, berths, and medical services.

Damaged 19 July 1944 when she dragged into a 'gooseberry breakwater off Normandy.

Later, she also provided a repair and maintenance service. By late October.
