= HMS Misoa =

Royal Navy tank landing ship of WW2

History

United Kingdom
- Name: HMS Misoa
- Builder: Furness Shipbuilding Company, Haverton Hill-on-Tees
- Launched: 22 June 1937
- Acquired: by requisition, December 1940
- Commissioned: 11 August 1941
- Decommissioned: March 1945
- Identification: Pennant number: F117
- Motto: Latin: Veni, vidi, vici; (English: "I came, I saw, I conquered")
- Fate: Returned to commercial service 1946. Scrapped 1963.

General characteristics
- Type: Landing Ship, Tank
- Displacement: 4,193 tons
- Length: 379.4 ft (115.6 m)
- Beam: 64.2 ft (19.6 m)
- Draught: Fully laden : 15 ft (4.6 m) aft; 4 ft (1.2 m) forward
- Ramps: 100 ft (30 m) extending bow ramp
- Capacity: 18 × 30-ton tanks or 22 × 25-ton tanks or 33 heavy trucks
- Troops: 217
- Complement: 98
- Armament: 1 × single (from early 1944, twin) QF 2 pounder naval gun(s); 6 × single Oerlikon 20 mm cannon; 3 × Lewis guns; Smoke mortar

HMS Misoa was a Maracaibo-class LST Mk.I tank landing ship of the British Royal Navy during World War II. A converted Lake Maracaibo oil tanker, she took part in the invasions of North Africa, Sicily, and Normandy.

== Ship history ==
=== Design and modifications ===
Misoa was one of three shallow-draught oil tankers built by the Furness Shipbuilding Company of Haverton Hill-on-Tees in 1937 to operate in Lake Maracaibo in Venezuela. She was requisitioned by the Royal Navy in December 1940, along with her sister ships Tasajera and Bachaquero, for conversion to a tank landing ship. Her oil tanks were removed to form a tank deck, and two large hatches and two 50-ton derrick cranes fitted to lift vehicles from the tank deck to the upper deck. Her bows were cut off square and a heavy steel door fitted. A hinged extension, together with the door, provided a 100-foot (30 m) ramp to unload vehicles. Steel armour plate was fitted to the bridge and wheelhouse, and the ship was armed with a single 40 mm gun, six 20 mm anti-aircraft guns, three Lewis machine guns, and a smoke mortar. There was accommodation for up to 217 troops, and for a crew of 98. She could carry eighteen 30-ton tanks, or twenty-two 25-ton tanks, or 33 heavy trucks.

=== Initial operations ===
Misoa left the Clyde in early August 1941 with large squadron of landing and troop ships, escorted by eight destroyers, and headed for Scapa Flow, where four more destroyers joined the convoy, which was intended to seize the Azores. When the operation was cancelled, the ships returned to the Clyde. In January 1942, Misoa was based at Freetown, Sierra Leone, on the South Atlantic Station. After refitting was complete she was commissioned in August 1941.

=== North Africa and the Mediterranean ===
The ship then took part on "Operation Torch" - the invasion of North Africa. At 04:00 on 8 November 1942 Misoa, along with Tasajera, and the troopships Durban Castle and Derbyshire, arrived off "Z Beach" at Arzew, Algeria. By 08:00 she had disembarked M3 Stuart tanks of the U.S. 1st Armored Division's "Combat Command B", despite coming under fire from nearby enemy battery. The American troops then moved inland to seize the airfields at La Senia and Tafaroui.

As the Allied armies advanced Misoa was engaged in transporting men and equipment of the U.S. Army from Algiers to Bône. She was then based at Sousse in Tunisia to provide support for operations involving the British Eighth Army. She also made voyages from Sousse to Malta, carrying munitions and fresh food, following the lifting of the siege.

On 10 June 1943 Misoa sailed to the island of Pantellaria, between Sicily and Tunisia, as part of "Operation Corkscrew". The ship arrived to witness the intensive bombing of the island. By noon the Italian garrison had surrendered, and Misoa landed British tanks unopposed. Later in the day Misoa returned to Sousse to embark men and equipment for the invasion of the islands of Lampedusa and Linosa. Misoa then carried Italian prisoners back to Sousse.

A month later Misoa embarked Eighth Army troops and tanks for "Operation Husky" - the Allied invasion of Sicily - landing them just south of Syracuse on 9–10 July. For the next two months she made frequent passages to Sousse carrying prisoners, captured tanks and other equipment, and returning with supplies, materials, and men. Following Sicily's fall she continued in this role, supporting operations on the Italian mainland. Following the armistice in September she sailed to the port of Taranto to load captured German and Italian guns, tanks, communications vehicles and half-tracks for transport back to England.

=== Normandy ===
Misoa arrived at Plymouth in early January 1944 for repairs and modifications in preparation for the Normandy landings. As well as repairs and general maintenance work, her forward single 40 mm gun was replaced with a twin version, and she was repainted in camouflage colours.

Misoa embarked tanks of the Canadian Armoured Corps at Tilbury Docks and sailed for northern France on 4 June 1944. The invasion was then postponed for 24 hours owing to the poor weather, so Misoa remained at sea, finally arriving off "Juno Beach" at dawn on "D-Day" 6 June. She disembarked her men, tanks and equipment the following day, and then returned to Tilbury for a second load, returning to "Juno" to disembark them immediately. Unfortunately a tank slipped sideways off the ramp, blocking it and delaying operations. The tide went out and stranded the ship on the beach until the following morning.

Misoa was then anchored off the beachhead and acted as a "mother ship" to the numerous Motor Torpedo Boats and Motor Gun Boats operating off the beaches, providing accommodation, berths, and medical services. Later, she also provided a repair and maintenance service. By late October Misoa was stationed at Arromanches, until recalled in March 1945. She then sailed for Inveraray, Scotland, where she was decommissioned.

== Post-war ==
In 1946 the Misoa was owned and operated by the Panama Transport Company, Panama, and in 1953 was sold to the Creole Petroleum Corporation, also of Panama. In 1956 she was sold to Maritima Aragua S.A. of Maracaibo and renamed Petro-Mar, and the following year was sold again, to the Lennox Corporation of Monrovia and renamed Stanvac Riau. Finally, on 22 December 1962 she arrived in Hong Kong, where her scrapping began on 17 January 1963.
