= HMS Bachaquero =

Royal Navy tank landing ship of WW2

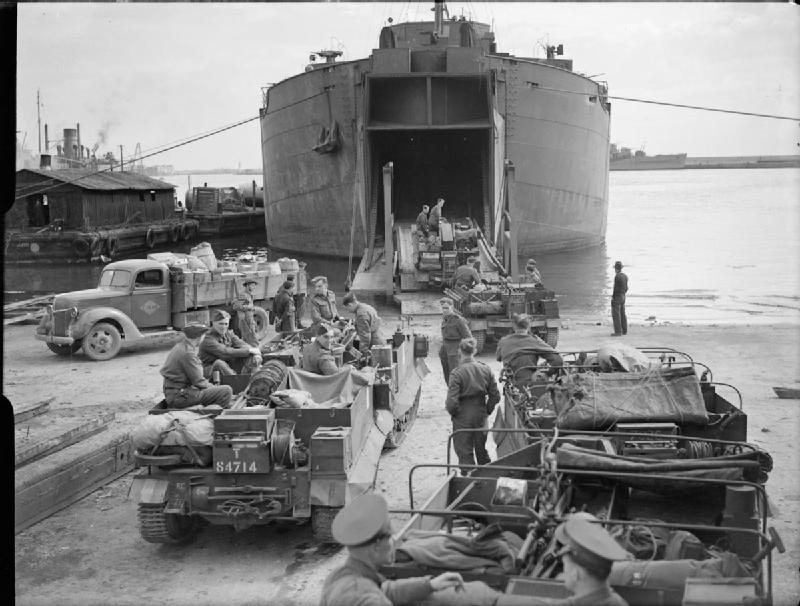
- HMS Bachaquero

History

United Kingdom
- Name: Bachaquero
- Builder: Furness Shipbuilding Company, Haverton Hill-on-Tees
- Laid down: 27 October 1936
- Launched: 7 May 1937
- Acquired: December 1940
- Commissioned: August 1941
- Decommissioned: 1945
- Identification: Pennant number: F110
- Fate: Returned to Merchant service, 1945; Scrapped 1960

General characteristics
- Type: Mark I LST
- Displacement: 4,193 tons
- Length: 379.4 ft (115.6 m)
- Beam: 64.2 ft (19.6 m)
- Draught: Fully laden : 15 ft (4.6 m) aft; 4 ft (1.2 m) forward
- Ramps: 100 ft (30 m) extending bow ramp
- Capacity: 18 × 30-ton tanks or 22 × 25-ton tanks or 33 heavy trucks
- Troops: 217
- Complement: 98
- Armament: 1 × single (from early 1944, twin) QF 2 pounder naval gun(s); 6 × single Oerlikon 20 mm cannon; 3 × Lewis guns; Smoke mortar

HMS Bachaquero (F110) was a Maracaibo-class Mark I landing ship, tank of the Royal Navy during World War II. A converted Lake Maracaibo oil tanker.

== Design ==
Bachaquero was one of three shallow-draught oil tankers built by the Furness Shipbuilding Company of Haverton Hill-on-Tees in 1937 to operate in Lake Maracaibo in Venezuela. She was requisitioned by the Royal Navy in December 1940, along with her sister ships Misoa and Tasajera, for conversion to a tank landing ship. Her oil tanks were removed to form a tank deck, and two large hatches and two 50-ton derrick cranes fitted to lift vehicles from the tank deck to the upper deck. Her bows were cut off square and a heavy steel door fitted. A hinged extension, together with the door, provided a 100-foot (30 m) ramp to unload vehicles. Steel armour plate was fitted to the bridge and wheelhouse, and the ship was armed with a single 40 mm gun, six 20 mm anti-aircraft guns, three Lewis machine guns, and a smoke mortar. There was accommodation for up to 217 troops, and for a crew of 98. She could carry eighteen 30-ton tanks, or twenty-two 25-ton tanks, or 33 heavy trucks. After refitting was complete she was commissioned in August 1941.

== History ==
=== North Africa and the Mediterranean ===
She was the world's first operational LST and the first British LST to engage in duties in World War II on 6 May 1942 while off Madagascar at Diégo Suarez during Operation Ironclad.

=== Normandy ===
She was off the neighbouring Sword beach when she was hit by an 88mm anti personnel shell but damage was slight and casualties few.

After the war she returned to merchant service and reverted to an oil tanker.
