= HMS Bruiser (F127) =

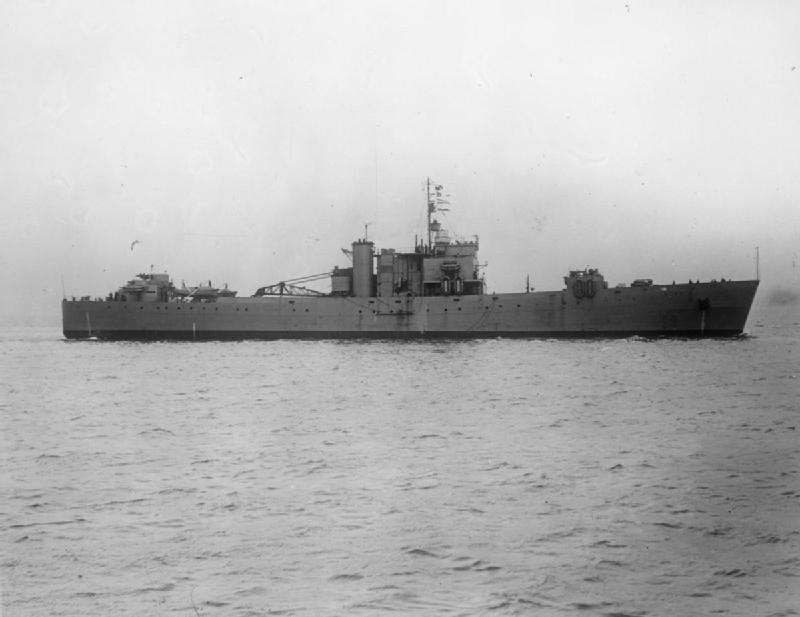
- HMS Bruiser

History

United Kingdom
- Name: HMS Bruiser
- Ordered: 6 March 1941
- Builder: Harland & Wolff
- Launched: 24 October 1942
- Completed: 2 April 1943
- Commissioned: 12 March 1943
- Out of service: 1946
- Identification: Pennant number: F127
- Fate: Sold for merchant service 1946. Scrapped 1968

General characteristics
- Type: Landing Ship, Tank Mark I
- Displacement: 3,620
- Speed: 18 knots laden to beaching draught; 16.5 knots at deep
- Capacity: 13 Churchill infantry tanks, 27 vehicles, 193 men
- Complement: 169

Service record
- Operations: Allied invasion of Italy; Normandy landings

HMS Bruiser was built as a Landing Ship, Tank (LST(1)) at Harland & Wolff. Launched in October 1942 and commissioned the following March, she saw service as part of the Allied invasion of Italy.

== Design and development ==
Bruiser was the second of the LST Mk.1 class ships, which could carry 13 Churchill tanks, 27 other vehicles and 193 men. It had a high speed even when laden for the assault (about 18 knots) but did not have a shallow draught, which meant that a 140 ft (43 m) long bow ramp had to be added and this took up a lot of room inside the ship.

Bruiser had only two sister ships, as plans to build more in the United States led instead to a simpler though slower design capable of similar capacity but with a much shallower draught.

== Service ==
Bruiser took part in the Salerno landing in 1943. In 1944, she was refitted as a fighter direction ship, for use during the Normandy landings in controlling fighter aircraft by ground-controlled interception. Later in 1944 she took British troops back into Athens in Greece. Bruiser was sold into merchant service in 1946.

== Merchant service ==
Bruiser was sold in 1946 for merchant service as Nilla. In 1951, she was converted to a cargo liner and renamed Silverstar. In 1957, she became Ciudad de Santa Fe and was broken up in Argentina in 1968.

== See also ==
- HMS Boxer
- HMS Thruster
