= HMS Thruster (F131) =

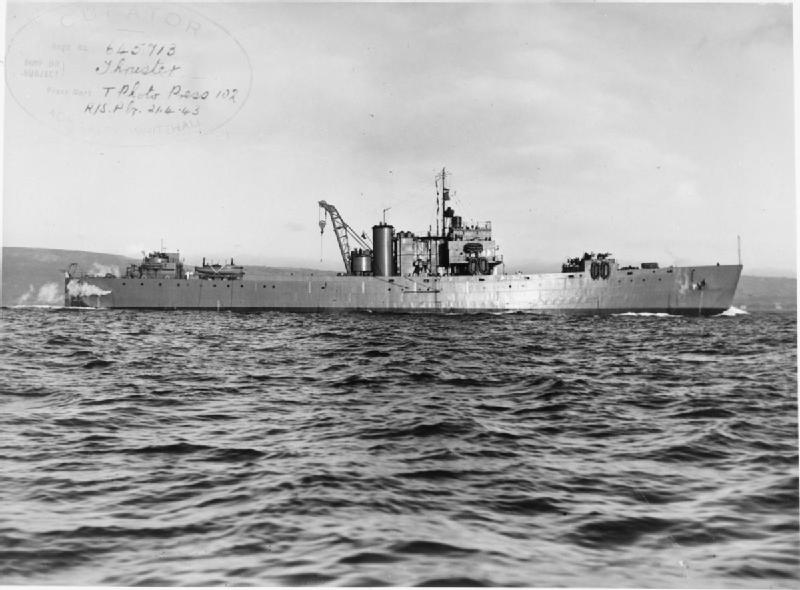
- HMS Thruster

History

United Kingdom
- Name: Thruster
- Ordered: 6 March 1941
- Builder: Harland and Wolff
- Laid down: 31 July 1941
- Launched: 24 September 1942
- Completed: 2 April 1943
- Commissioned: 28 January 1943
- Reclassified: Fighter direction ship, 1944
- Identification: Pennant number: F131
- Fate: Transferred to Royal Netherlands Navy, 1947

Netherlands
- Name: Pelikaan
- Acquired: 1947
- Identification: Pennant number: A 830
- Fate: Scrapped Bilbao 1973

General characteristics
- Type: Mark I LST
- Displacement: 3,620
- Speed: 18 knots laden to beaching draught; 16.5 knots at deep
- Capacity: 13 Churchill infantry tanks, 27 vehicles, 193 men
- Complement: 169

Service record
- Operations: Allied invasion of Italy; Normandy landings

HMS Thruster (F131) was a Mark I LST built by Harland and Wolff. Launched in September 1942 and commissioned the following March, she saw service as part of the Allied invasion of Italy.

== Design and development ==
Thruster was the third of the LST Mk.1 class ships which could carry 13 Churchill tanks, 27 other vehicles and 193 men. It had a high speed even when laden for the assault (about 18 knots) but did not have a shallow draught, which meant that a 140 ft (43 m) long bow ramp had to be added and this took up a lot of room inside the ship.

Bruiser had only two sister ships, as plans to build more in the United States led instead to a simpler though slower design capable of similar capacity but with a much shallower draught.

== Royal Navy service ==
Thruster took part in the Salerno landing in 1943. In 1944, she was refitted as a fighter direction ship, for use during the Normandy landings in controlling fighter aircraft by ground-controlled interception. Later in 1944 she took British troops back into Athens in Greece. Thruster was transferred to the Royal Netherlands Navy in 1947.

== Royal Netherlands service ==
She was acquired by the Royal Netherlands Navy in 1947 and renamed HNLMS Pelikaan with the hull number A 830.

== See also ==
- HMS Boxer
- HMS Bruiser
