= HMS Boxer (F121) =

1942 landing ship

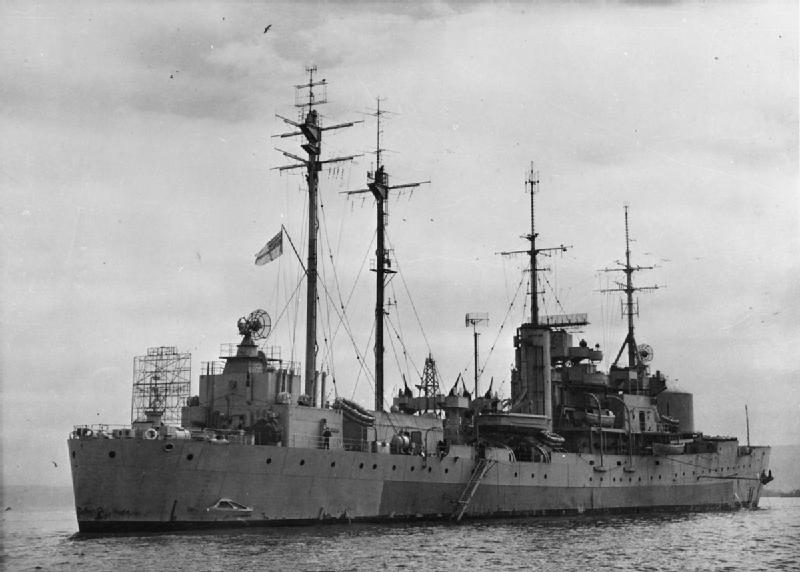
- HMS Boxer fitted out as a fighter direction ship

History

United Kingdom
- Name: HMS Boxer
- Ordered: 6 March 1941
- Builder: Harland & Wolff
- Yard number: 1155
- Launched: 12 December 1942
- Completed: 1 May 1943
- Commissioned: 10 April 1943
- Identification: Pennant number: F121
- Fate: Scrapped 1958

General characteristics
- Type: Landing Ship, Tank Mark I
- Displacement: 3,620
- Speed: 18 knots laden to beaching draught; 16.5 knots at deep
- Capacity: 13 Churchill infantry tanks, 27 vehicles, 193 men
- Complement: 169
- Sensors & processing systems: SM fire directional radar; SK-1 air-search radar

Service record
- Operations: Allied invasion of Italy; Normandy landings

HMS Boxer was built as a Landing Ship, Tank [LST(1)] at Harland & Wolff. Launched in December 1942 and commissioned the following April, she saw service as part of the Allied invasion of Italy and the Invasion of Normandy.

== Design and development ==
Boxer was the next in development of the tank landing ship following the conversion of the Maracaibo tankers into landing ships capable of carrying vehicles. The requirement was for a ship that could carry 13 Churchill tanks, 27 other vehicles and 193 men. As it was expected to have a high speed even when laden for the assault (about 18 knots) it could not have a shallow draught. This in turn meant that an extra long bow ramp had to be added. At 140 ft (43 m) this took up a lot of room inside the ship.

Boxer was laid down at Harland & Wolff's Belfast shipyard on 31 July 1941. She was launched on 12 December 1942 and was completed on 1 August 1943. Boxer had only two sister ships, as plans to build more in the United States led instead to the Landing Ship, Tank, a simpler though slower design capable of similar capacity but with a much shallower draught.

== Service ==
Boxer carried the writer, musician and comedian Spike Milligan from North Africa to Italy, when he served with the 56th Heavy Regiment Royal Artillery.

In 1944, she was refitted as a fighter direction ship, for use during the Normandy landings to control fighter aircraft by ground-controlled interception, then as an "action information organisation" tender (a radar training ship) in 1946. In 1953 she took part in the fleet review to celebrate the Coronation of Queen Elizabeth II, was placed in reserve in 1956 and scrapped at Barrow-in-Furness in 1958.

== See also ==
- HMS Bruiser
- HMS Thruster

== Bibliography ==
- Blackman, Raymond V. B., ed. (1953). Jane's Fighting Ships 1953–54. New York: McGraw-Hill Book Company. OCLC 473434104.
- McCluskie, Tom (2013). The Rise and Fall of Harland and Wolff. Stroud: The History Press. ISBN 978-0-75-248861-5.
- Milligan, Spike (1978). Hobbs, J. (ed.). Mussolini, His Part in My Downfall. Harmondsworth: Penguin. ISBN 0-14-005196-1.
