= Nalan =

Nalan may refer to:

- Nalan Kaygın (born 1993), Turkish female deaf badminton player
- Nalan Ramazanoğlu (born 1980), Turkish basketball player
- Nalan (singer) (Nalan Tokyürek), Turkish singer
- Nara clan, also known as Nalan clan (納蘭氏), a Jurchen and Manchu clan and surname, include:
  - Nalan Xingde (1655–1685), Qing dynasty Chinese poet
  - Miss Nalan, Qing dynasty poet and younger sister of Nalan Xingde
  - Nalan Mingzhu, an official of the Qing Dynasty
  - Nalan Minghui, a character in Qijian Xia Tianshan
- Nalan Cheel, a member of Figrin D'an and the Modal Nodes
- Nalan Kumarasamy, Indian film director

== See also ==
- Nala (disambiguation)
  - Nala (sometimes called Nalan), a character in Hindu mythology
