= Fatahillah-class corvette =

Class of Indonesian Navy corvettes

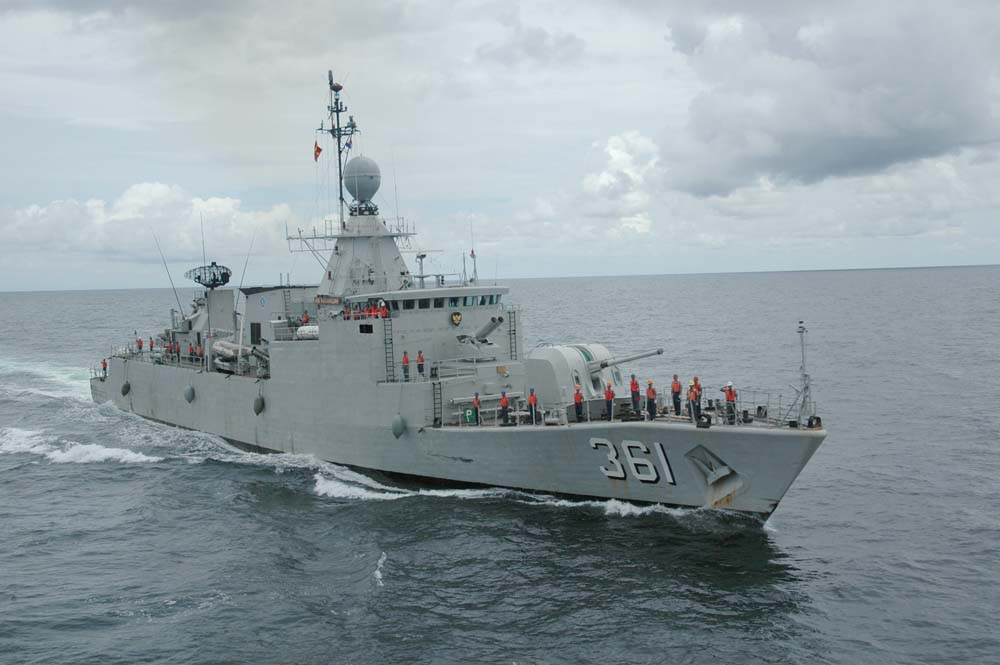
- KRI Fatahillah

Class overview
- Name: Fatahillah class
- Builders: Wilton-Fijenoord, Schiedam, Netherlands
- Operators: Indonesian Navy
- Preceded by: Albatros class
- Succeeded by: Diponegoro class
- Built: 1977–1980
- In commission: 1979–present
- Completed: 3
- Active: 3

General characteristics
- Type: Corvette
- Displacement: 1,200 long tons (1,200 t) standard; 1,450 long tons (1,470 t) full
- Length: 84 m (275 ft 7 in)
- Beam: 11.10 m (36 ft 5 in)
- Draught: 3.30 m (10 ft 10 in)
- Propulsion: Combined diesel or gas, 2 shafts; 1 × Rolls-Royce Olympus TM-3B gas turbine, 21,000 kW (28,000 shp) and; 2 × MTU 16V956 TB81 diesel engines, 6,000 bhp (4,500 kW)
- Speed: 30 knots (56 km/h)
- Range: 4,250 nautical miles (7,870 km) at 16 knots (30 km/h)
- Complement: 89
- Sensors & processing systems: Terma's SCANTER 4100 (in Fatahillah) or 6000 (in Malahayati)
- Armament: 1 × Bofors 120 mm L/46 gun; 1 × Bofors 40 mm L/70 gun (2 × in Nala); 2 × Rheinmetall Rh-202 20 mm guns; 4 × Exocet MM 38 anti-ship missiles (the missiles might be removed due to obsolete); 2 × triple Mk 32 launchers for 324 mm torpedoes (none in Nala)
- Aircraft carried: 1 × helicopter (in Nala)
- Aviation facilities: Flight deck and telescopic hangar (in Nala)

The Fatahillah class is a class of corvette that in service in Indonesian Navy. The vessels of the class were built by Wilton-Fijenoord, Schiedam, Netherlands. There are three ships in the class and are still active.

== Design ==
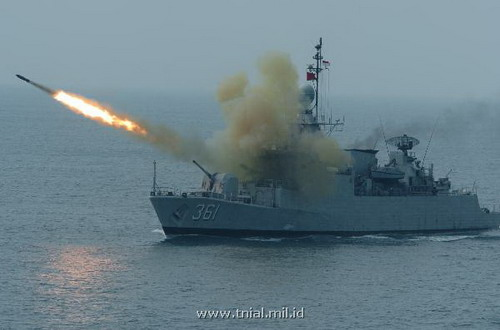
KRI Fatahillah (361) firing her Bofors anti-submarine rocket

Fatahillah class has a length of 84 m (276 ft), a beam of 11.10 m (36.4 ft), a draught of 3.3 m (11 ft) and displacement of 1,200 long tons (1,200 t) standard and 1,450 long tons (1,470 t) at full load. The class has two shafts and powered with CODOG-type propulsion, which consisted of one Rolls-Royce Olympus TM-3B gas turbine with 21,000 kW (28,000 shp) and two MTU 16V956 TB81 diesel engines with 6,000 bhp (4,500 kW). The class has a range of 4,250 nautical miles (7,870 km) while cruising at 16 knots (30 km/h) and top speed of 30 knots (56 km/h). Fatahillah class has a complement of 89 personnel, including 11 officers.

The class are armed with one Bofors 120 mm Automatic Gun L/46, one Bofors 40 mm Automatic Gun L/70, two Rheinmetall Mk 20 Rh-202 autocannons. For anti-submarine warfare, the class are equipped with one Bofors 375 mm twin anti-submarine rocket launcher and two triple Mk 32 324 mm torpedo launchers. For surface warfare, Fatahillah class was equipped with four Exocet MM 38 anti-ship missile launchers. Due to obsolescence, the ships never carried the missiles since early 2000s.

The third ship, KRI Nala, has a flight deck and telescopic hangar astern and able to carry a single helicopter. The ship also has two Bofors 40 mm guns instead of only a single gun and not equipped with torpedo launchers.

The ships countermeasure systems consisted of two Vickers Mk 4 chaff launchers and T-Mk 6 torpedo decoy outfit. As built, the electronics and sensors consisted of HSA DA-05 air and surface surveillance radar, Decca AC 1229 surface warning radar, HSA WM-28 tracking radar, Van der Heem PHS 32 sonar and WCS WM20 fire-control system. As of 2009, some of them were replaced or upgraded, which were consisted of two Knebworth Corvus 8-tubed trainable chaff launchers, ECM MEL Susie-1 and Signaal LIROD fire-control system.

Fatahillah and Malahayati received and completed mid-life upgrades in 2016 and 2020, respectively. The upgrades consisted of Terma SCANTER 4100 (in Fatahillah) or 6000 (in Malahayati) air and surface surveillance radar and new IFF systems amongst others.

== Notable deployments ==
KRI Fatahillah was part of a team of several Indonesian and one US Navy vessels searching for the missing Adam Air Flight 574. The vessel located several unidentified metal objects which may have been part of the missing plane.

KRI Nala was also deployed to help search for the missing Adam Air Flight 574.

Fatahillah and Malahayati, along with twelve other Indonesian Navy ships, were deployed in waters off Nusa Dua, Bali to patrol the area during 2022 G20 Bali summit on 15–16 November 2022.

== List of ships ==
Ships	Pennant number	Builder	Launched	Status
KRI Fatahillah	361	Wilton-Fijenoord, Schiedam, Netherlands	22 December 1977	In active service
KRI Malahayati	362	Wilton-Fijenoord, Schiedam, Netherlands	19 June 1978	In active service
KRI Nala	363	Wilton-Fijenoord, Schiedam, Netherlands	11 January 1979	In active service

== See also ==
- Bung Tomo-class corvette
- Diponegoro-class corvette
