= Damayanti (disambiguation) =

Damayanti (Sanskrit: दमयंती) is a character in a love story found in the Vana Parva book of the ancient Indian epic Mahabharata.

Damayanti or Damayanthi may also refer to:

- Nala and Damayanti, the episode in the epic, concerning the love story between Damayanti and the king Nala
- Damayanti (given name), an Indian feminine given name
- Damyanthi (film), a 2019 Indian Kannada-language film
- Damayanti (web series), a 2020 Indian Bengali-language web series
- Damayanti (horse), an Indonesian racehorse

== See also ==
- Nala Damayanthi (disambiguation)
  - Nala Damayanthi (1959 film), an Indian Tamil-language film by Kemparaj
  - Nala Damayanthi (2003 film), an Indian Tamil-language film directed by Mouli
