= Nala (disambiguation) =

Nala is a king in Hindu mythology who features in the ancient Indian epic Mahabharata.

Nala may also refer to:

== Places ==
- Nala, Nepal, a region
- Nala, Pakistan, a village
- Nala Local Municipality, an administrative area in Free State, South Africa
- Nala (Tanzanian ward), an administrative ward in Dodoma Region
- Nala River, Vanua Levu, Fiji
- Nala block, community development block in Jamtara district, Jharkhand, India
  - Nala, Jamtara, village in Jharkhand, India
- Nala (Vidhan Sabha constituency), an assembly constituency in the Indian state of Jharkhand
- NALA, a country grouping for North America and Latin America

== People ==
- Nala Damajanti (fl. 1864–1894), stage name of a snake charmer who toured with P. T. Barnum and performed at the Folies Bergère
- Nala dynasty of east-central India in the 6th century
- Nara clan, also known as Nala in Chinese, a Manchu clan and surname

== Other uses ==
- Nullah, a South Asian term for watercourse or drainage trench
- Nala (Ramayana), a monkey in Hindu mythology
- Nala (The Lion King), a character in Disney's The Lion King franchise
- KRI Nala (363), an Indonesian naval vessel
- NALA Films, a film production company
- Nala, a genus of earwigs in family Labiduridae

== See also ==
- Nal (disambiguation)
- Naal (disambiguation)
- Nala Damayanthi (disambiguation)
  - Nala and Damayanti, an episode in the epic, concerning the love story between king Nala and Damayanti
- Nalan (disambiguation)
- Nalas, a village in West Azerbaijan Province, Iran
