= NAL =

NAL or Nal may refer to:

== Places ==
- Nal, Balochistan, a town in Balochistan, Pakistan
- Nal Tehsil, an administrative area in Pakistan

== Organizations ==
- Nal Sarovar Bird Sanctuary, in India
- National Aerospace Laboratories, India
- National Aerospace Laboratory of Japan
- National Alliance of Liberals, a political party in Ghana
- United States National Agricultural Library
- New American Library, a publisher
- New Asia Library, a university library at the Chinese University of Hong Kong
- Nintendo Australia, a publisher and distributor of video games to Oceania

== Sports ==
- National Adult League, a fourth-tier U.S. soccer league
- National Arena League, a professional indoor football league
- Negro American League, a professional baseball Negro league
- North American League (baseball), a professional baseball minor league

== Transportation ==
- Nal Airport, in Rajasthan, India
- Nalchik Airport (IATA code)
- Norwegian America Line, a ship line
- Nakanihon Airlines, a Japanese airline that became Air Central
- North Auckland Line, a railway line in New Zealand

== Technology ==
- Network Abstraction Layer in MPEG video codecs
- Network Access License, a certification for telecommunication equipment for the Chinese market
- Novell Application Launcher, now Novell ZENworks

== Other uses ==
- Nál or Laufey, a goddess in Norse mythology

== See also ==
- Nala (disambiguation)
- Naal (disambiguation)
