= KRI Fatahillah =

Indonesian Navy corvette (built 1977)

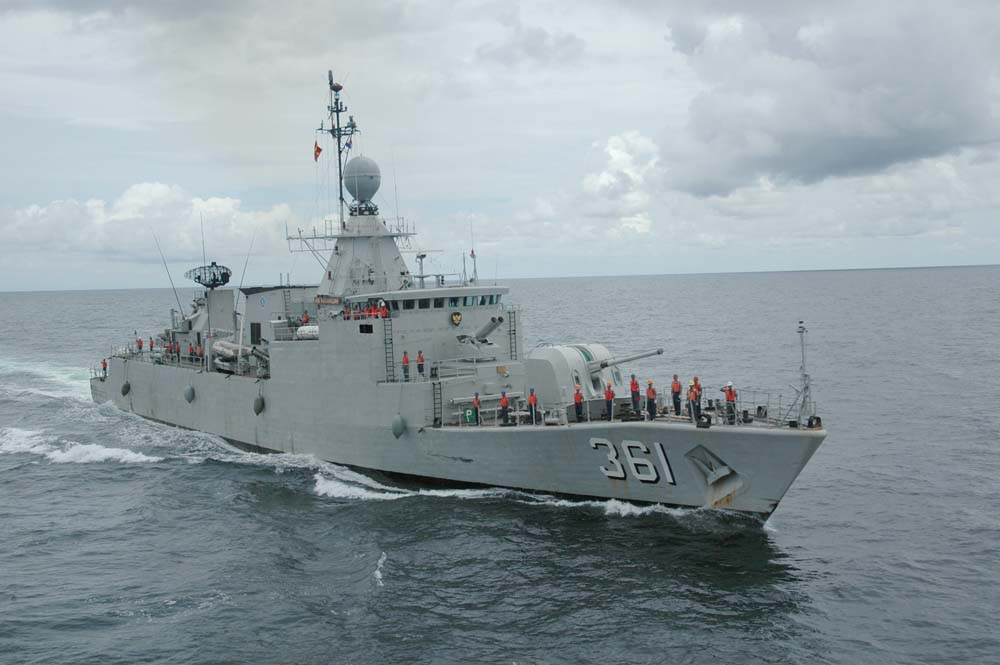
- KRI Fatahillah before mid-life modernization

History

Indonesia
- Name: KRI Fatahillah (361)
- Namesake: Fatahillah
- Builder: Wilton-Fijenoord, Schiedam, Netherlands
- Laid down: 31 January 1977
- Launched: 22 December 1977
- Commissioned: 16 July 1979
- Home port: Sorong
- Identification: Pennant number: 361
- Status: In active service

General characteristics
- Class & type: Fatahillah-class corvette
- Displacement: 1,200 long tons (1,200 t) standard; 1,450 long tons (1,470 t) full
- Length: 84 m (275 ft 7 in)
- Beam: 11.10 m (36 ft 5 in)
- Propulsion: CODAD
- Speed: 30 knots (56 km/h)
- Range: 3,300 km (1,780 nmi)
- Complement: 89
- Sensors & processing systems: Search radar: Terma SCANTER 4100; Fire control system: 2 × Ultra Electronics Series 2500 EO Director; Sonar: Signaal PHS-32 Hull-mounted Sonar; IFF system: Tellumat PT-2500 naval IFF system; ESM system: Thales Vigile 100; Decoy & Countermeasure system: 2 × 8-barrelled Knebworth-Corvus countermeasures launchers; 1 × T-Mk 6 Fanfare towed sonar decoy; Combat management system: Ultra Electronics OSIRIS Combat Management System
- Armament: 1 × Bofors 120 mm/46 TAK120 automatic gun; 1 × Bofors SAK40/L70-350 AFD 40 mm anti-aircraft gun; 2 × Yugoimport-SDPR M71/08 20mm autocannon; 1 × Bofors SR375A 375 mm twin tube anti-submarine rocket launcher; 2 × Mk 32 triple torpedo launcher for Mark 46 or WASS A244-S lightweight torpedo
- Notes: The Mid-Life Modernization programs include replacing the ship propulsion from CODOG to CODAD, also the removal of Signaal DA05 radar and MM38 Exocet missile

KRI Fatahillah (361) is an Indonesian Navy ship named after Fatahillah, a national war heroic figure who recaptured Sunda Kelapa from the Portuguese and consequently changed its name to Jayakarta. KRI Fatahillah is a missile-equipped corvette, the first ship of Fatahillah-class corvette.

== Design ==
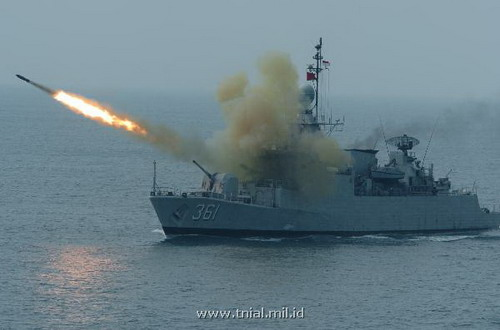
KRI Fatahillah (361) firing an ASROC

Fatahillah has a length of 84 m (276 ft), a beam of 11.10 m (36.4 ft), a draught of 3.3 m (11 ft) and displacement of 1,200 long tons (1,200 t) standard and 1,450 long tons (1,470 t) at full load. The ship has two shafts and was powered with CODOG-type propulsion, which were consisted of one Rolls-Royce Olympus TM-3B gas turbine with 21,000 kW (28,000 shp) and two MTU 16V956 TB81 diesel engines with 6,000 bhp (4,500 kW). The ship has a top speed of 30 knots (56 km/h). Fatahillah has a complement of 89 personnel, including 11 officers.

=== Mid-Life upgrade ===
Ultra Electronics (Ultra CCS) was awarded a contract as the prime contractor for the mid-life upgrade of KRI Fatahillah in 2013 which includes replacement of the Combat Management System and sensors, re-powering and general overhaul, this USD50M contract is due to complete with ship handover back to the Navy in 2016. This upgrade included replacement of the WM-25 fire control radar with the installation of SCANTER 4100 and the installation of the Ultra Electronics Command and Control system. Tellumat Defence & Security also provided the PT-2500 naval IFF system to Ultra Electronics for the mid-life upgrade.

In December 2016, PT. Dok dan Perkapalan Surabaya hand over the completed ship to Indonesian Ministry of Defense at their yard in Surabaya.

== Service history ==
Fatahillah was laid down on 31 January 1977 at Wilton-Fijenoord, Schiedam, Netherlands. The ship was launched on 22 December 1977 and was commissioned on 16 July 1979.

The ship was part of a team of several Indonesian and one US Navy vessels searching for the missing Adam Air Flight 574. It located several unidentified metal objects which may have been part of the missing plane.

Fatahillah, along with Malahayati, Sultan Nuku, Sultan Hasanuddin, Sultan Iskandar Muda, Raden Eddy Martadinata, I Gusti Ngurah Rai, Abdul Halim Perdanakusuma, Karel Satsuitubun, dr. Wahidin Sudirohusodo, Surabaya, Teluk Banten, Tarakan and Bima Suci were deployed in waters off Nusa Dua, Bali to patrol the area during 2022 G20 Bali summit on 15–16 November 2022.
