= Nala Damayanti (disambiguation) =

Nala Damayanti is an episode in the epic Mahabharata. It may also refer to:

- Nala and Damayanti, the main characters from the episode
- Nala Damayanthi (1959 film), an Indian Tamil-language film directed by Kemparaj
- Nala Damayanthi (2003 film), an Indian Tamil-language film directed by Mouli
- Nala Damayanthi (TV series), a 2023 Indian Tamil-language television series
- Nala Damajanti, stage name (after the characters in the Mahabharatha) of a French circus performer

== See also ==
- Nala (disambiguation)
- Damayanti (disambiguation)
