= Naal =

Naal may refer to:

- Naal (film), a 2018 Indian Marathi-language film by Sudhakar Reddy Yakkanti
- Naal 2, its 2023 sequel
- Natalis of Ulster, Irish saint
- Naal, percussion instrument also called dholak

== See also ==
- Nal (disambiguation)
- Nala (disambiguation)
