= Bofors 120 mm Automatic Gun L/46 =

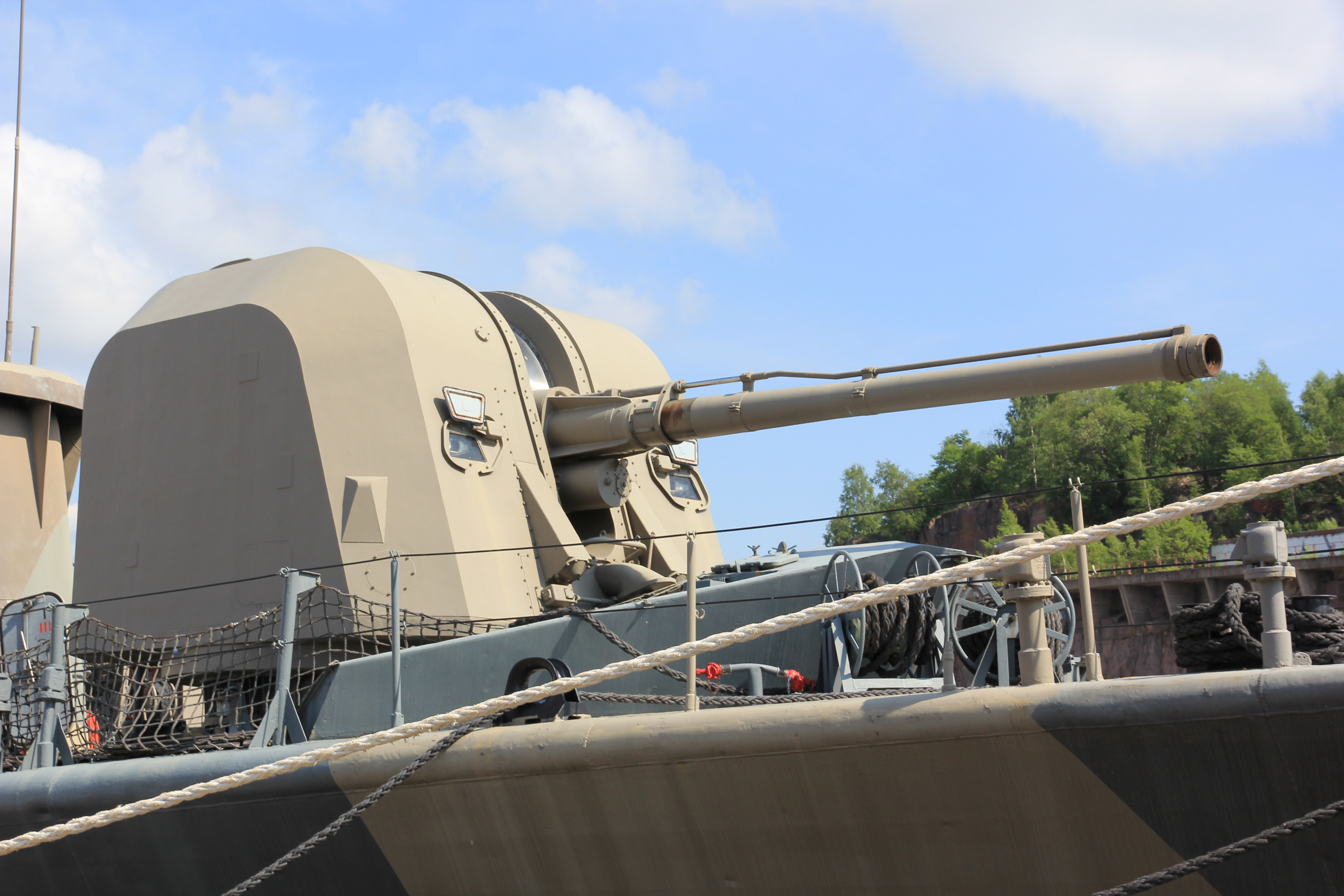
- Bofors 120 mm TAK 120 on Finnish Turunmaa-class gunboat
- Type: Anti-aircraft autocannon
- Place of origin: Sweden

Service history
- In service: 1960–1973 (FAK120); 1968–present (TAK120)
- Used by: FAK 120: Swedish Army; TAK 120: Finnish Navy; Indonesian Navy

Production history
- Designer: AB Bofors
- Designed: 1963–1967
- Manufacturer: AB Bofors
- No. built: FAK 120: 1 built TAK 120: 6 built
- Variants: FAK 120; TAK 120

Specifications
- Mass: FAK 120: 23 t (51,000 lb); TAK 120: 28 t (62,000 lb)
- Barrel length: 5,520 mm (217 in) (with breech)
- Height: FAK 120 height of fire: 1,950 mm (77 in)
- Shell: 120 × 615 mm R Bofors
- Shell weight: Complete cartridge: 33.7 kg (74 lb); High-Explosive shell: 21 kg (46 lb); Explosive charge: 3.2 kg (7.1 lb); Propellant charge: 5.5 kg (12 lb)
- Caliber: 120 mm
- Barrels: 1 × liquid-cooled
- Recoil: 47 cm (19 in) nominal
- Elevation: FAK 120: -5°/+85°, 25°/s TAK 120: -10°/+80°, 32°/s, acc 40°/s squared
- Traverse: FAK 120: 360°, 32°/s TAK 120: 360°, 40°/s, acc 50°/s squared
- Rate of fire: 75–80 rounds/min
- Muzzle velocity: 810 m/s (2,700 ft/s)
- Effective firing range: 8.0 seconds to 5,000 m 21.7 seconds to 10,000 m
- Maximum firing range: 18,500 m at 45°
- Feed system: 52 rounds in feed system
- References: navweaps.com, tdf.chalmers.se, fromtheswedisharchives.wordpress.com

Bofors 120 mm Automatic Gun L/46 (120/46), most commonly referred to as either Bofors FAK 120 or Bofors TAK 120 depending on the configuration (field gun vs naval gun), was a Swedish liquid-cooled single-barreled 120 mm (4.7 in) caliber long-range anti-aircraft autocannon designed by Bofors during the 1950s for indigenous use and export.

It was produced in two different variants during the 1950s and 1960s respectively, a field variant and a naval variant, and the latter still being in service today with the Indonesian Navy.

== Bofors FAK 120 ==
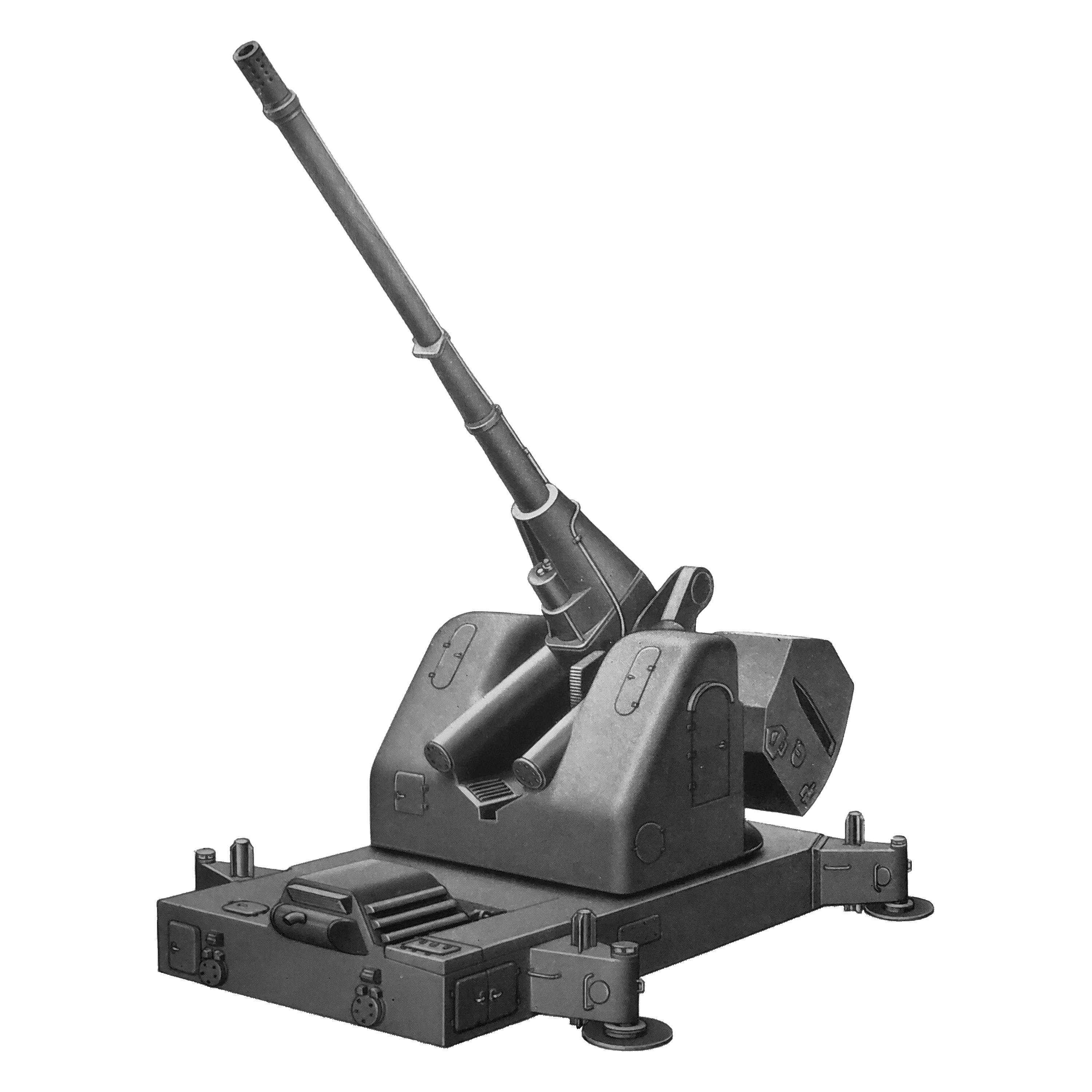
Bofors FAK 120 in firing mode.

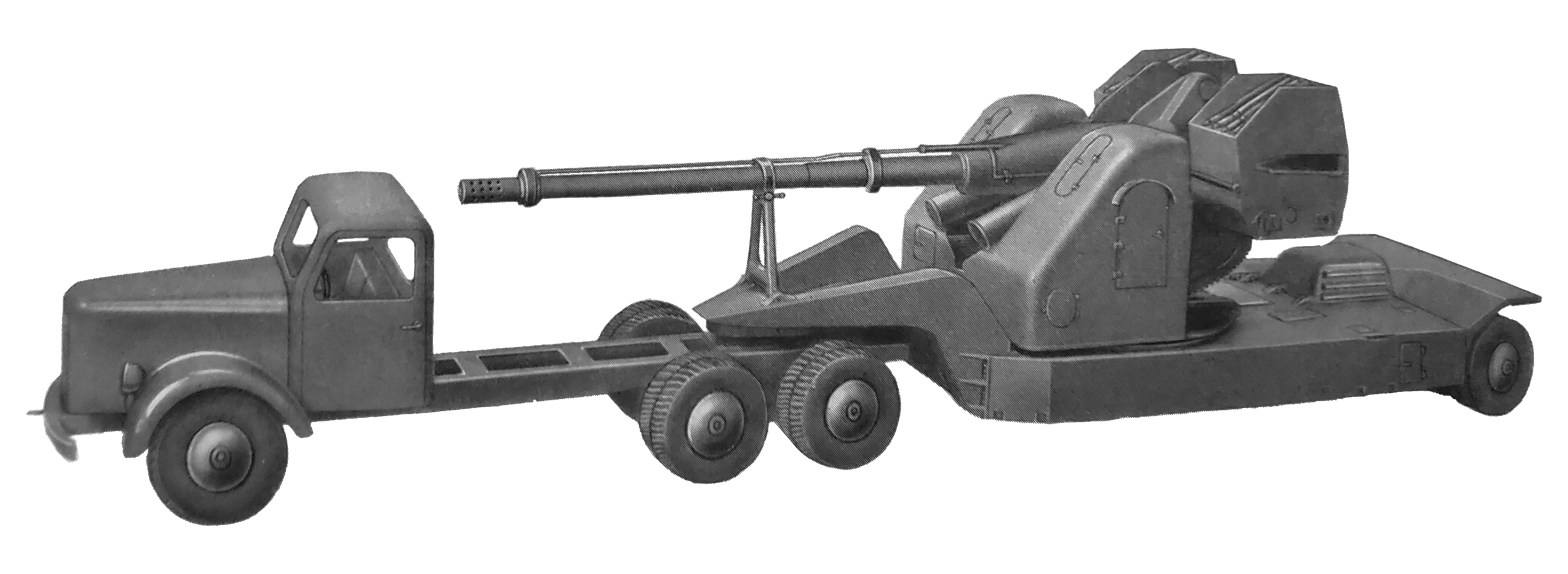
Bofors FAK 120 in transport mode.

The initial model was a field variant, sold as 120 mm Automatic Gun L/46 On Field Carriage, or Bofors 120 mm Automatic A.A. (Anti-Air) Field Gun L/46, but most commonly known as the FAK 120 (Swedish: fältautomatkanon, "Field Automatic Gun"). During development it was initially known as the FAK 120 X 51, later FAK 120 X 53, the latter segment meaning experimental model of 1951/1953. It was developed during the 1950s to meet a request from the Swedish Army for a new long range anti-aircraft gun capable of engaging aircraft at high altitude with a high rate of fire. This request lead to a 120 mm (4.7 in) caliber fully automatic medium-high velocity gun with a high capacity magazine and a high rate of fire, mounted on a field carriage.

The initial plan was to acquire 6 guns for trial, only one prototype was produced. The prototype was designated 12 cm luftvärnsautomatkanon försöksmodell 1 (12 cm lvakan fm 1), meaning 12 cm automatic anti-aircraft gun trial-model 1. During trials the gun showed great performance but the advent of anti-aircraft missiles at the end of the 1950s meant that the project was a dead end and no more guns were ordered. Despite this the prototype was put into service as the 12 cm luftvärnsautomatkanon 4501 (12 cm lvakan 4501) and would see service with the Swedish air defense from 1960 to 1973 before being retired.

=== FAK 120 technical description ===
The FAK 120 gun had a liquid-cooled gun barrel with exchangeable liner and a petrol-engine driven electro-hydraulic laying machinery for remote control. Hand-laying with cranks was also an option. The turret had space for two crew to aim the gun. The gun with magazines was mounted in an oscillating mount in between two covered gunner housings protected by 4 mm (0.16 in) of steel armor. The elevating mass was fitted with two separate magazines instead of a single one. The total ammunition capacity for both the gun and magazines was 52 shells and the automatic rate of fire was around 75 to 80 rounds per minute.

The field mount was designed to be converted to a trailer by connecting a back and front part equipped with wheels and truck mount respectively. The wheel base was 5,790 mm (228 in) and the wheel track was 2,730 mm (107 in). Ground clearance was 395 mm (15.6 in).

== Bofors TAK 120 ==
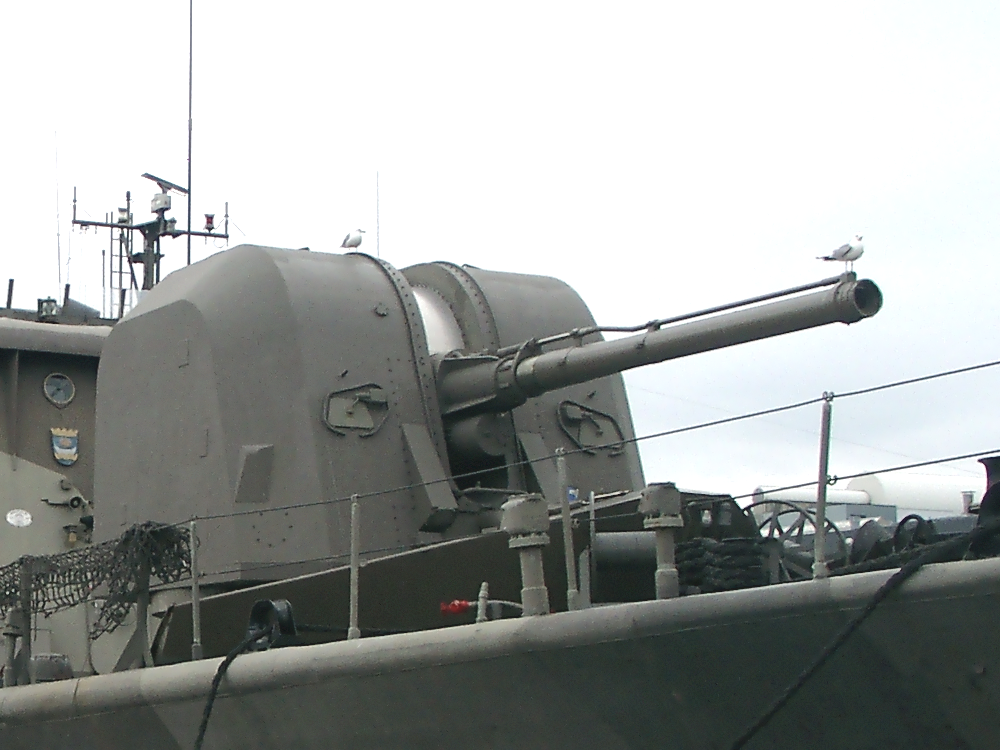
Bofors TAK 120 turret.

The 120 mm Automatic Gun L/46 In Turret Mounting, most commonly known as the TAK 120, was a 1960s navalized version of the Bofors FAK 120 field gun design from 1953. The name TAK 120 means Turret Automatic Gun 120 mm (Swedish: Tornautomatkanon 120 mm).

The Bofors TAK 120 was a private export venture to quickly develop a modern gun system intended for large Fast Attack Craft (FAC). To achieve this Bofors decided to simply do a navalized version of their 120 mm Automatic Field Gun L/46 (FAK 120). As part of the navalization process, the TAK 120 gun was fitted into an enclosed gun turret, replacing the more open oscillating system used on the FAK 120 field gun. Due to the enclosed turret, the magazine capacity was slightly decreased. The elevation mechanism was also shifted by 5° degrees downwards to increase the maximum gun depression from -5° to -10°, but at the cost of maximum elevation, going from +85° to +80°.

The Bofors TAK 120 never saw massive success on the export market but was exported to both the Finnish Navy and Indonesian Navy and it is still in service today with the latter.

=== Ships fitted with the Bofors TAK 120 ===
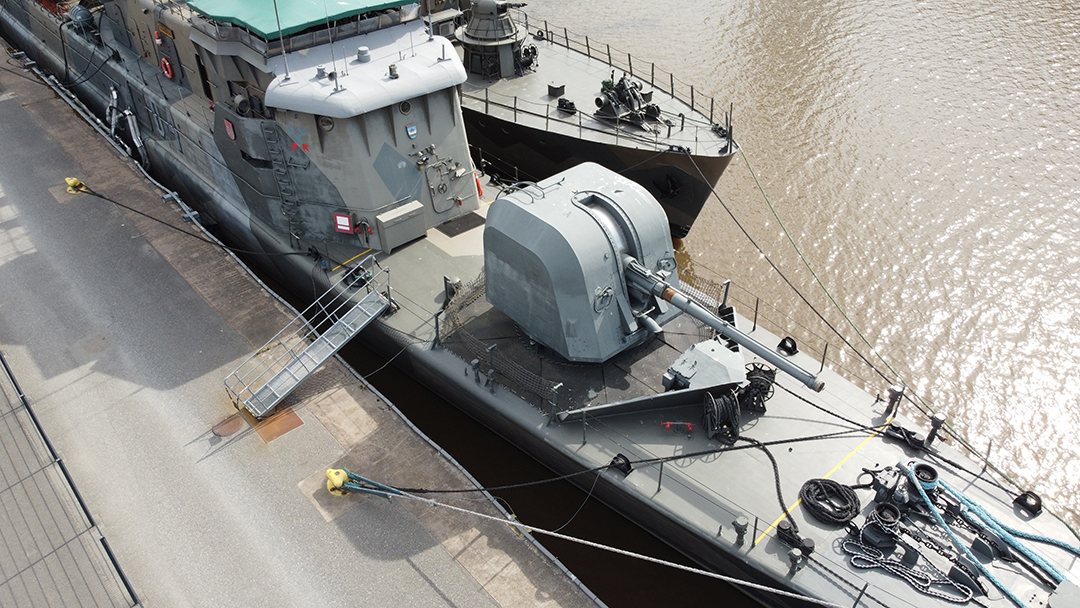
Turunmaa-class gunboat Karjala (04) with TAK 120.

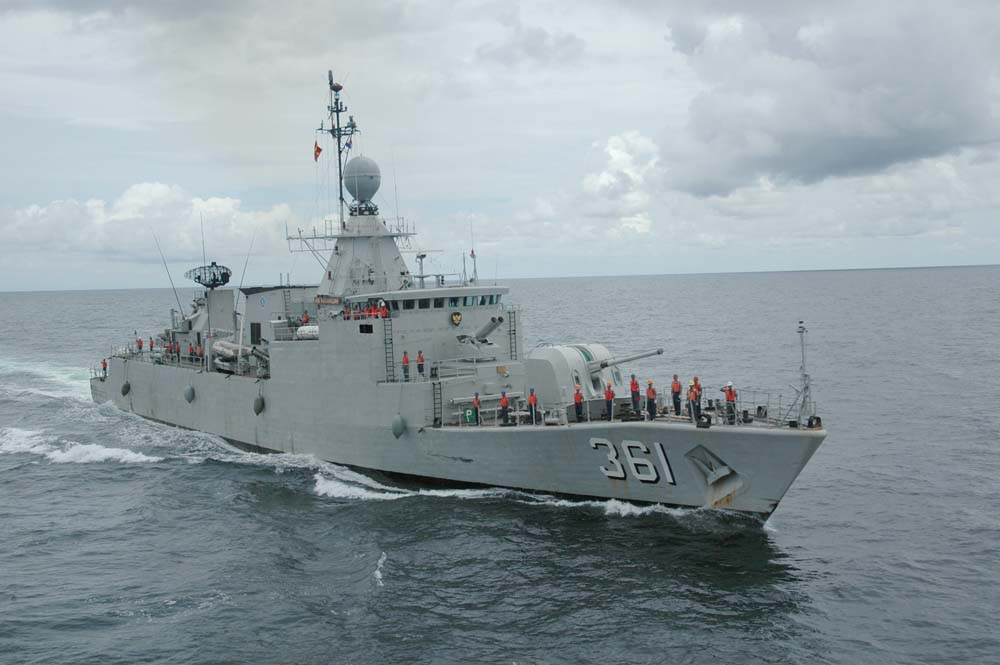
KRI Fatahillah (361) with TAK 120.

Finnish Navy

- Turunmaa-class gunboat:

- Turunmaa (03)
- Karjala (04)

- Finnish minelayer Pohjanmaa (replaced with Bofors 57 mm Naval Automatic Gun L/70 Mk1 1996–98)

Indonesian Navy

- Fatahillah-class corvette:

- KRI Fatahillah (361)
- KRI Malahayati (362)
- KRI Nala (363)

== Ammunition ==
The Bofors 120/46 fired a 120 × 615 mm R cartridge. Its main ammunition was conventional proximity fuzed high explosive (HE-PF), but Bofors also developed sub-caliber such for greater velocity and range.

- Designation
  - Cartridge – 12 cm skarp patron m/61 (12 cm sk ptr m/61), "12 cm live cartridge model 1961"
  - Charge – laddning m/61 (lng m/61), "charge model 1961"
  - Projectile – spränggranat m/61 (sgr m/61), "high explosive shell model 1961"
  - Fuze – zonanslagsrör m/52 luftvärn 12 cm (zonar m/52 LV 12 cm), "proximity contact fuze model 1952 anti-air 12 cm"
- Propellant
  - Propellant type – NK 976 4,5/1,5x 460
  - Weight – 5.5 kg (12 lb)
  - Velocity – 810 m/s (2,700 ft/s)
  - Max pressure – 2,500 bar (250,000 kPa)
  - Initial charge – 120 g (4.2 oz)
  - Copper fouling remover – 15 g (0.53 oz) tinfoil
- Projectile
  - Weight (complete) – 21 kg (46 lb)
  - Bursting charge – 3,123 g (110.2 oz) TNT
  - Initiation charge – 27 g (0.95 oz) hexotol
Ammunition illustration in Swedish Army catalogues

Ammunition data according to the Swedish Army

== See also ==
- Bofors 120 mm Naval Automatic Gun L/50
