= German submarine UD-3 =

German World War II submarine

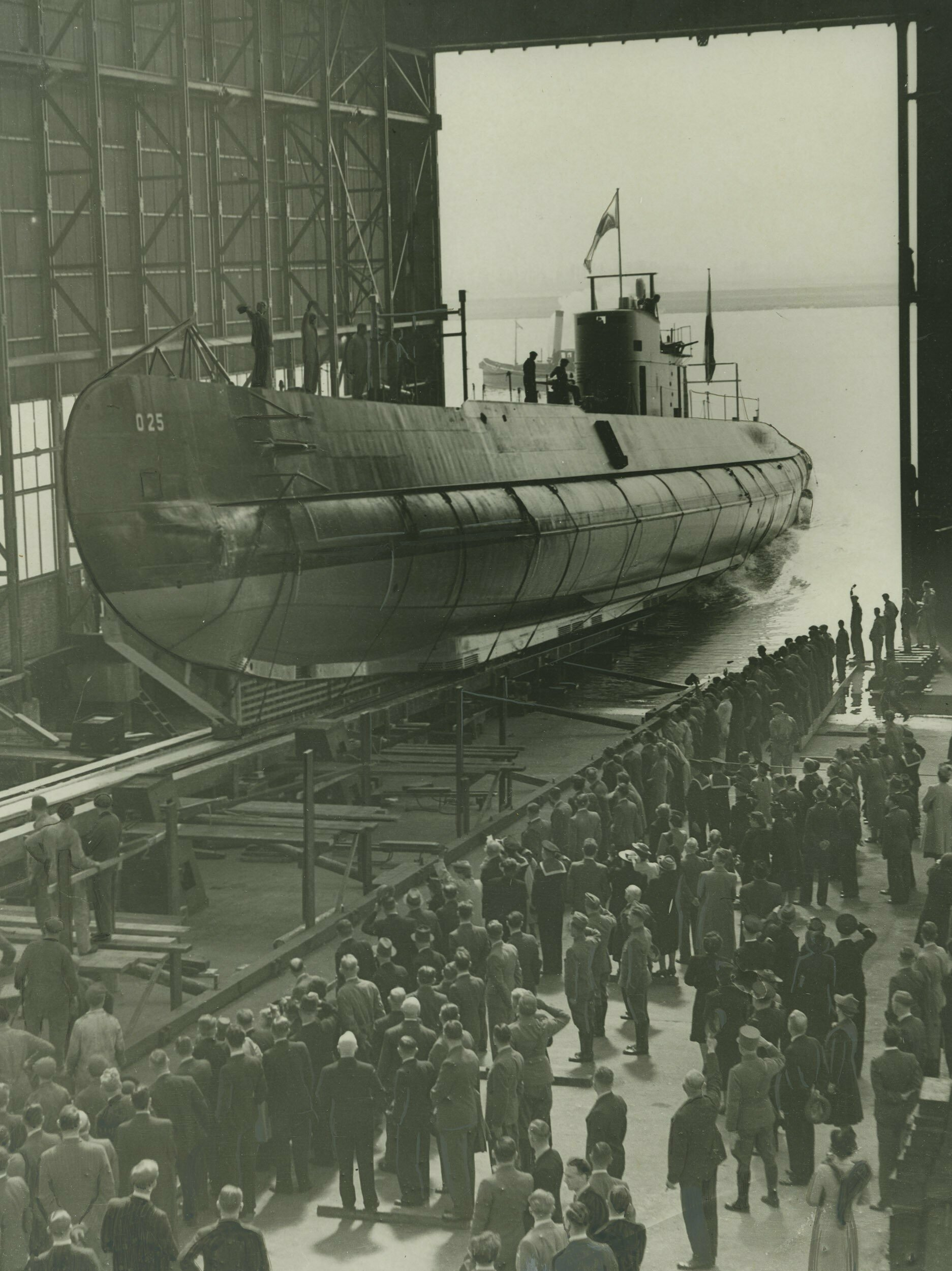
- Launch of O 25 in May 1940

History

Netherlands
- Name: HNLMS O 25
- Ordered: 28 June 1938
- Builder: Wilton-Fijenoord, Rotterdam
- Laid down: 10 April 1939
- Launched: 1 May 1940
- Fate: Incomplete, scuttled, later raised by German

Nazi Germany
- Name: UD-3
- Commissioned: 8 June 1941
- Decommissioned: 13 October 1944
- Fate: Scuttled on 3 May 1945

General characteristics
- Class & type: O 21-class submarine
- Displacement: 990 tons surfaced; 1205 tons submerged
- Length: 77.70 m (254 ft 11 in)
- Beam: 6.80 m (22 ft 4 in)
- Draught: 3.95 m (13 ft 0 in)
- Propulsion: 2 × 2,500 PS (2,466 bhp; 1,839 kW) diesel engines; 2 × 500 PS (493 bhp; 368 kW) electric motors
- Speed: 19.5 knots (36.1 km/h; 22.4 mph) surfaced; 9 knots (17 km/h; 10 mph) submerged
- Range: 10,000 nmi (19,000 km; 12,000 mi) at 12 knots (22 km/h; 14 mph) surfaced; 28 nmi (52 km; 32 mi) at 8.5 knots (15.7 km/h; 9.8 mph) submerged
- Complement: 39
- Armament: 4 × 21 in (533 mm) bow torpedo tubes; 2 × 21 in stern torpedo tubes; 2 × 21 in (1×2) external-traversing TT amidships

Service record as UD-3
- Part of: 3rd U-boat Flotilla; June – July 1941; 5th U-boat Flotilla; July – August 1941; 2nd U-boat Flotilla; August 1941 – September 1942; 10th U-boat Flotilla; October 1942 – February 1943; U-boat Defense School; March 1943 – October 1944
- Identification codes: M 38 047
- Commanders: K.Kapt. / F.Kapt. Hermann Rigele; 8 June 1941 – 23 October 1943; Oblt.z.S. Joachim Seeger; 24 October 1943 – 13 October 1944
- Operations: 3 patrols
- Victories: 1 merchant ship sunk (5,041 GRT)

UD-3 was an O 21-class submarine. The boat was laid down as the Dutch submarine HNLMS K XXV and renamed HNLMS O 25 but was captured during the German invasion of the Netherlands in World War II and commissioned in the Kriegsmarine.

== Ship history ==
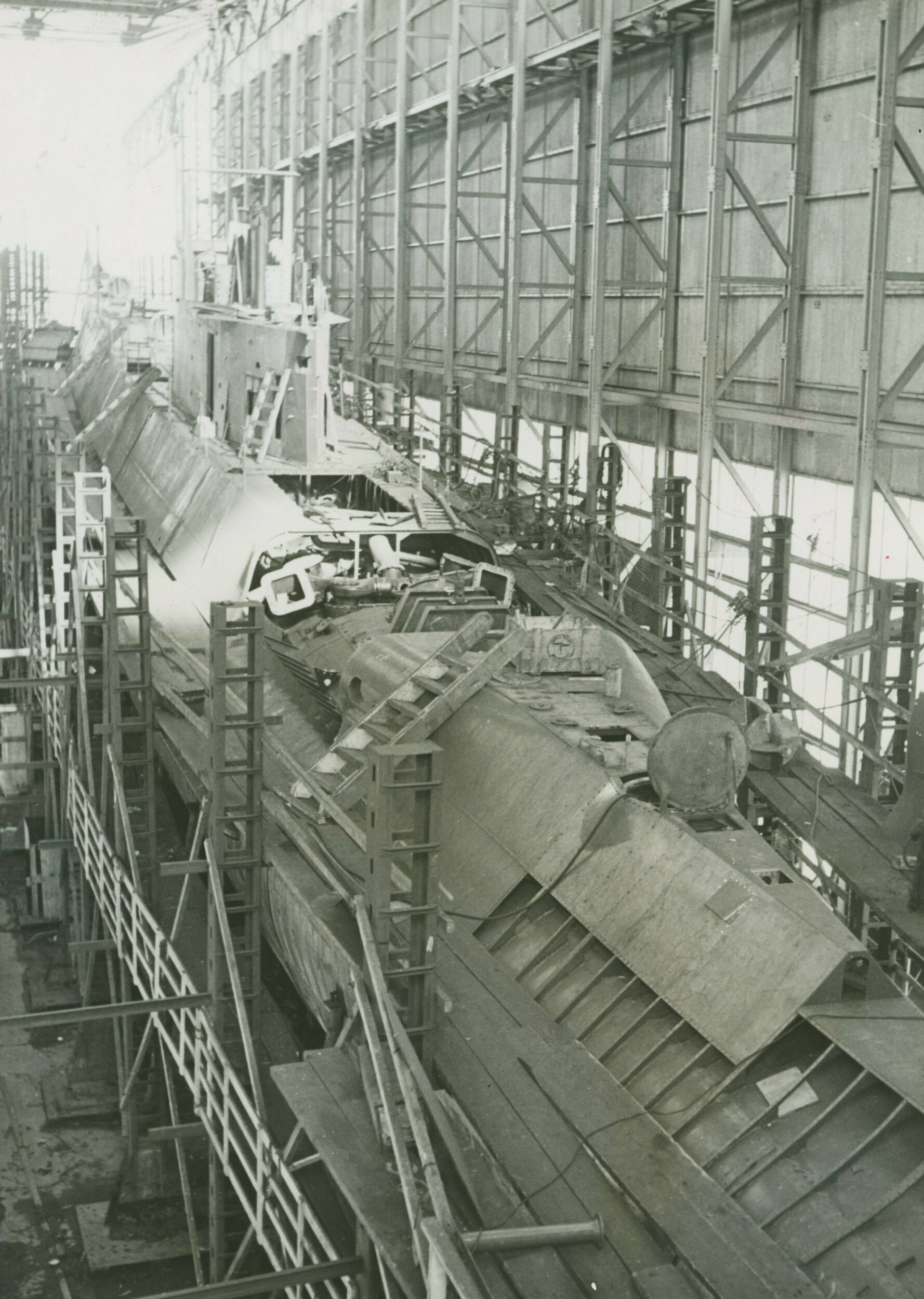
O 25 under construction in March 1940

The submarine was ordered on 28 June 1938 and laid down on 10 April 1939 as K XXV at the Wilton-Fijenoord, Rotterdam. During construction she was renamed O 25, and was finally launched on 1 May 1940. Following the German invasion of 10 May 1940, O 25 was scuttled in the Nieuwe Waterweg near Rotterdam because there was no tugboat available to tow her to the United Kingdom.

The boat was raised by the Germans and it was decided to repair and complete her. She served in the Kriegsmarine as UD-3 and was commissioned on 8 June 1941.

From June to July 1941 UD-3 served as a trial boat in Kiel while attached to the 3rd Flotilla. In June she was transferred to the 5th Flotilla also in Kiel where she was used as a school boat. She remained there until August that year. From August 1941 until September 1942 the boat was stationed at Lorient in occupied France and attached to the 2nd Flotilla. In October 1942 she was transferred to 10th Flotilla also in Lorient where she served until February 1943.

When patrolling off the west coast of Africa UD-3 spotted and sank the 5,041 GRT Norwegian freighter Indra on 26 November 1942.

In March 1943 the boat was transferred to Bergen in occupied Norway and attached to the U-boot Abwehr Schule to be used as school boat until October 1944. On 13 October 1944, UD-3 was decommissioned after being damaged in an air raid on Kiel. On 3 May 1945 the boat was scuttled.

== Summary of raiding history ==
Date	Ship Name	Nationality	Tonnage (GRT)	Fate
26 November 1942	Indra	Norway	5,041	Sunk

== Bibliography ==
- Busch, Rainer; Röll, Hans-Joachim (1999). German U-boat commanders of World War II : a biographical dictionary. Translated by Brooks, Geoffrey. London, Annapolis, Md: Greenhill Books, Naval Institute Press. ISBN 978-1-55750-186-8.
- Gröner, Erich; Jung, Dieter; Maass, Martin (1991). German Warships 1815–1945, U-boats and Mine Warfare Vessels. Vol. 2. Translated by Thomas, Keith; Magowan, Rachel. London: Conway Maritime Press. ISBN 978-0-85177-593-7.
