= Damayanti (given name) =

- Gender: Female
- Language: Hindi; Sanskrit

Origin
- Meaning: "soothing" "subduing"
- Region of origin: India

Damayanti (Hindi : दमयंती) or Dayamanthi is a Hindu/Sanskrit Indian feminine given name, which means "soothing" and "subduing".

== Notable people with the given name ==
=== Damayanti ===
- Damayanti Beshra, Santali writer and poet
- Damayanti Buchori, Entomologist
- Damayanti Joshi (1928–2004), Indian choreographer and dancer
- Damayanti Tambay, wife of Flt lt V. V. Tambay, one of the missing 54 Indian defence personnel from the 1971 Indo-Pak war who are believed to be in Pakistani custody

=== Damayanthi ===
- Damayanthi Dharsha (born 1975), Sri Lankan athlete who competed in the 200 and 400 metres race

== See also ==
(people with the surname)

- Ayu Fani Damayanti (born 1988), Indonesian tennis player
- Anusha Damayanthi (born 1978), Sri Lankan cinema and television actress

== Others ==
- Damayanti, a character in Hindu mythology, princess of Vidarbha Kingdom and King Nala of Nishadha's wife.
