= Damayanti Buchori =

- Education: PhD Indiana University at Bloomington MS University of Illinois Urbana-Champaign BS Bogor Agricultural University
- Awards: Honorary Fellow, ATBC (Association of Tropical Biology and Conservation), 2018.
- Scientific career
- Fields: Entomology & Evolutionary Ecology

Damayanti Buchori is an entomologist and land use ecologist, currently based in Bogor, Indonesia. She is a professor, researcher, non-profit director, and an ATBC honorary fellow.

== Education ==
Damayanti Buchori received a Bachelor’s of agriculture from the department of pest and plant diseases at Bogor Agricultural University. She completed her Master of Science in Entomology at the University of Illinois at Urbana. Her PhD in Ecology, Evolution and Behaviour is from the Indiana University at Bloomington. The title of her dissertation is “Interaction dynamic between Nasiona vitripennis (Hymenoptera: Pteromalidae) and son killer bacteria.”

== Career ==
Damayanti Buchori is currently the Director at the Center for Transdisciplinary and Sustainability Sciences at Institut Pertanian Bogor (IPB) University. She has over 20 years of teaching experience, working as a professor at Bogor Agricultural University since 1993. Buchori is the vice president of the Indonesian Entomological Society. She was co-chair of the Food Security and Sustainable Agriculture task force for the 2022 G20 Bali summit. She was previously Executive Director at the KEHATI Foundation, a non-profit organization focused on biodiversity conservation. She also worked as the executive director at Peduli Konservasi Alam Indonesia (PEKA Foundation), an environmental education organization.

Buchori’s research focuses on insect ecology, specifically biological control, pest management, biodiversity, ecosystem services, and land use change. She is an author on over 200 scientific publications. Two of the papers she has authored are featured in Science. Her most recent project focuses on sustainable land management practices for oil palm and rubber farms. As seen by her participation in not for profit organizations, Damayanti Buchori, along with conducting research, focuses much of her work on policy, community empowerment, and sustainability advocacy.

== Awards ==
- Best presenter in the Indonesian Entomological Society Meeting, Bandung, 1997.
- The Iris Darnton-Whitley Award for International Nature Conservation, The Royal Geographical Society of London, 2000.
- Man and Biosphere (MAB) Certificate, UNESCO-LIPI, 2001.
- International Conservation Scientist Award, Wildlife Trust, New York, 2006.
- Honorary Fellow, ATBC (Association of Tropical Biology and Conservation), 2018.
- Most cited author from IPB University in the Natural Sciences, IPB, Bogor, 2020.

== Selected publications ==
- Tradeoffs between income, biodiversity, and ecosystem functioning during tropical rainforest conversion and agroforestry intensification, 2007, PNAS.
- Multifunctional shade-tree management in tropical agroforestry landscapes – a review, 2011, Journal of Applied Ecology.
- Mutually beneficial pollinator diversity and crop yield outcomes in small and large farms, 2016, Science.
- Balancing economic and ecological functions in smallholder and industrial oil palm plantations, 2024, PNAS.
- Joint environmental and social benefits from diversified agriculture, 2024, Science.
