= Network Access License =

The Network Access License (NAL) is mandatory for telecommunication equipment that is exported to or sold in China. This license applies to telecommunication equipment that is connected to the public telecommunication network. For receiving the Network Access License, an application has to be submitted at the Ministry of Industry and Information Technology (MIIT) in Beijing. Among others, the Ministry of Industry and Information Technology is responsible for the Chinese regulation and development of the Internet, Wireless, broadcasting, communications and production of electronic and information goods, and the promotion of the national knowledge economy.

== History ==
In 2001, the Chinese authorities published the first three product categories requiring NAL. Since then, about 25 product categories including about 300 different kinds of telecommunication devices have been added to the product catalogue. Furthermore, the NAL products are categorized in basic and high-end equipment. In August 2014, the Ministry of Industry and Information Technology has issued 495 network access licenses for telecom equipment. In 2014, there are only 14 test laboratories that are authorized for the testing of the telecommunication equipment. Most of these test laboratories are specialized on product categories.

== Application process ==
The application process is a 4-step process and include:

- Submission of application documents
- Product tests
- Factory inspection
- License issue

The length of time required to obtain an NAL varies according to the product for which the license is sought. Based on current regulations, it usually takes 20 days for testing and 60 days for processing an application. Nevertheless, for some products it may take longer.

== See also ==
- Ministry of Industry and Information Technology of the People's Republic of China MIIT
- Standardization Administration of China SAC
- Electronic information industry in China
- Ministries of China
