= Nalan Kaygın =

Turkish badminton player (born 1993)

Personal information
- Born: 1993 (age 32–33) Turkey

Sport
- Country: Turkey
- Sport: Badminton
- Event: Women's singles & doubles
Medal record
Representing Turkey
Women's badminton

Nalan Kaygın (born 1993) is a Turkish national deaf badminton player. She also was once a national deaf curler. She occasionally takes part in deaf athletics as middle and long-distance runner.

== Sport career ==
Kaygın started playing badminton at the age of twelve. She was a member of DSİ Bentspor, before she joined Türasaş SK, the sports club of her employer company. She won a number of national champion titles.

She competed in the women's singles, doubles and mixed doubles events at the 2013 Deaflympics in Sofia, Bulgaria and 2017 Deaflympics in Samsun, Turkey. Her best ranking was fifth in the women's doubles with partner Esra Zeynep Ergincan at the 2017 Samsun Deaflympics. She played in the singles event at the 2018 European Deaf Badminton Championships in Trenčín, Slovakia in July.

She ran the 10 km event for the deaf at the Eskişehir Half Marathon Tournament in August 2024. In February 2025, she competed in the 400 m running at the Turkish Indoor Deaf Athletics Championships in Ataköy, Istanbul.

She took part in the singles event at the 2025 European Deaf Badminton Championships in Brno, Czech Republic, and failed to advance to the semifinals. She competed at the 2025 Deaflympics in Tokyo, Japan. She was also part of the Turkey women's national deaf curling team at the 2023 Winter Deaflympics in Erzurum, Turkey that took place in 2024. She took the bronze medal in the singles and the gold medal in the doubles event with Hale Nur Küçüksevgili at the 2026 Turkish Deaf Badminton Championships in Osmancık, Çorum.

== Personal life ==
Nalan Kaygın was born in 1993. She lives in Eskişehir, western Turkey. She is congenitally hearing impaired. She studied in the Education, Research and Application Center for Hearing Impaired Children (İÇEM) at Anadolu University, and learned to read lips there. She also received speech training in rehabilitation centers. Since 2016 she has been working as a graphic designer for social media, website designs and photography in the press and public relations department at the TÜRASAŞ, a state-owned locomotive and railroad car producer in her hometown.
