= KRI Nala =

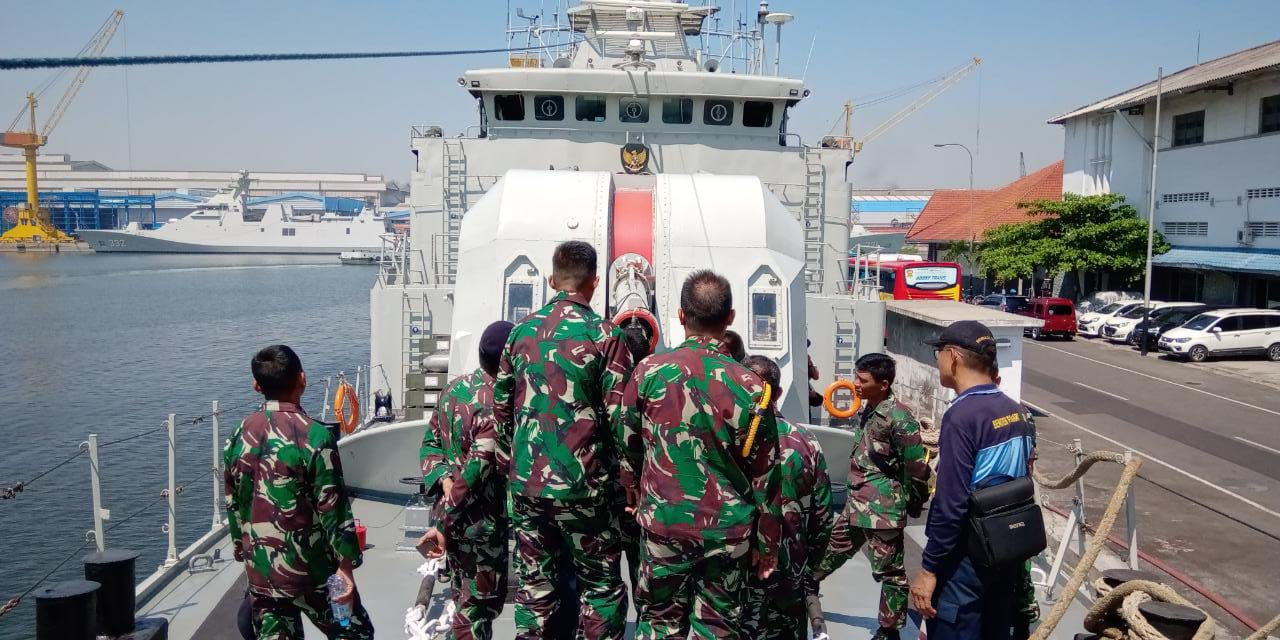
- Main gun and bridge of KRI Nala

History

Indonesia
- Name: KRI Nala (363)
- Namesake: Mpu Nala
- Builder: Wilton-Fijenoord, Schiedam, Netherlands
- Laid down: 27 January 1978
- Launched: 11 January 1979
- Commissioned: 4 August 1980
- Status: In active service

General characteristics
- Class & type: Fatahillah-class corvette
- Displacement: 1,200 long tons (1,200 t) standard; 1,450 long tons (1,470 t) full
- Length: 84 m (275 ft 7 in)
- Beam: 11.10 m (36 ft 5 in)
- Draught: 3.30 m (10 ft 10 in)
- Propulsion: Combined diesel or gas, 2 shafts; 1 × Rolls-Royce Olympus TM-3B gas turbine, 21,000 kW (28,000 shp) and; 2 × MTU 16V956 TB81 diesel engines, 6,000 bhp (4,500 kW)
- Speed: 30 knots (56 km/h)
- Range: 4,250 nautical miles (7,870 km) at 16 knots (30 km/h)
- Complement: 89
- Armament: 1 × Bofors 120 mm L/46 gun; 2 × Bofors 40 mm L/70 guns; 2 × Rheinmetall Rh-202 20 mm guns; 4 × Exocet MM 38 anti-ship missiles (the missiles might be removed due to obsolete); 1 × Bofors 375 mm twin anti-submarine rocket launcher
- Aircraft carried: 1 × helicopter
- Aviation facilities: Flight deck and telescopic hangar

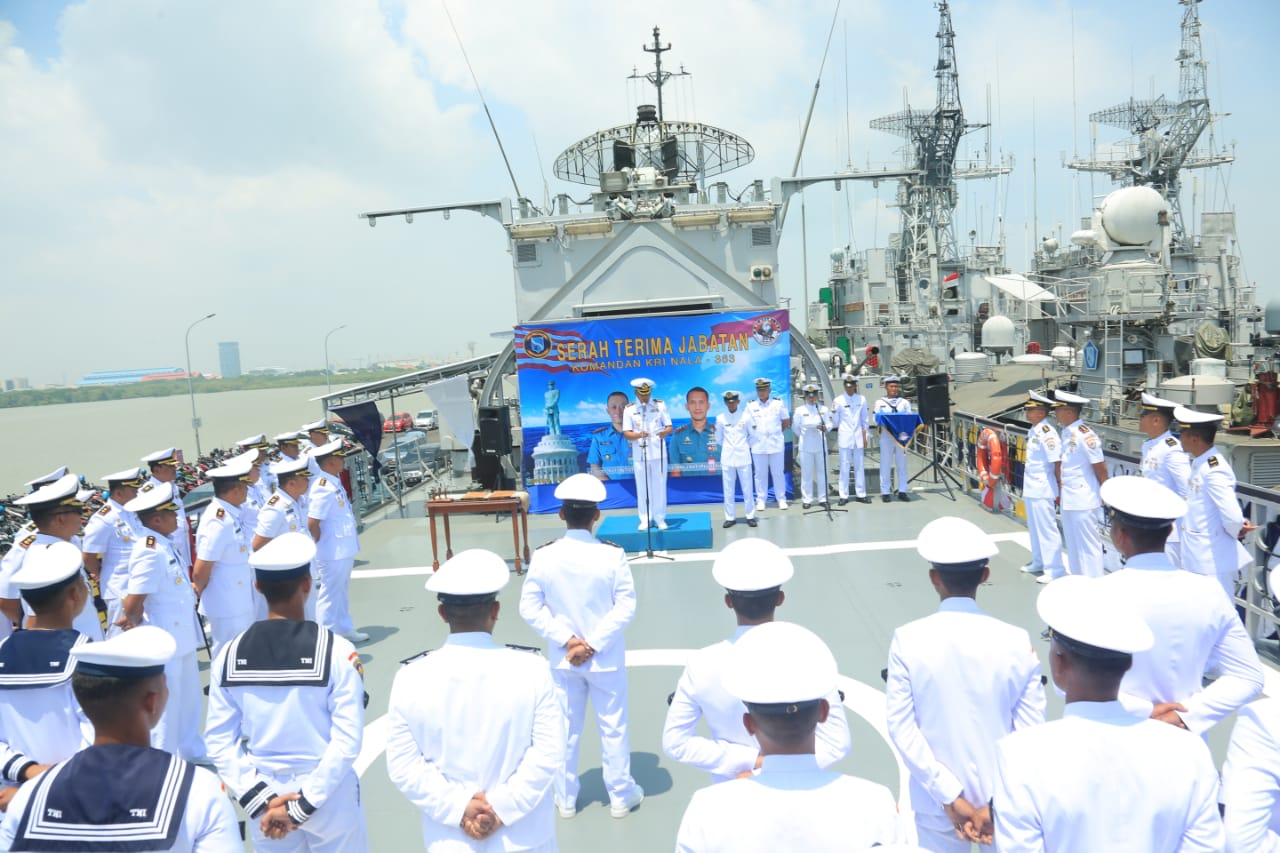
A ceremony held on Nala's helicopter deck

KRI Nala (363) is an Indonesian Navy ship named after Mpu Nala, a military commander of the Majapahit Empire. The ship is a missile-equipped corvette, the third ship of Fatahillah-class corvette.

== Design ==
Nala has a length of 84 m (276 ft), a beam of 11.10 m (36.4 ft), a draught of 3.3 m (11 ft) and displacement of 1,200 long tons (1,200 t) standard and 1,450 long tons (1,470 t) at full load. The ship has two shafts and powered with CODOG-type propulsion, which consisted of one Rolls-Royce Olympus TM-3B gas turbine with 21,000 kW (28,000 shp) and two MTU 16V956 TB81 diesel engines with 6,000 bhp (4,500 kW). The ship has a range of 4,250 nautical miles (7,870 km) while cruising at 16 knots (30 km/h) and top speed of 30 knots (56 km/h). Nala has a complement of 89 personnel, including 11 officers.

The ship are armed with one Bofors 120 mm Automatic Gun L/46, two Bofors 40 mm Automatic Gun L/70 and two Rheinmetall Mk 20 Rh-202 autocannons. For anti-submarine warfare, the ship is equipped with one Bofors 375 mm twin anti-submarine rocket launcher. For surface warfare, Nala was equipped with four Exocet MM 38 anti-ship missile launchers. Due to obsolescence, the ship never carried the missiles since early 2000s. Nala also has a flight deck and telescopic hangar astern and able to carry a single helicopter, unlike other ships in the class.

The ship's countermeasure systems consisted of two Vickers Mk 4 chaff launchers and T-Mk 6 torpedo decoy outfit. As built, the electronics and sensors consisted of HSA DA-05 air and surface surveillance radar, Decca AC 1229 surface warning radar, HSA WM-28 tracking radar, Van der Heem PHS 32 sonar and WCS WM20 fire-control system. As of 2009, some of them were replaced or upgraded, which were consisted of two Knebworth Corvus 8-tubed trainable chaff launchers, ECM MEL Susie-1 and Signaal LIROD fire-control system.

== Service history ==
Nala was laid down on 27 January 1978 at Wilton-Fijenoord, Schiedam, Netherlands. The ship was launched on 11 January 1979 and was commissioned on 4 August 1980.

The Nala was deployed to help look for the missing Adam Air Flight 574.
