= Wilton-Fijenoord =

Shipyard in Schiedam, Netherlands

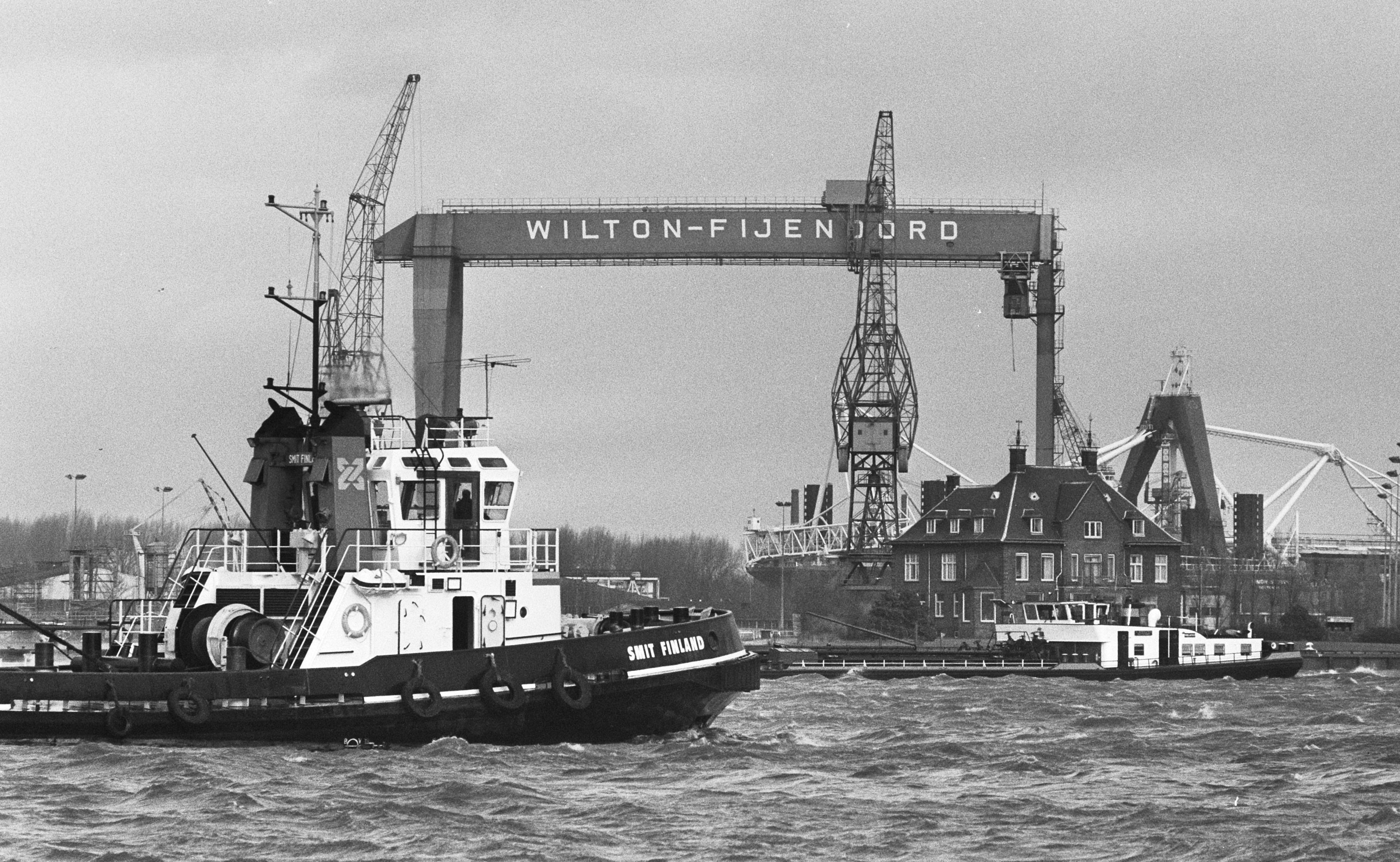
- Wilton-Fijenoord shipyard in Schiedam in 1984
- Industry: Defence, shipbuilding
- Founded: 1929 in Rotterdam
- Founder: Bartel Wilton
- Defunct: 1999
- Fate: Bought by Damen Group
- Successor: Damen Shiprepair Rotterdam (DSR)
- Headquarters: Schiedam, Netherlands
- Area served: worldwide
- Products: Warships, passenger ships, tankships and cargo ships
- Website: www.damen.com

Wilton-Fijenoord was a shipbuilding and repair company in Schiedam, Netherlands from 1929 to 1999. Presently, the shipyard of Wilton-Feijnoord is part of Damen Shiprepair Rotterdam.

Wilton-Fijenoord was the result of a merger between the ship repair yard Wilton and the old Fijenoord shipyard. The idea was that the new combination would be more efficient on the huge terrain that Wilton had developed in Schiedam. The new company barely survived the great depression. In the 1950s and 1960s it flourished.

In 1964 Wilton-Fijenoord merged with the machine factory Bronswerk to form Wilton-Fijenoord-Bronswerk. In 1968, this combination was torn apart by Stork and Rijn-Schelde Groep. The latter got the maritime activities of Wilton-Fijenoord. In 1971 Rijn-Schelde merged with Verolme Shipyards to become Rijn-Schelde-Verolme. Wilton-Fijenoord was one of many daughters of the conglomerate.

Wilton-Fijenoord became independent again in 1983. Even so, it was not able to compete against shipbuilding in the far east. In late 1987 it ended this activity and became successful as a repair only company. However, by the early 1990s, Wilton-Fijenoord got into trouble by competition from eastern Europe. A failed attempt to get back in to shipbuilding then led to the demise of the company.

Damen Group Rotterdam currently runs a shipyard on the eastern half of what was once the Wilton-Fijenoord shipyard. It uses three of the old graving docks of the company.

== Merger of Wilton and Fijenoord (1929) ==
Wilton-Fijenoord had two predecessors. Wilton's Dok- en Werf Maatschappij was the biggest predecessor of Wilton-Fijenoord, the other was the Shipyard Fijenoord. By the mid 1920s these shipyards had become rather similar. Wilton still had an advantage in ship repair, and Fijenoord was still ahead in ship construction, especially for the navy. The idea for a merger dated as far back as at least 1927. The rationale was that the still profitable Wilton company had a major overcapacity and was spread over two locations. The activities of Fijenoord could just as well be done in Schiedam. A concentration of the combined activities in Schiedam would lead to major cost savings. In 1929 talks led to an agreement for a financial merger between the companies. Shares in Wilton and shares in Fijenoord were exchanged for shares in a new united company: Dok- en Werf-Maatschappij Wilton-Fijenoord. The ratio between worth of Wilton and Fijenoord was 15.5 : 3.

A new board of directors was formed by combining the board of directors of Wilton with that of Fijenoord. It had seven members, of which three from the Wilton family. The merger had taken place by creating a new public company that got all the shares of the existing companies. This was a fast way to merge, but it also meant that the organisations themselves continued to exist from a legal as well as an organizational perspective. These had a rather different culture. Many Wilton employees thought the Fijenoord men to be too precise and arrogant. Fijenoord employees tended to look at the Wilton men as disorganized, improvising and rude.

== The Great Depression ==
The Great Depression that started in November 1929 came at a very bad moment for Wilton-Fijenoord. Economic activity came to an almost complete standstill with regard to orders for new ships. Massive lay-offs reduced the number of employees at the company from 7,790 at the end of 1929 to 3,849 at the end of 1930, a decrease of 50%. In this crisis Wilton-Fijenoord faced a difficult decision. Should it radically concentrate all activity in Schiedam, and hope that the high cost for the move would be earned back by cost-savings? Or, should it evade the cost of the move by continuing at multiple locations? In 1932 the board decided to close down the Fijenoord location, and to move the activities on the Westkousdijk (Delfshaven) to Schiedam as much as possible. In the end this ambition to centralize everything in Schiedam would not be realized (cf. below).

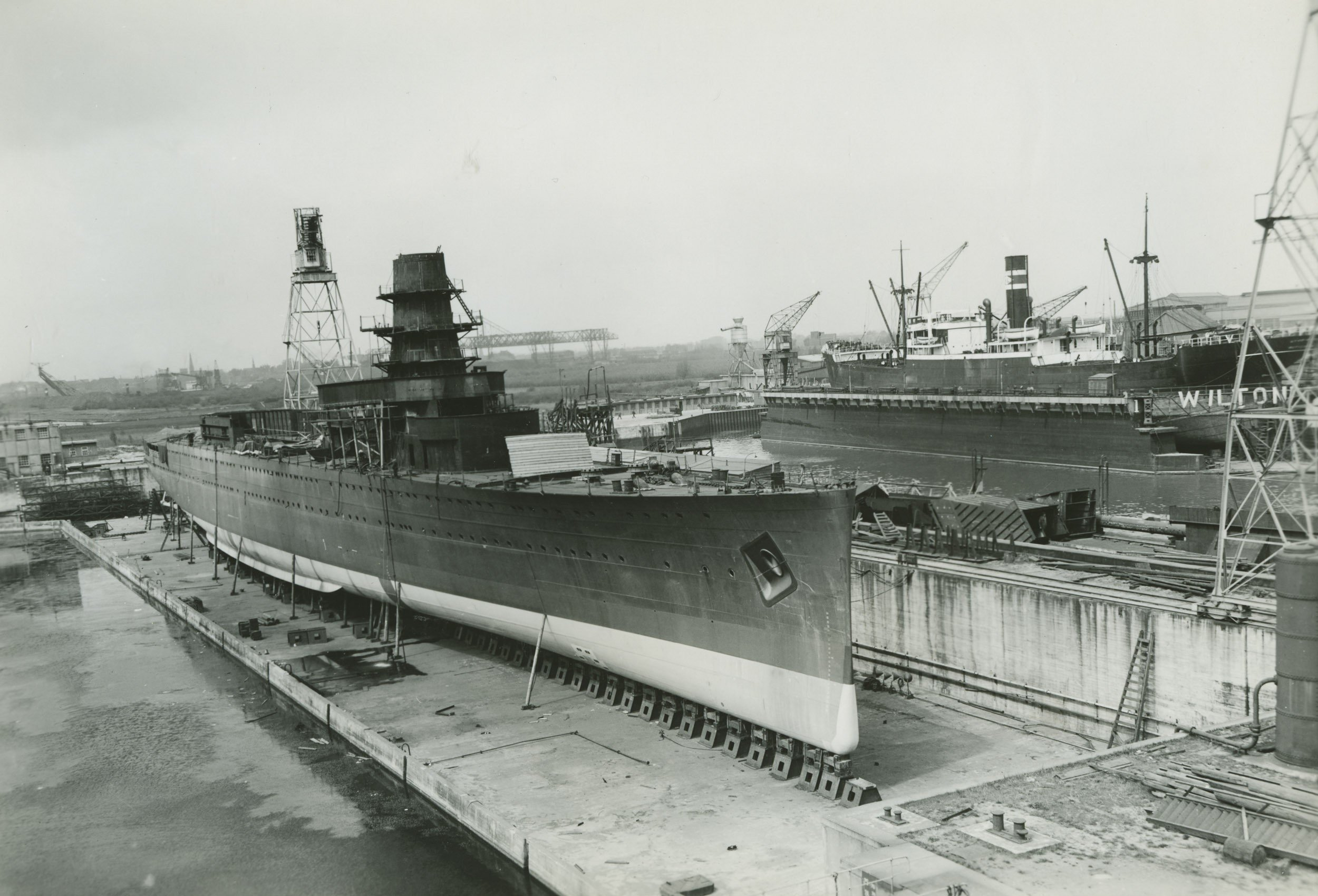
The light cruiser De Ruyter under construction in 1935

Meanwhile, the crisis grew ever darker. Dividend payments were stopped, reserves were shrinking, and even the payment of interest became doubtful. The costs of the move to Schiedam also proved higher than estimated. Of course cost cutting was somewhat effective, but it was not enough. In 1932 the order for the cruiser HNLMS De Ruyter gave some air to the company. A few repair orders were also profitable. The shipyard also took over the machinery of bankrupt HIH Siderius artillery firm in 1934 and in the second half of the 1930s built 120-mm and 150-mm guns for the Dutch Navy jointly with Bofors, also producing several Wilton-Fijenoord Pantserwagen armoured cars in the mid-1930s. In 1935 the three floating dock were towed to Schiedam. Nevertheless, in 1935 the repair orders hit an absolute low, with 301 ships for 1,622,960 rtb.

On 29 January 1936 the board then proposed to postpone the repayment of part of open bonds by one year. The department of defense intervened by giving advance payments on submarine mine layers. In the end a government guarantee of a private loan of 1,500,000 guilders saved the company. A financial reorganization followed in 1936. The nominal capital of 25,000,000 guilders, which had been reduced to 15,500,000 guilders earlier, was further reduced to 4,650,000 guilders. Two old loans were repaid. It allowed the company to raise new capital of 3,900,000 in 1938. By 1938 the ship repair business had recovered. In 1928 the number of ships using the dry docks was 486 for a tonnage 2,506,609 R.T.B. In 1938 it were 463 ships with 2,590,696 R.T.B. In 1938 and 1939 the shipyard paid dividend again.

=== Tankers ===
Launch of tanker Nederland on 8 March 1937

The construction of tankers was the only kind of civilian construction that kept the large Dutch shipyards afloat. In November 1933 the Anglo-Saxon Petroleum company (part of Royal Dutch Shell) placed an order for three tankers of 12,000 tons capacity. One at NSM, one at RDM and one at Wilton-Fijenoord. The tanker at Wilton got the name Rapana. In the whole year 1934, Wilton-Fijenoord did not receive any order for a new ship. At the end of 1934 the work on Rapana was the only work on new merchant ships still ongoing. In early 1935 the Bataafse Petroleum Maatschappij, another subsidiary of Shell, ordered six tankers for 6,000,000 guilders. The NSM would build the two largest of 12,100 tons. Wilton-Fijenoord would build two of the four ships of 9,250-ton capacity each. The order came in on 5 February 1935 and would permit Wilton to keep her slipways reasonably filled. In late 1935 Wilton-Fijenoord got another order for a 9,100 ton tanker. On 18 January 1936 Eulota of 9,100 tons was launched. On 25 April 1936 Elusa was launched. On 7 November 1936 the third 9,100-ton capacity ship Eulima was launched. In early November 1936 Wilton-Fijenoord got a new order for one tanker of 12,000 tons and one tanker of 9,000 tons.

The Nederlandsche Pacific Petroleum Maatschappij was active in the Dutch East Indies. It was a subsidiary of Standard Oil Company of California, later (Chevron Corporation). In May 1936 it ordered a 12,000-ton tanker at Wilton-Fijenoord. In June 1936 the Nederlandsche Pacific Petroleum Maatschappij then signed a contract for oil exploration in a big area of southern Sumatra. On 6 March 1937 the tanker called Nederland was launched.

=== Warships ===
19 Sep. 1938, launch of O 19

The order for two K XIV-class submarines, laid down in June 1931 was very welcome, but could not save the company. As stated above the order for the light cruiser De Ruyter was a more substantial 'aid'. The two mine-laying O 19-class submarines were laid down in June 1936. At that moment the worst of the crisis was over, but the liquidity was saved by the above-mentioned advance payments on these ships. The De Zeven Provinciën-class cruiser that was later named De Ruyter was laid down in September 1939, too late to be launched before the Netherlands were occupied in 1940.

=== Cooperation in design ===
A notorious problem of the Dutch shipyards before the Second World War, was the lack of design capabilities. Accordingly, Wilton-Fijenoord had to buy the vessel designs from independent design companies and developed only the detailed structures. By a cartel agreement, four Dutch yards including Wilton-Fijenoord formed a joint design office in 1935. As a contractor, the yard contributed mainly its expertise in organizing the construction of ships.

Another cooperation in design was that between Fijenoord and the IVS or NV Ingenieurskantoor voor Scheepsbouw. The IVS was deeply involved in the design of De Ruyter, and so the similarity in appearance between the Deutschland-class cruisers and De Ruyter is explained.

== World War II ==
After the German invasion in May 1940, the board of Wilton-Fijenoord consisted of W. Wilton, C.H. Teschmacher, ir. J.H.H. Verloop, and Mr. Kanter. Mr. Kanter soon quit citing health reasons, and Verloop was in the United States. The remaining board members found themselves in a very difficult position. They headed a company that built warships and owned floating dry docks that could be used to maintain and repair major warships. The board was also responsible for 4,200 employees. It resulted in a kind of give and take policy whereby the company collaborated, but meanwhile sabotaged the results.

During the War Wilton-Fijenoord completed the submarine O 25, which had been launched a few days before the war. She would serve in the German Kriegsmarine as UD-3 and actually sink an Allied ship. During the war Fijenoord would also launch the cruiser later named De Ruyter, but known at that moment as KH 1 (Kreuzer Holland 1).

The shipyard was severely bombarded by the allied airforce. The bombardments focused on the large dry docks. The 46,000 tons Pola Drydock ('drydock 4') was damaged so severely that the Germans almost decided to break it up. The 20,000 tons 'drydock 5' became unusable and was towed to the Waalhaven. In the second half of 1943, the occupier began to plunder the assets of the shipyard, moving the machinery and tools to Germany. In November 1944, many of its employees were taken to work Germany.

== Post World War II ==
=== On trial for collaboration ===
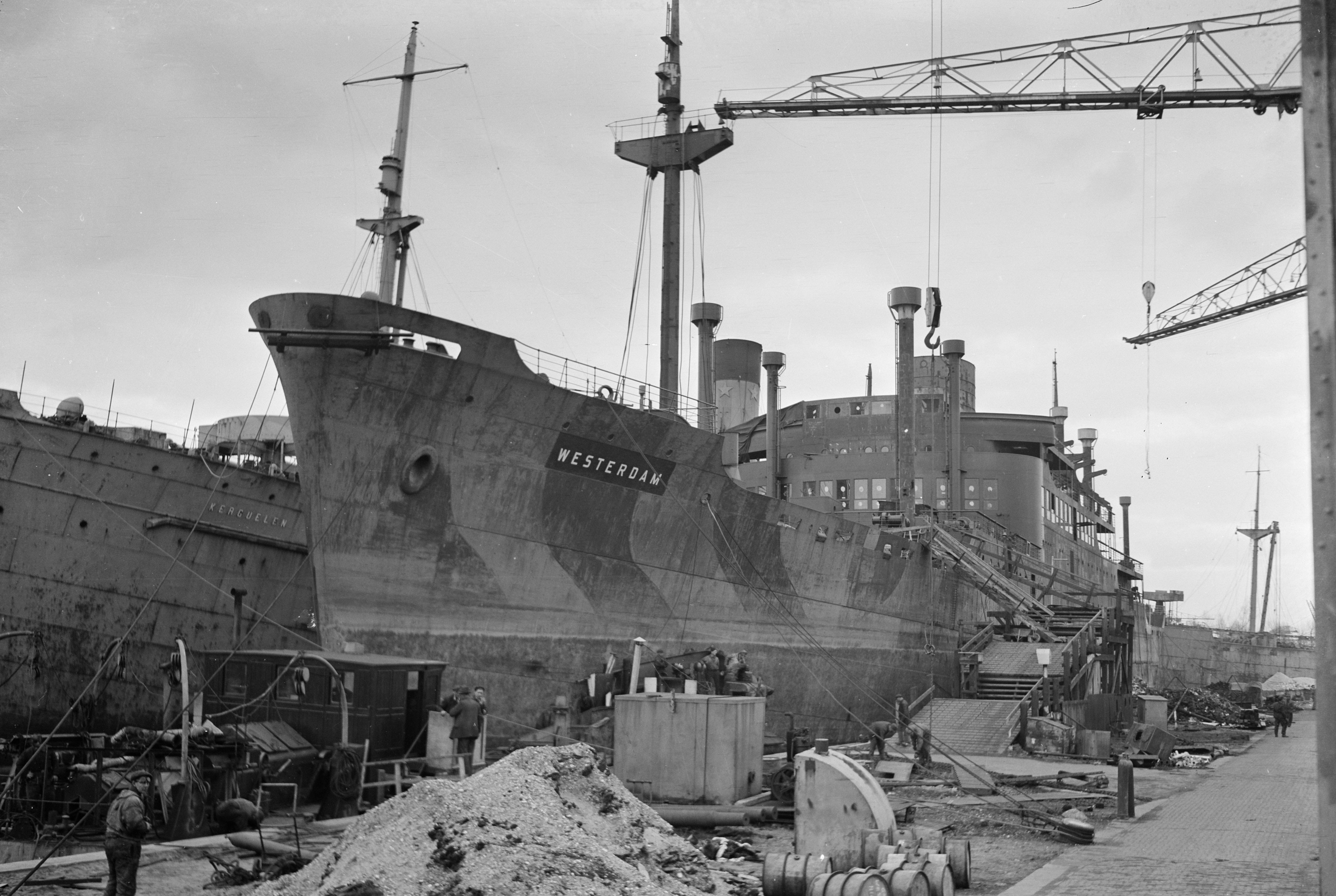
Finishing Westerdam; 19 February 1946

After the war, the board of Wilton-Fijenoord was accused of collaboration. While W. Wilton continued in the board, C.H. Teschmacher, A.C. Metzelaar, and F. Muller were arrested in June 1945. In mid-June 1946, they were set free as the accusations were deemed less serious. In October 1947, Teschmacher and Müller were arrested again. In February 1948, a trial was finally started. This time William Wilton, who had obviously not been arrested, also faced charges. A verdict of 20 March imposed heavy fines and convicted Teschmacher, Metzelaar, Muller to prison sentences. The sentence also forbade all four suspects to work in the management of shipbuilding or machine factories for three years.

In January 1949, the verdict was appealed at the special Court of cassation in The Hague. The court of cassation cancelled the verdict and forwarded the case to the special court in Amsterdam. A December 1949 verdict contained the following punishments: C.H. Teschmacher 18 months in prison and a fine of 30,000; F. Muller 16 months and 20,000 guilders; W. Wilton to pay 50,000 guilders; A.C.M. Metzelaar 12 months in prison. The directors appealed again at the special court of cassation. This time the sentences were much more lenient: Wilton only got a suspended prison sentence; Teschmacher only got nine months; Müller got 12 months and a fine of 10,000 guilders. All with subtraction of the time they had already spent in detention. The court said that the accused had not resisted enough. Müller was to blame most, because he had let himself be appointed as board member.

=== Back in business ===
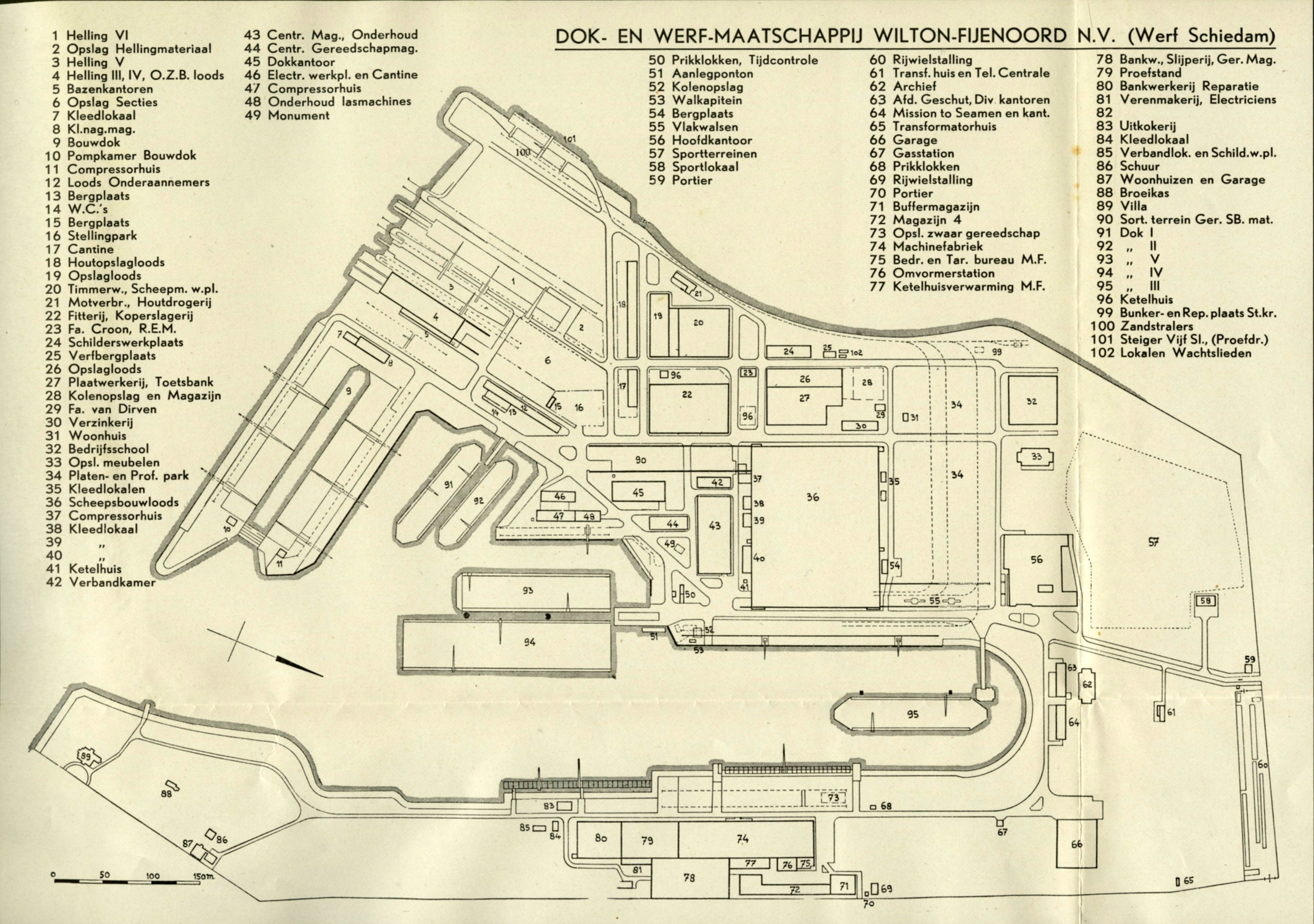
Floor plan of Wilton-Fijenoord in the early 1950s

After the war a new board of directors was formed by: W. Wilton, ir. M.J. Römer, S. van West, and ir. J.H.H. Verloop. The shipyard itself was a ruin and most of its machinery and equipment was lost. The company was lucky that the old bank slope of predecessor Wilton at the Westkousdijk, and the iron foundry of predecessor Fijenoord at Feijenoord were still usable. In spite of these challenges the yard started on its first repair order already on 19 June 1945. For repair jobs it often used the fixed building dock, because 'drydock 4' and 'drydock 5' were broken.

In October 1945 Annenkerk, ordered before the war, was laid down. Westerdam, which had been laid down before the war was also finished. The cruiser De Ruyter would also be finished, but her plan had to be changed drastically because of the experience gained in the war. In 1946 new ships were ordered. One by the Rotterdamsche Lloyd, and two by KPM. Repair orders also increased in 1946. In 1946 Dutch escort carrier HNLMS Karel Doorman was also docked several times at the shipyard for repairs and maintenance.

=== Back to normal productivity ===
It took some time for the ship repair activity at Wilton Fijenoord to get back to pre-war levels. In 1946 Wilton's dry docks served 97 ships. In early 1947, the 20,000 tons 'drydock 5' was fixed. In that year 166 ships were repaired in the dry docks, double the tonnage of the previous year. Wilton-Fijenoord hesitated about fixing the 46,000 tons drydock, as the cost were very high. In the end it decided to repair it, because WF expected ship size to further increase in the future. On 11 April 1950 Drydock 4 was repaired and taken into use again. In 1952, the tonnage of ships repaired matched that of 1938.

Meanwhile, the shipyard had to catch up with the advanced welding techniques that had revolutionized British and American shipbuilding. This allowed the shipyard to execute a lot of work in the welding halls instead of on the slipways.

On the Westkousdijk a gun factory had been created before the war. In cooperation with Bofors it now started the construction of armored double 15 cm turrets for the two De Zeven Provinciën-class cruisers, as well as armored 12 cm turrets for destroyers

The former Fijenoord terrain started a second youth when the foundry was modernized and a new model office was started.

In March 1946 a license agreement was signed with William Doxford & Sons to produce Doxford Diesel engines. In Schiedam a testbed was realized just in time to test the first Doxford engines in 1949.

=== The 1950s ===
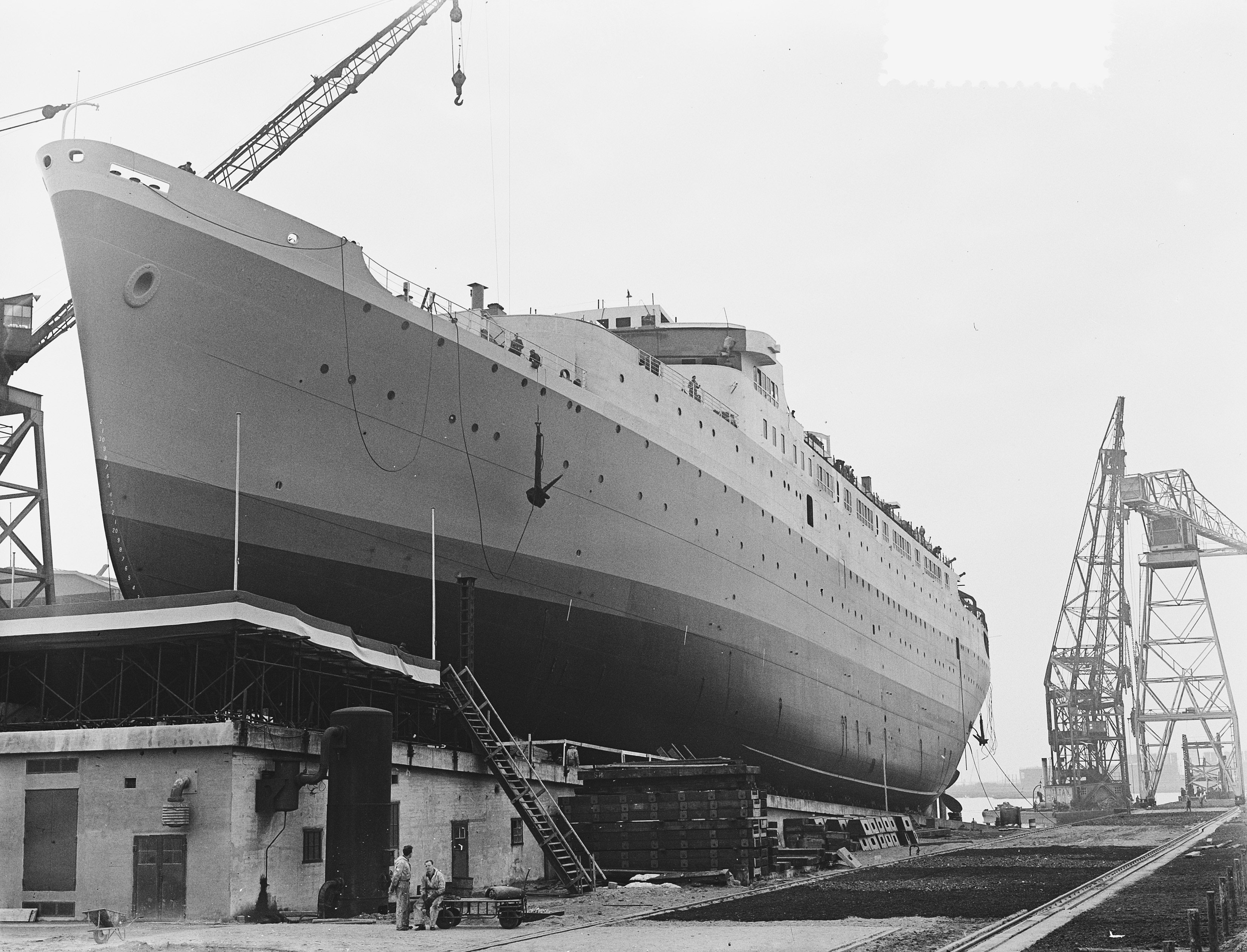
Maasdam under construction 4 April 1952

The construction of Rijndam (1951) and Maasdam (1952) probably signaled the full recovery of the company. The Korean War would give rise to an increased demand for ships, especially tankers. In the summer of 1952 the construction of the big fixed building dock started. It was to be 211 m long and 31.5 m wide. The machine factory was expanded, and so were the facilities on the Westkousdijk. The company became the chief contractor for 32 minesweepers, of which it would build three. Between 1 September 1952 and 1 December 1953 the Dutch aircraft carrier HNLMS Karel Doorman was docked at Wilton-Fijenoord for maintenance. Two years later, on 13 May 1955, Karel Doorman was once again docked at the shipyard. This time the aircraft carrier underwent a complete rebuilt, which would be completed by 28 may 1958.

The 1950s would bring a major update of the facilities of the shipyard. In 1950, the company decided that it should update its drydocks to adjust to accommodate ships of up to 38,000dwt. The fact that a floating dry dock would require more space and an investment to dig a mooring place, led to the construction of the double graving dock called Dok 6 and Dok 7. Dok 6 was 211 m long at floor level and was opened in 1955. Dok 7 was slightly longer at 214 m and was opened in 1956. The same plan led to new buildings for the machine factories.

== Wilton-Fijenoord-Bronswerk NV ==
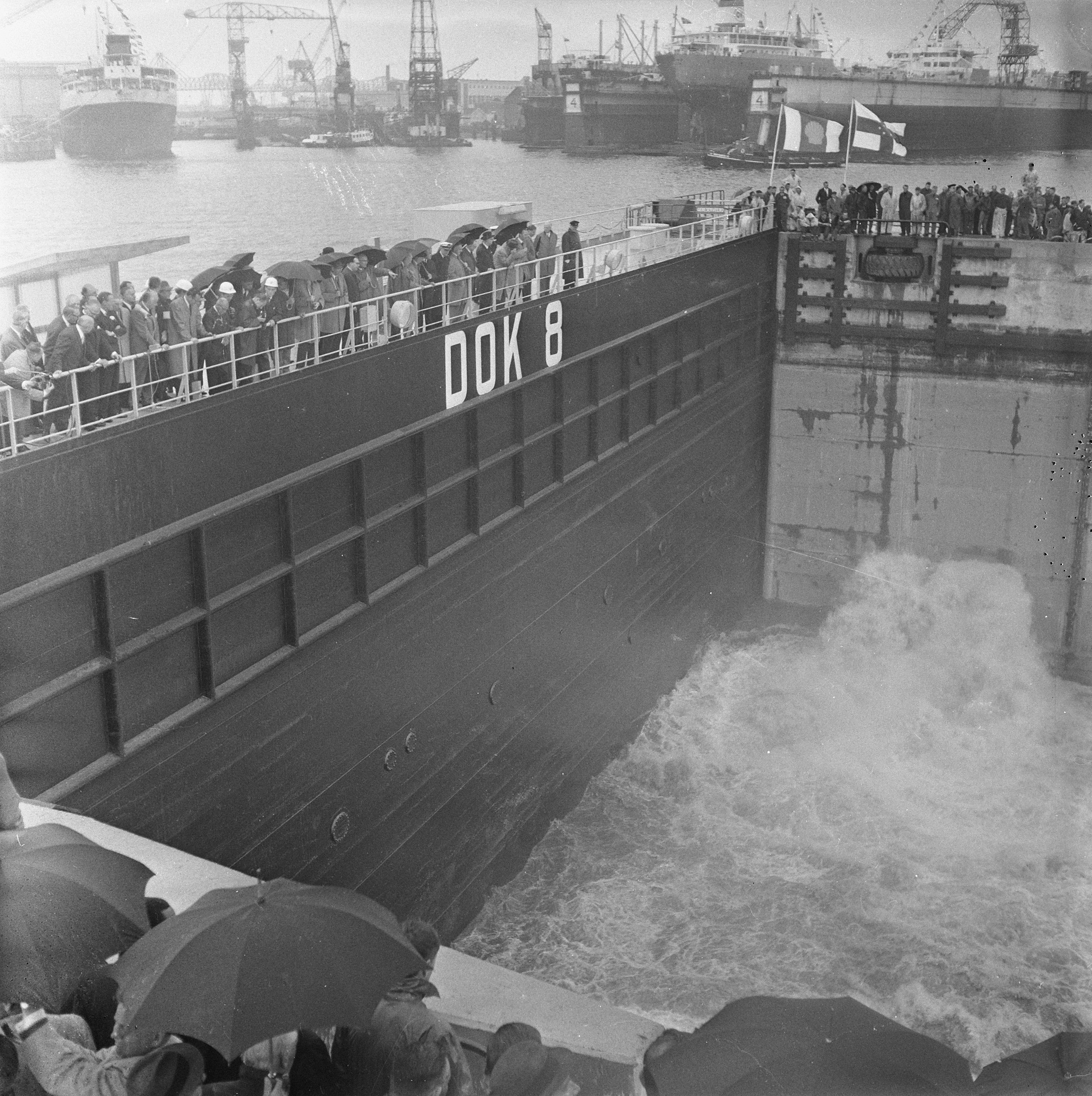
21 June 1966, 150,000dwt graving dock 'Dok 8' is opened

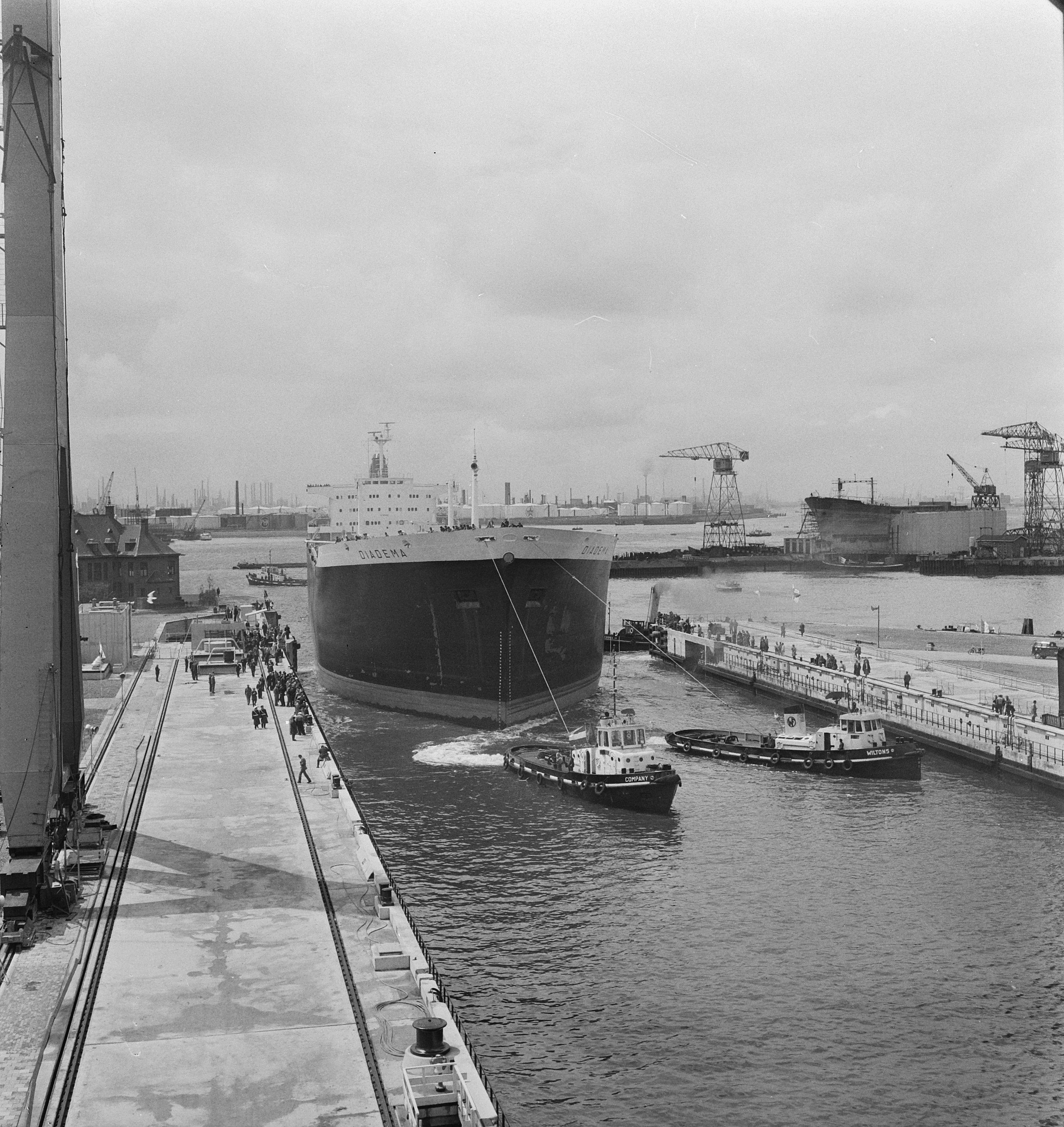
The 243.7 m long tanker Diadema enters 'Dok 8'

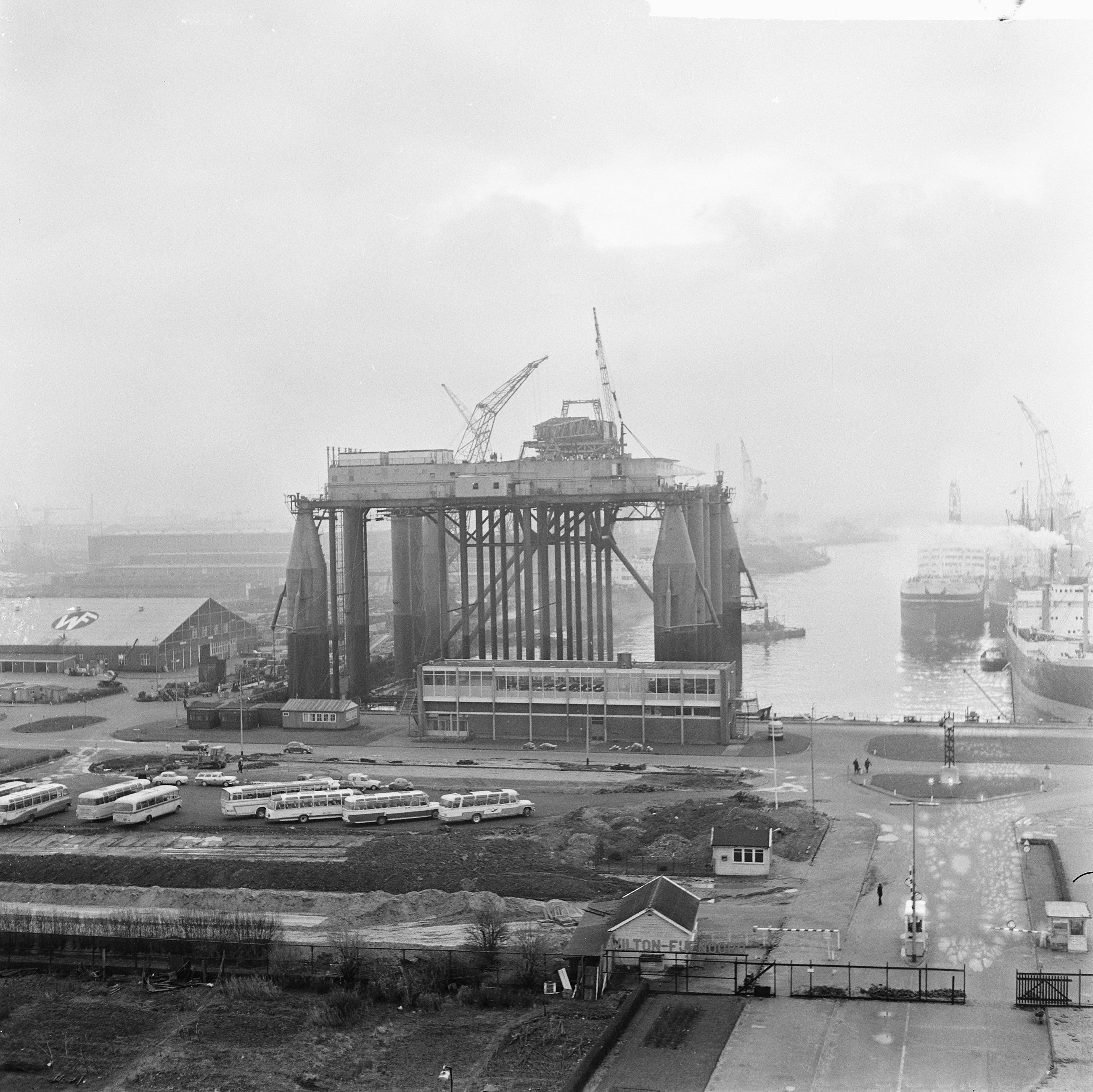
Oil platform Transworld Rig 58 in Schiedam, 1966

By the mid-1960s, the Western-European shipbuilding industry suffered from strong competition from Japan. A government commission headed by Mr. Keyzer advised to merge shipyards, so they could profit from economies of scale.

In October 1964, Wilton-Fijenoord had reacted to these developments by announcing a merger with the Amersfoort Machine Factory Bronswerk. Bronswerk made heating installations, refrigeration for ships, and pipelines. The new company would consist of three parts: Shipyard Wilton-Fijenoord, Machine Factory Wilton-Fijenoord, and Bronswerk. The holding company Becht en Dyserinck, which held 2.5 million of share capital in Bronswerk, would be liquidated. By mid December 1964, enough shareholders of Bronswerk and Becht en Dyserinck had agreed to trade their shares for shares in Wilton-Fijenoord. That same month, the shareholders of Fijenoord agreed to the merger in an extraordinary meeting.

The new company would be named Wilton-Fijenoord-Bronswerk NV (WFB) and was a holding company. It was intended to have three daughters: Dok- en werf maatschappij Wilton-Fijenoord NV, Machinefabrieken Wilton-Fijenoord NV, and Bronswerk. Later, these were to be only two: Dok- en werf maatschappij Wilton-Fijenoord NV for the activities related to shipping, and Bronswerk-Fijenoord NV for the land-based activities.

In 1964, the combination made a net profit of 4.73 million and paid a dividend of 12%. Even the shipbuilding activities were looking good with orders having been contracted at decent prices. In 1965, the results were more or less the same with again a dividend of 12%. The shipbuilding part started to construct oil platforms.

Meanwhile, the size of ships continued to increase. This applied especially to oil tankers. When the Suez Canal was first closed in 1956, ships of up to 35,000dwt were able to pass it. The closure forced ships to sail round Cape of Good Hope, dramatically increasing shipping cost. The answer was the super tanker. In 1959, the Universe Apollo of 104,500dwt (lt) was built. It was soon followed by others.

In the 1950s, oil tankers formed about half of the tonnage of new ships. No wonder that Wilton-Fijenoord-Bronswerk wanted to be able to repair, if not built such ships. For repairs, it already had the old floating drydock No. 4, which could lift ships of up to 90,000dwt. It had also started construction of a new graving dock called 'Dok 8'. This was intended for ships of up to 150,000dwt. On 21 June 1966, this graving dock was opened by Prince Bernard.

In 1966, Wilton-Fijenoord-Bronswerk results were still good with again a dividend of 12%. The maritime part of the company did 60% repairs and 40% shipbuilding. The board said it would leave the construction of series ships to others. It also said it thought about the construction of a new mega graving dock on the Maasvlakte. This would require an investment of 500 million. In 1967, Bronswerk-Fijenoord NV closed its iron foundry in Rotterdam. It was the last part of the old Fijenoord shipyard in Feijenoord that was still operational. In 1967, the company an almost equal profit and paid a dividend of 12%. However, the benefits of increased productivity were consistently cancelled by increased wages.

While results were satisfactory, the question of a new graving dock for supertankers was still open in early 1968. The required investment million was so big that the shipyards required government assistance. The government was prepared to give guarantees, but only for one drydock, not for two. Two parties made plans. One party was formed by the Verolme shipyards. The other party consisted of the four shipyards: Wilton-Fijenoord-Bronswerk, NDSM, Rotterdamsche Droogdok Maatschappij, and De Schelde. The plan of the four shipyards called for a wide graving dock for ships of 350,000dwt, that could later be extended to serve ships of 500,000dwt.

Verolme would win the contest for government subsidy for the Mammoth drydock by buying NDSM. By 1968, NDSM was by far the weakest of the Dutch shipbuilding companies. At the time, it specialized in building super tankers, but for years, it had operated at a loss. In June 1968, it became known that Verolme wanted to buy NDSM. In early July, the government announced that it would support Verolme by guaranteeing a soft loan from the Herstelbank of 75 million guilders. Verolme would also a 20 million guarantee from the government to finance the acquisition of NDSM.

In mid 1968, Wilton-Fijenoord-Bronswerk (WFB) would be torn up by Rijn-Schelde and WMF. This still had to do with the mammoth drydock plans. When it became known that Verolme Shipyards and NDSM would merge, WFB reacted by announcing that it would cooperate with Rijn-Schelde (Schelde Shipyard and Rotterdamsche Droogdok Maatschappij). However, in mid July a merger between WFB and Verenigde Machinefabrieken Stork-Werkspoor (VMF-Stork) was announced.

== Part of Rijn-Schelde (1968-1970) ==
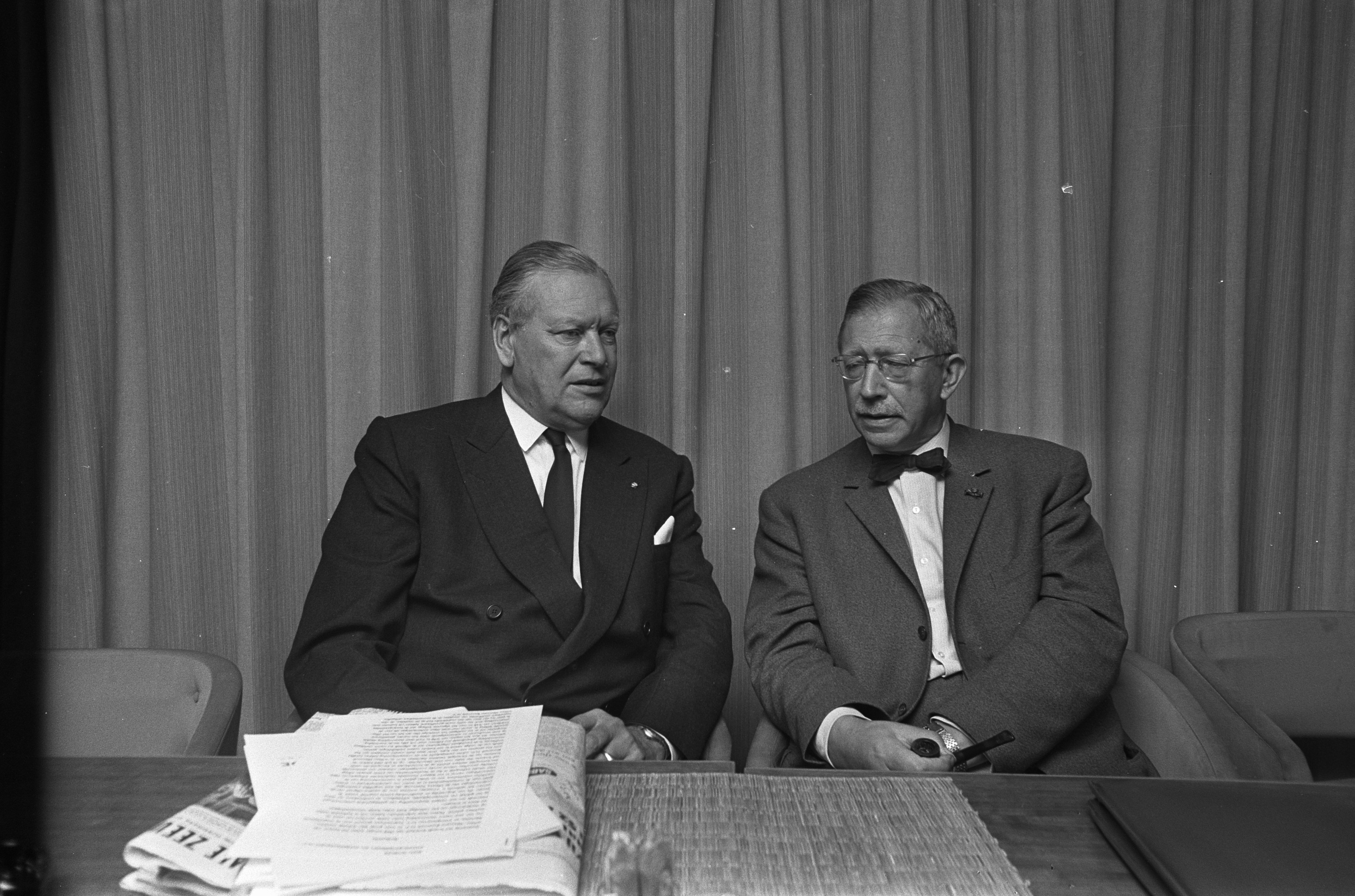
Hupkes (De Schelde) and V.d. Pols (RDM) 6 Sep. 1968

In early September 1968, Rijn-Schelde issued a bid on Wilton-Fijenoord-Bronswerk that was much higher than that of VMF-Stork. In a few days, the parties then agreed that the maritime part of WFB would go to Rijn-Schelde, while the land based part would go to WMF.

Rijn-Schelde would integrate Dok- en Werf-Maatschappij Wilton-Fijenoord into its business during 1969. It also planned to start construction of its own mammoth drydock on the Maasvlakte that year. It was disappointing that Wilton-Fijenoord operated at a loss in 1968. One of the first steps of the integration was the 1 August closure of Wilton-Fijenoord's repair shipyard at the Westkousdijk in Delfshaven, Rotterdam. There was also a re-organization that would move 144 employees from jobs in warehouses, offices, and maintenance to jobs in shipbuilding and -repair.

In September 1969, it became known that Verolme was in serious financial difficulty. It is said to have spent 22 million Dutch guilders (NLG; €133.01 million in 2024) on its mammoth drydock and 30 million Dutch guilders (NLG; €181.38 million in 2024) on NDSM. Verolme first said that the problems were completely due to NDSM, but it soon became clear that Verolme's Rozenburg Shipyard also operated at a huge loss.

== Part of Rijn-Schelde-Verolme (1971–1983) ==
In mid-April 1971, a government sponsored commission advised/decided to merge Verolme and Rijn-Schelde with retroactive effect to 1 January 1971. It meant that Wilton-Fijenoord became part of a large conglomerate with 30,000 employees.

The conglomerate squandered an enormous amount of government money on all kinds of projects, but failed to invest in modernizing its shipyards. Wilton-Fijenoord, got some breathing space when it got the order for the two Hai Lung-class submarines, which were laid down in December 1982.

In February 1983, RSV was granted an automatic stay. The government then urged for the dissolution of the company. Many daughter companies were confident that they could survived on their own feet. This also applied to Wilton-Fijenoord.

== Wilton-Fijenoord independent again (1983-1999) ==
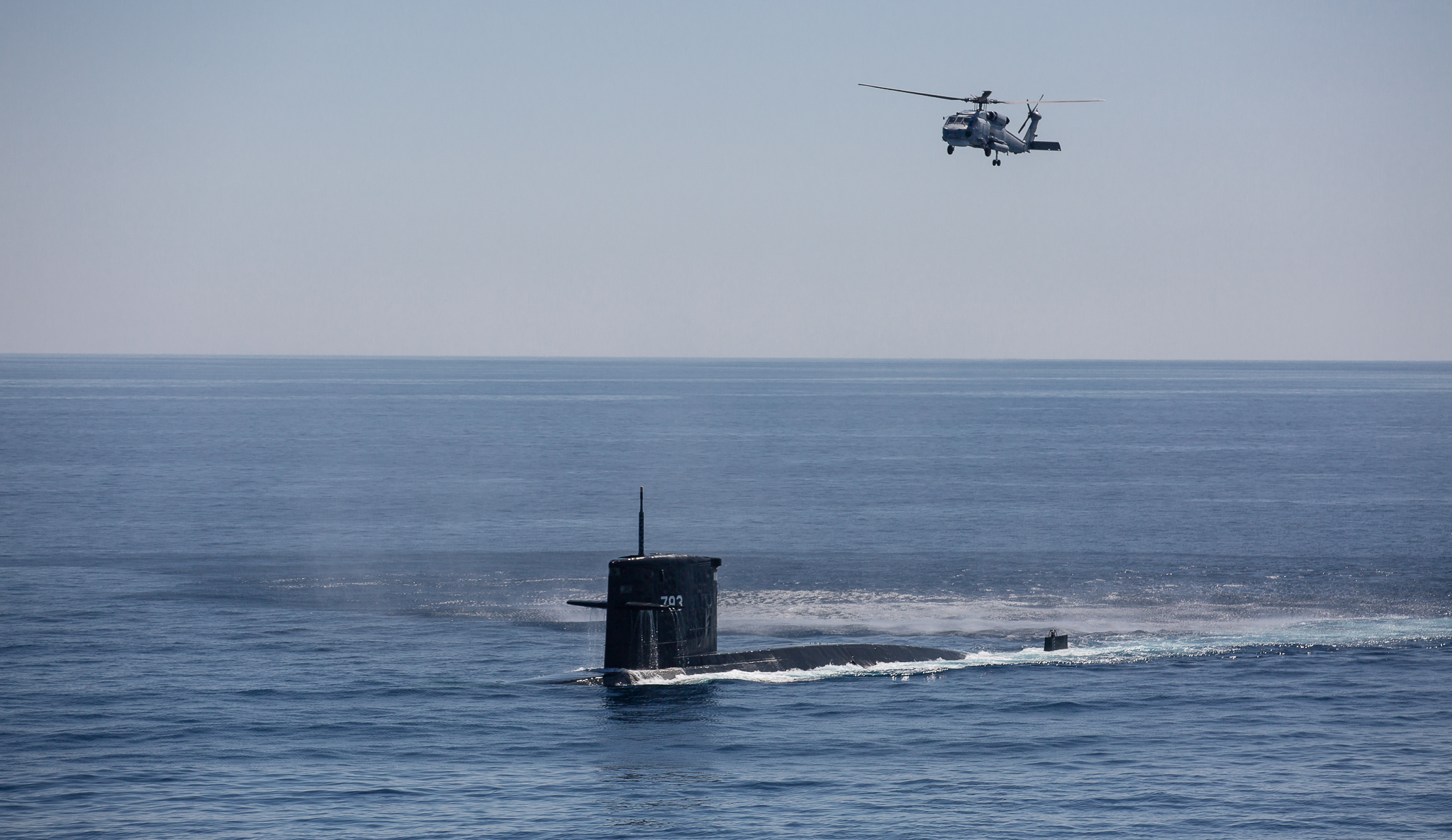
ROCN Hai Lung

In early 1983, Wilton-Fijenoord, still part of RSV, had way too little work. RSV planned to fire hundreds of Wilton's workers. In February 1983, the government plans to disassemble RSV included that Wilton-Fijenoord would only repair ships and that RDM would only build ships. The Rotterdam municipality then tried to save ship repair activities at RDM, but Wilton-Fijenoord reacted by offering 12 million for RDM's dry docks. This offer was also driven by fear that Boele's shipyard would get its hands on those docks. The biggest of these was the a 45,000t floating dry dock that had been bought in Southampton just after World War II. It was said that this prevented the creation of a new RDM repair shipyard. In the end, the two biggest of these dry docks would not end up at Wilton-Fijenoord.

While Wilton-Fijenoord continued to be troubled by the automatic stay, there was a national row over the possibility to build more submarines for Taiwan. The government also continued to push for an end to all shipbuilding at Wilton-Fijenoord and wanted to force a take-over by Damen Shipyards. In the end it was the municipality of Schiedam that saved Wilton-Fijenoord. It bought the terrain of the shipyard for 42 million guilders and then leased it back to the company. It was June 1984 before the government finally provided a loan of 25 million so Wilton-Fijenoord could get out of the automatic stay. This loan had become necessary, because the RSV holding still owed 240 million to WF, most of it consisting of advances that had been paid to WF by the Taiwanese government.

Over the period from June 1984 to 31 December 1984, Wilton-Fijenoord made a profit of 7.1 million guilders. By then a time bomb was ticking because in 1986 and 1987, the two submarines would be delivered. In 1985, profit increased to 13.7 million guilders, as the ship repair part was doing very well. In 1986, revenue and net profit dropped sharply to 2.7 million ay a revenue of 271.5 million.

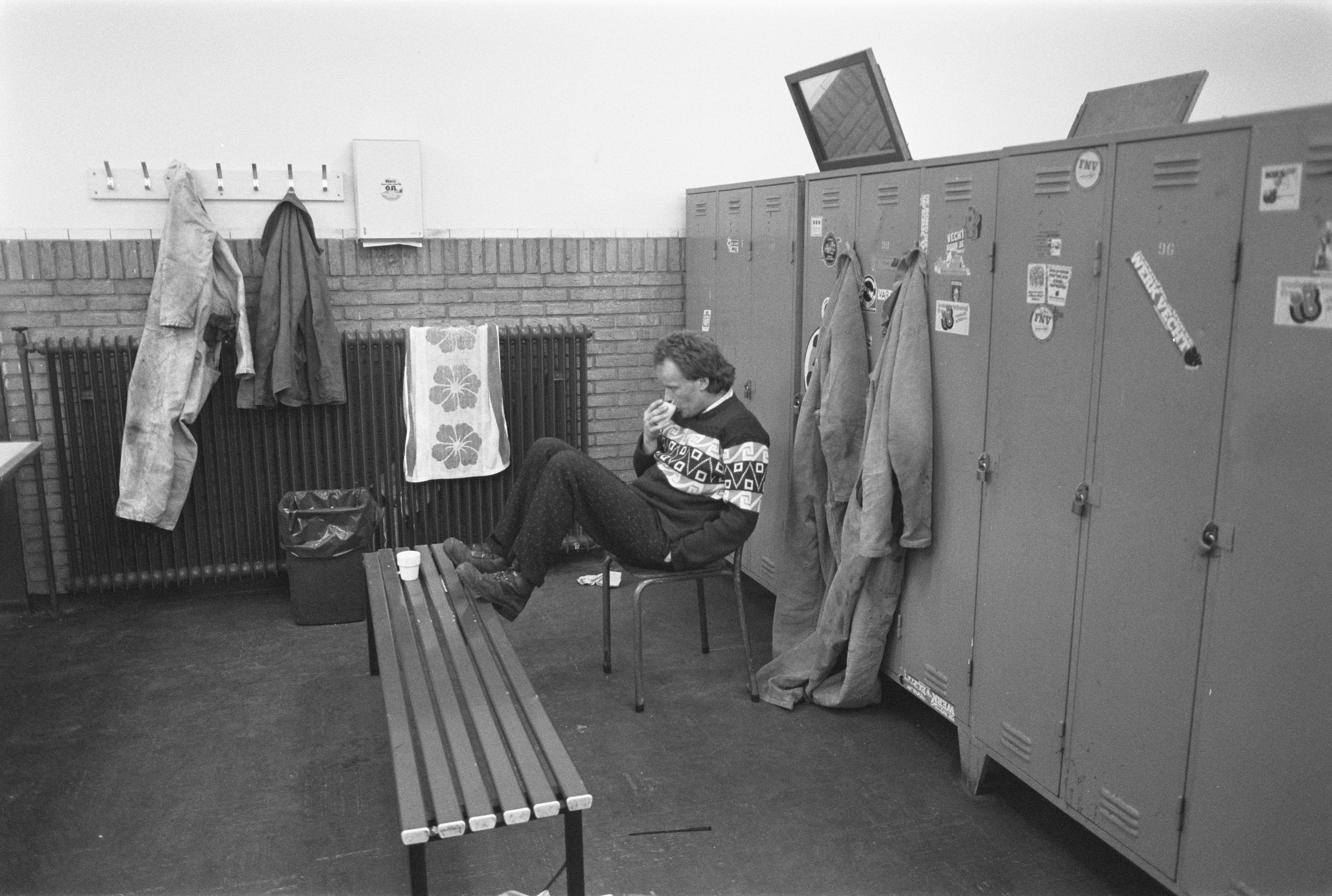
Lay-offs as WF quits shipbuilding, 15 Dec. 1987

In 1987, Wilton-Fijenoord surprised the market by buying its old competitor Verolme Botlek as well as the smaller shipyard Vlaardingen Oost Bedrijven (VOB). The idea was that the smallest ships could be repaired at VOB, big ships up to 150,000dwt could be repaired at Wilton-Fijenoord, and ships of over 150,000dwt could be repaired at Verolme's mammoth dock. WF's worker's council agreed on condition that the new daughters would remain financially separate entities. At the end of 1987, it also became clear that there was no future for Wilton-Fijenoord in Shipbuilding. Of WF's 1,500 employees, the 550 that worked in building ships lost their job in early 1988. Wilton-Fijenoord closed its last year as a combined shipbuilding and ship repair yard with a loss of 16.8 million guilders, but this was caused by 35 million of reorganization costs.

In 1988, Wilton-Fijenoord and its daughter Verolme Botlek made a profit of 24.1 million. Meanwhile Vlaardingen Oost Bedrijven (VOB) went into bankruptcy and was acquired by Damen Shipyards in Gorinchem. In 1989, WF had 1,080 employees and profit increased to 39 million.

In Spring 1990, Wilton-Fijenoord announced that it wanted to get back into shipbuilding. This was also possible, because it had mothballed its construction shipyard. Already in October 1990, it became known WF was talking to Verolme Hesuden about a merger. By December, all parties involved agreed that Verolme Scheepswerf Heusden (VSH) would become the third daughter of the WF-Holding company. In 1990, the profit of WF Holding grew to 44 million, excluding the 6.6 million profit of VSH.

In 1991, it became clear that shipyards in the former East Germany and Poland were becoming very competitive, producing at about half the price of Wilton-Fijenoord. WF nevertheless still made a 20.8 million guilder profit. Over 1992, the profit of WF decreased to 10.1 million guilders.

In 1993 it became clear that WF was suffering from a bad global repair market, low wage competition from Poland and the Baltic, and subsidies in Germany. That year, WF made a loss of 7 million guilders. The core of WF's new problem was that it no longer got the major repair jobs that were crucial maintain a steady repair capability. In 1994 the loss increased to 25 million guilders. WF tried to change its business model, fired 251 employees and tried to reorient to the offshore industry. It did not suffice, and in October 1995 a plan was announced that would shrink the Schiedam shipyard from 440 to 300 employees. In the end, the loss over 1995 was 36 million. In 1996, this was only 0.9 million, but by then it was known that the holding would lose millions on the construction of WD Fairway at VSH. During 1997, the situation of WF-Holding became desperate because of the losses on WD Fairway and her sister Queen of the Netherlands.

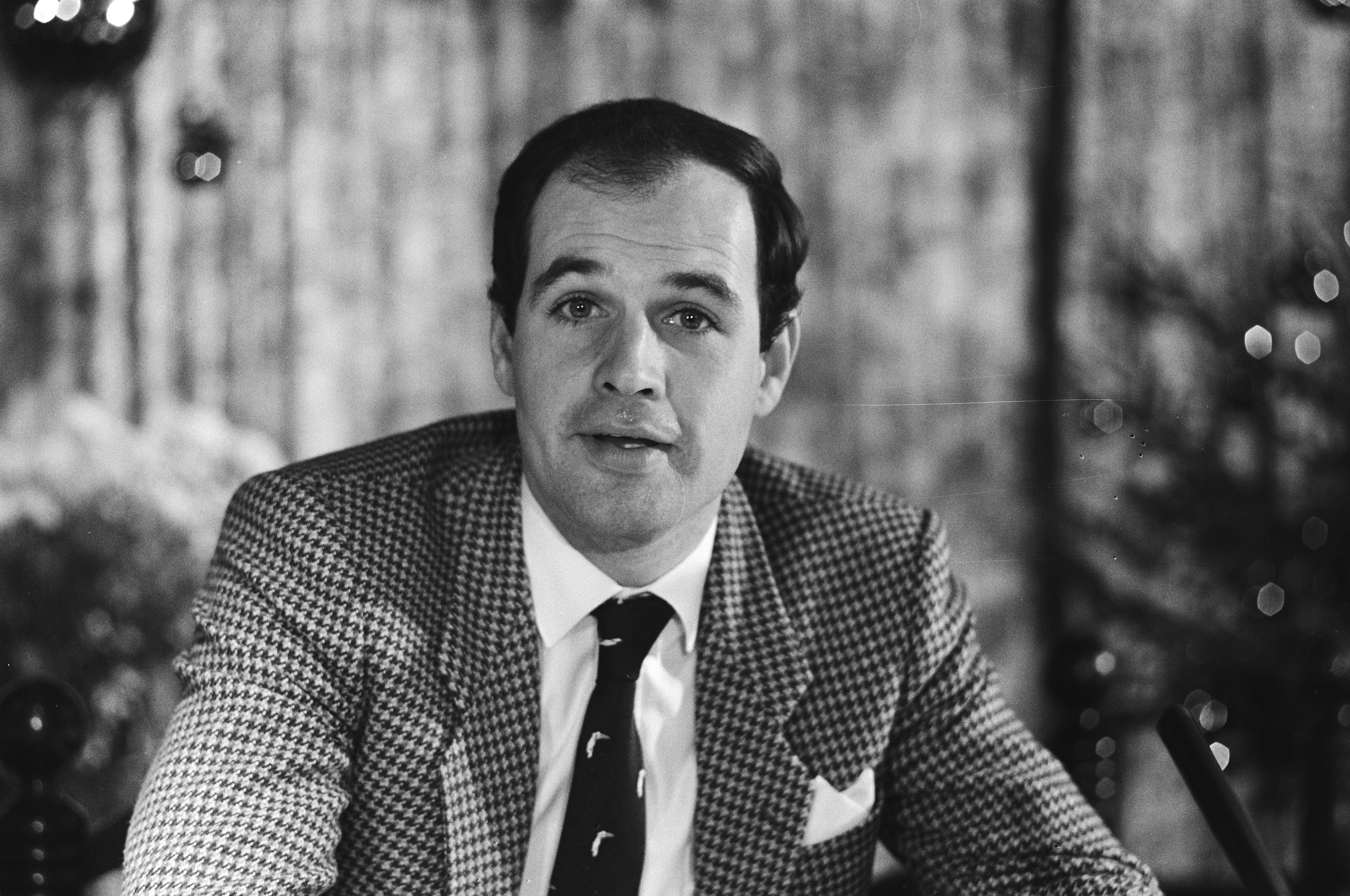
RDM Technology's Joep van den Nieuwenhuyzen

By early 1998, WFH needed 40 million guilders to restore its capital. The situation was complicated because WFH was jointly liable for part of the debts of Verolme Heusden and Wilton-Fijenoord. In May 1998, RDM Technology holding bought WFH.

RDM Technology holding B.V. was owned by Joep van den Nieuwenhuyzen. He was primarily interested in Verolme Botlek. RDM paid one guilder for WFH, but had to put 40 million into the company as part of the sale. RDM said to already have an agreement with Yssel-Vliet-Combinatie (YVC) in Capelle aan den IJssel, to sell Wilton-Fijenoord to YVC as soon as the deal would be completed. Of the 40 million guilders that RDM paid, 20 million went to Verolme Botlek, obviously freeing it from the joint liability. The other half was put into a bank account that would be blocked until the debts of Verolme Heusden and Wilton-Fijenoord were settled.

The price for the sale of Wilton-Fijenoord to YVC would be about 10 million guilders, being the value of the grounds and buildings at Schiedam. The deal did not go smoothly, because by mid-November negotiations were still in progress. On 29 December 1998, the dissolution of WFH continued with the bankruptcy of Verolme Heusden.

== Rotterdam United Shipyards (1999-2003) ==
In late January 1999, WFH finally sold Wilton-Fijenoord to Yssel-Vliet-Combinatie (YVC). The new name of the shipyard would be Rotterdam United Shipyards.

YVC soon got into trouble. In June 1999, it asked for an automatic stay for its YVC IJsselwerf in Capelle aan den IJssel and Groot-Ammers. Rotterdam United Shipyards and YVC Bolnes were not affected by this. In September, the IJsselwerf was bought by Van der Giessen de Noord.

Rotterdam United Shipyards did not succeed in becoming a profitable company. In March 2001, it cut 52 of the remaining 322 jobs. This measure soon proved inadequate and even more lay-offs were planned. In early October 2001, another round of lay-offs was to further reduce the number of employees from 270 to 169.

Also in 2001, the shipyard sold its 192 by 40 m drydock Dok 5 to the Sultan of Dubai. It was to lift the casco of his 162 by 22 m yacht Platinum. The whole would then be lifted by the MV Blue Marlin and brought to Dubai.

== Part of Damen (2001) ==
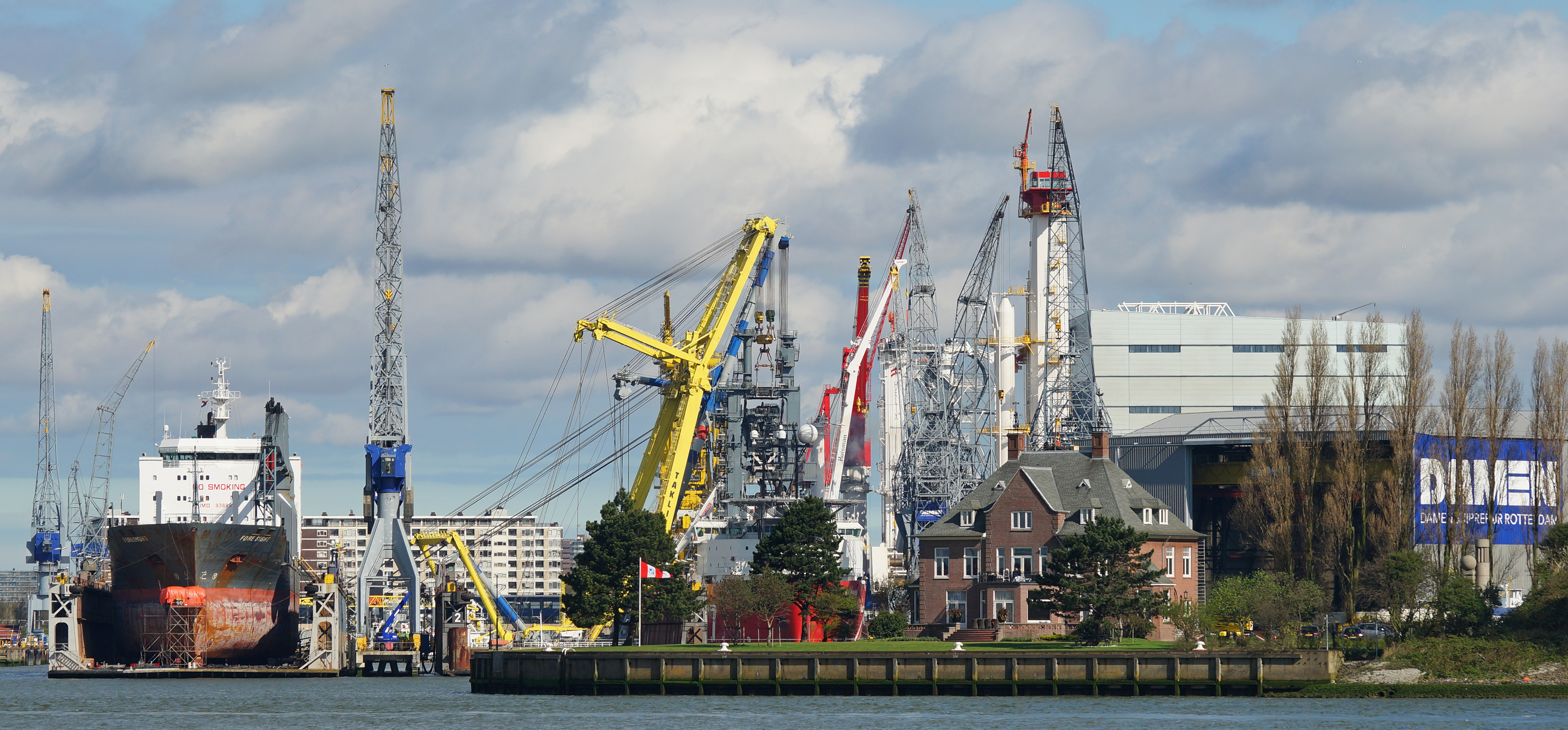
Damen's floating drydocks and the old directors' villa, 2016

In late 2001, the shipyard was acquired by Damen Group. Damen currently uses the eastern part of the large terrain (see floor plan) that was once used by Wilton-Fijenoord. This includes the now covered Dok 6, the still open-air Dok 7, and the large Dok 8. There are also two floating dry docks, but these seem to come from elsewhere. There are four berths where ships can moor without being put dry.

Other parts of the large terrain is now in use with companies like Huisman Equipment and Mammoet.

== Ships built ==
- Passenger liners:
  - Fairstar, launched in 1964 for Sitmar Line
  - Maasdam,launched in 1920 for Holland America Line
  - Maasdam, launched in 1952 for Holland America Line
  - Ryndam, launched in 1951 for Holland American Line
  - Statendam (IV), launched in 1956 for Holland America Line
- Whaling factory:
  - Willem Barendsz (II), launched in 1955
- Tankships:
  - J.B. Aug. Kessler, launched in 1902 and 29 others built for Shell Royal Dutch
  - Rapana, for Anglo-Saxon Petroleum
  - Eulota, launched in 1936 for Bataafsche Petroleum Maatschappij
  - Elusa, launched in 1936 for Bataafsche Petroleum Maatschappij
  - Eulima, launched in 1936 for Bataafsche Petroleum Maatschappij
  - Nederland, launched in 1937 for Nederlandsche Pacific Petroleum Maatschappij (Standard Oil of California)
  - Poitou, launched in 1954 for Société Française de Transports Pétroliers
- Cargo/passenger ships:
  - Zaandam, launched in 1938 for Holland America Line
  - Camphuys, launched in 1949 for Koninklijke Java China Paketvaart Lijnen

=== Warships ===
Cruisers

- HNLMS De Ruyter (1935), a unique cruiser launched in 1935
- HNLMS De Ruyter, a De Zeven Provinciën-class cruiser launched in 1944

Destroyers

- German destroyer T61, a Flottentorpedoboot 1940 destroyer
- HNLMS Gelderland (D811), a Holland-class destroyer
- HNLMS Overijssel (D815), a Friesland-class destroyer

Submarines

- HNLMS O 19, an O 19-class submarine
- HNLMS O 20, an O 19-class submarine
- HNLMS O 25, an O 21-class submarine
- HNLMS Potvis (S804), a Potvis-class submarine
- HNLMS Tonijn (S805), a Potvis-class submarine
- Hai Lung, ROC Navy
- Hai Hu, ROC Navy

Frigates

- HNLMS Philips van Almonde (F823), a Kortenaer-class frigate
- HNLMS Bloys van Treslong (F824), a Kortenaer-class frigate
- KRI Fatahillah (361), a Fatahillah-class frigate for the Indonesian Navy
- KRI Malahayati (362), a Fatahillah-class frigate for the Indonesian Navy
- KRI Nala (363), a Fatahillah-class frigate for the Indonesian Navy
- Elli (F450) and Limnos (F451) – frigates for the Greek Navy

Minesweepers

- HNLMS Dokkum, a Dokkum-class minesweeper
- HNLMS Overijssel, a Dokkum-class minesweeper
- HNLMS Roermond, a Dokkum-class minesweeper
