= Miss Nalan =

- Occupation: Poet
- Father: Mingju
- Relatives: Nalan Kuixu, Nalan Xingde

Miss Nalan (c.1680 - c.1705) was a Chinese poet in the Kangxi period of the Qing Dynasty. She is known only by her surname, Nalan (Chinese: 纳兰). She is the earliest Manchu woman whose poetry collection has survived.

Miss Nalan was the youngest daughter of Nalan Ming-zhu, a wealthy imperial official who served as Grand Secretary. Her older brothers Nalan Xing-de and Nalan Kui-xu were well regarded poets. Her poetry collection was published after her death by her nephew Yong-shou, the son of her brother Kui-fang who was adopted by Kui-xu following Kui-fang's early death.

Only a single copy of her poetry collection, Poetry Drafts from Leisure after Needlework (Xiuyu shigao), remains. It contains 120 poems and a preface by Yong-shou, mostly nature poems largely focusing on northern China with some historical poems. Her poem "The Eagle" is frequently cited by modern critics.
