= Sudirohusodo-class hospital ship =

Indonesian Navy hospital ship

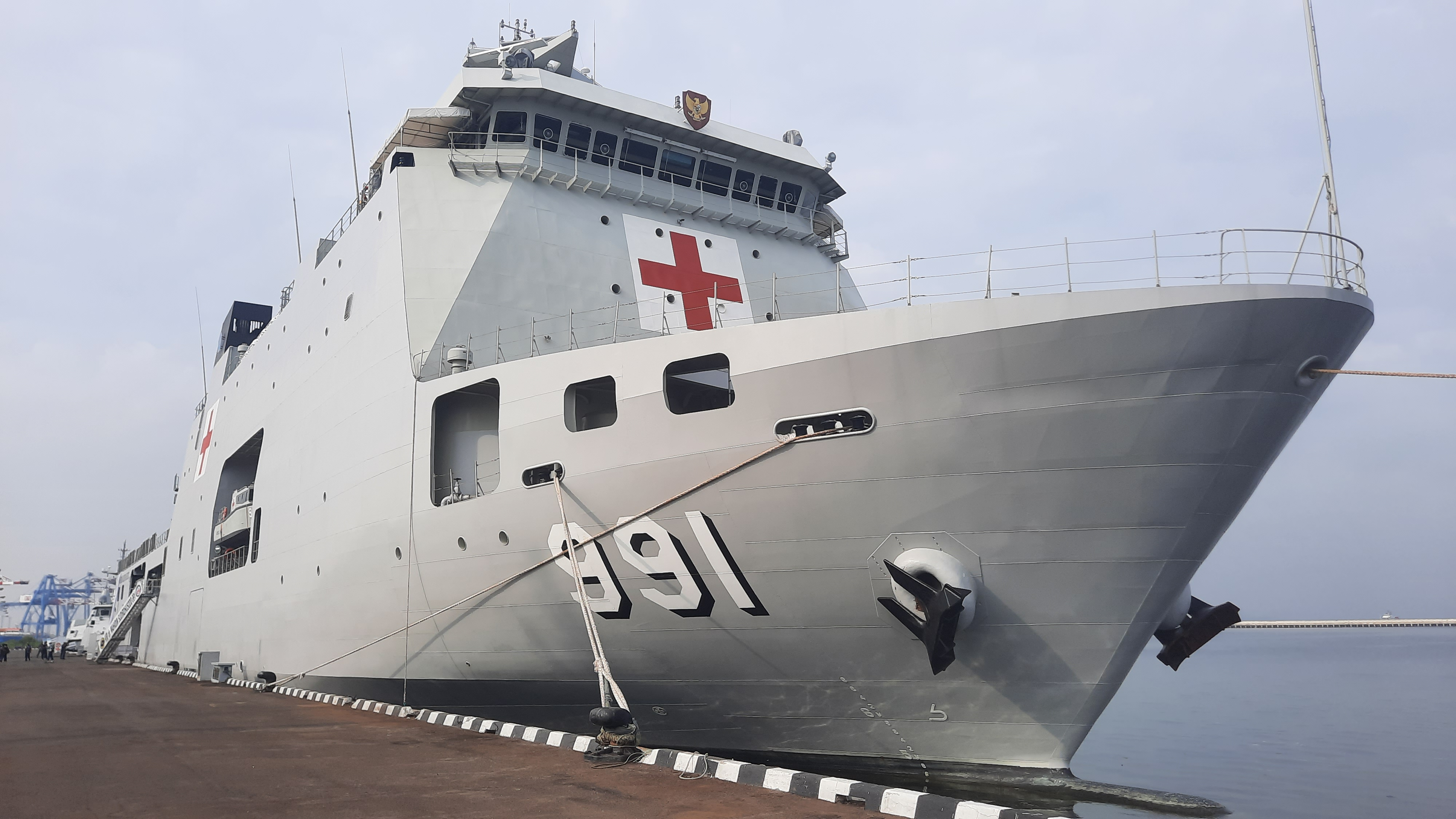
- KRI dr. Wahidin Sudirohusodo (991) during the Ship-naming Ceremony, on 3 November 2022, at Pondok Dayung Pier, North Jakarta.

Class overview
- Name: dr. Wahidin Sudirohusodo class
- Builders: PT PAL, Surabaya, Indonesia
- Operators: Indonesian Navy
- Preceded by: KRI dr. Soeharso
- Built: 2019–2023
- In commission: 2022–present
- Planned: 2
- Active: 2

General characteristics
- Class & type: Hospital ship
- Displacement: 7,290 t (7,170 long tons)
- Length: 124 m (406 ft 10 in)
- Beam: 21.8 m (71 ft 6 in)
- Speed: 18 knots (33 km/h; 21 mph)
- Range: 10,000 nmi (19,000 km; 12,000 mi) at 12 knots (22 km/h; 14 mph)
- Endurance: 30 days
- Capacity: 643 people
- Sensors & processing systems: Terma SCANTER 6002
- Aviation facilities: Landing pad for 2 x helicopter Helicopter hangar

The dr. Wahidin Sudirohusodo class or Sudirohusodo-class is a class of hospital ships built by PAL Indonesia in Surabaya for the Indonesian Navy.

== History ==
In 2019, Indonesia's military development policy entered its third phase within the Minimum Essential Force (MEF) Policy framework. One of the MEF requirements for the Indonesian Navy includes the provision of hospital auxiliary ships.

Before the Sudirohusodo-class, the Indonesian Navy already used two hospital ships; KRI dr. Soeharso (990) and KRI Semarang (594). However, both ships were initially designed and built as the Landing Platform Dock (LPD); where KRI dr. Soeharso was re-designated to became a Multi-purpose Hospital Ship in 2007, while KRI Semarang was assigned to be a Hospital Assistance Ship for temporary in 2019 due to her basic function and purposes being supposed to be the addition of Landing Platform Dock for the Indonesian Navy. Therefore the Indonesian Navy needed another ships that were designed and built from the start specifically for hospital ship purposes, that are mobile and can be moved anytime to the disaster affected areas to carry out disaster emergency response, and for other humanitarian activities.

The first steel cutting for the lead ship was carried out on 9 July 2019, and the second ship was carried out on 10 September 2020 at PT PAL, Surabaya. The lead ship in the class KRI dr. Wahidin Sudirohusodo (991) was commissioned on 14 January 2022, and the second ship KRI dr. Radjiman Wedyodiningrat (992) was commissioned on 19 January 2023. As per June 2024, both ships in the class has been repainted white by PAL in accordance with the IV Geneva Convention and The San Remo Manual on International Law Applicable to Armed Conflicts at Sea.

== Design ==
The Sudirohusodo-class uses the same general hull design as that of the Indonesian Navy's Makassar-class landing platform docks. It has a length of 124 metres, beam of 21.8 metres, and displacement of around 7,290 tonnes. A pair of 5,420kW main engines could propel the hospital ship to a speed of 18 knots. With cruising speed 12 knots it can reach range of 10,000 nautical miles or a maximum endurance of 30 days, ensuring sustained sea-based medical support for deployed Indonesian forces as well as civilians in need. Like the Makassar-class which is based, the ship is also designed to have a flight deck for two helicopters and a hangar for one helicopter to support the air transportation or air medical evacuation purposes.

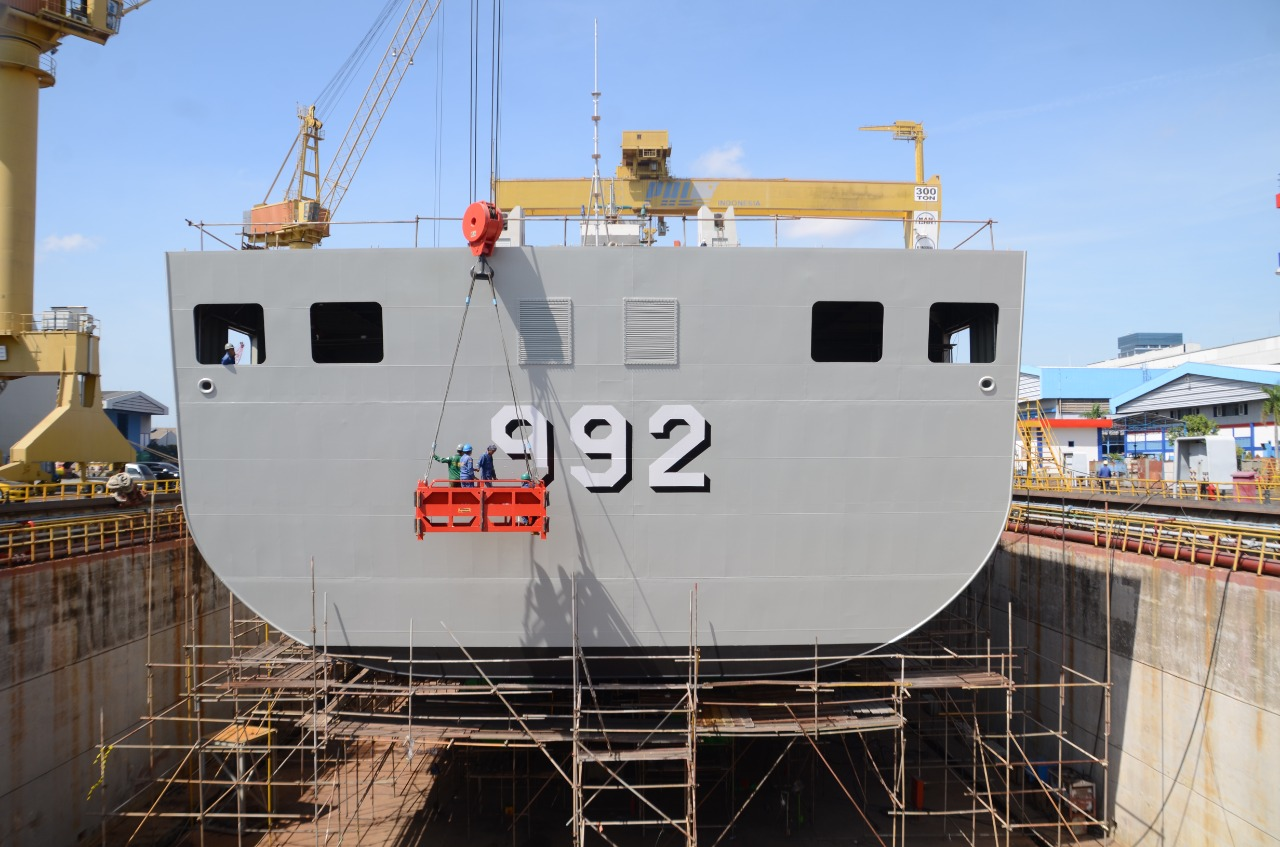
The stern section of a Sudirohusodo-class ship KRI dr. Radjiman Wedyoningrat (992) during her construction process without the well deck and stern gate/ramp.

Modifications to allow the ship to perform the floating hospital role include the removal of all armament, also the removal of well deck with its stern gate/ramp to accommodate the medical infrastructure and facilities inside the ship, in order to increase the capacity and capabilities related to her role as hospital auxiliary ship.

Due to the nature of big ship requires time for docking and undocking, the ship is also designed with evacuation-at-sea infrastructure on the port and starboard to accommodate the davit system with its evacuation-at-sea equipments; such as ambulance boats, LCVP and RHIB; speeding up the evacuation-at-sea process from and to the hospital ship.

== Characteristics ==
=== Technical ===
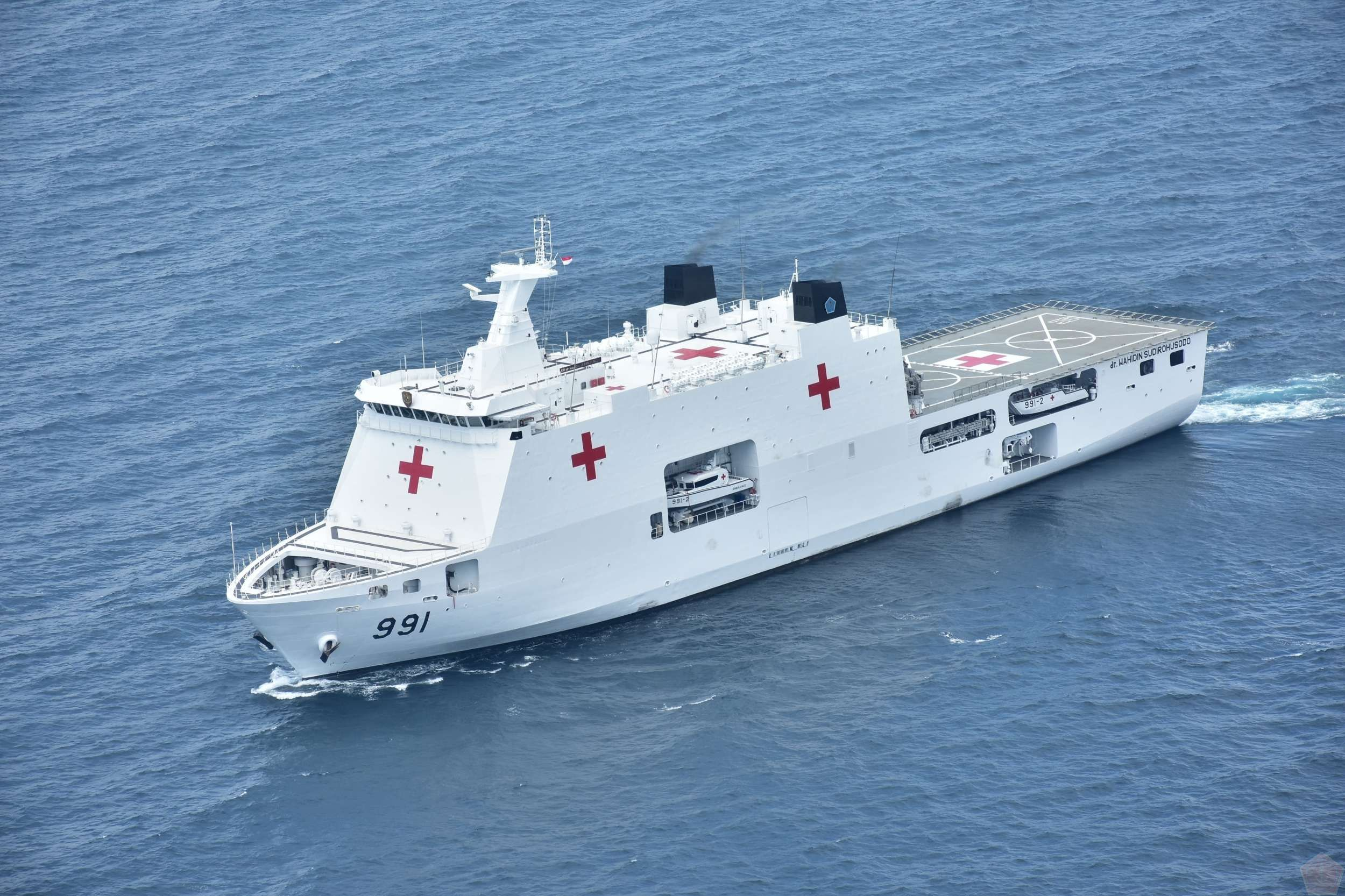
KRI dr. Wahidin Sudirohusodo (991) conducted an Air Medical Evacuation exercise, near Madura Island, Thursday, 1 August 2024.

Ships in the class have a length of 124 m (406 ft 10 in) and a beam of 21.8 m (71 ft 6 in), a displacement of 7,290 tonnes (7,170 long tons). They have a maximum speed of 18 knots (33 km/h; 21 mph), a cruising speed of 14 knots (26 km/h; 16 mph), and an economical speed of 12 knots (22 km/h; 14 mph). The vessels can sail up to 30 days and 10,000 nautical miles (19,000 km; 12,000 mi).

=== Capacity ===
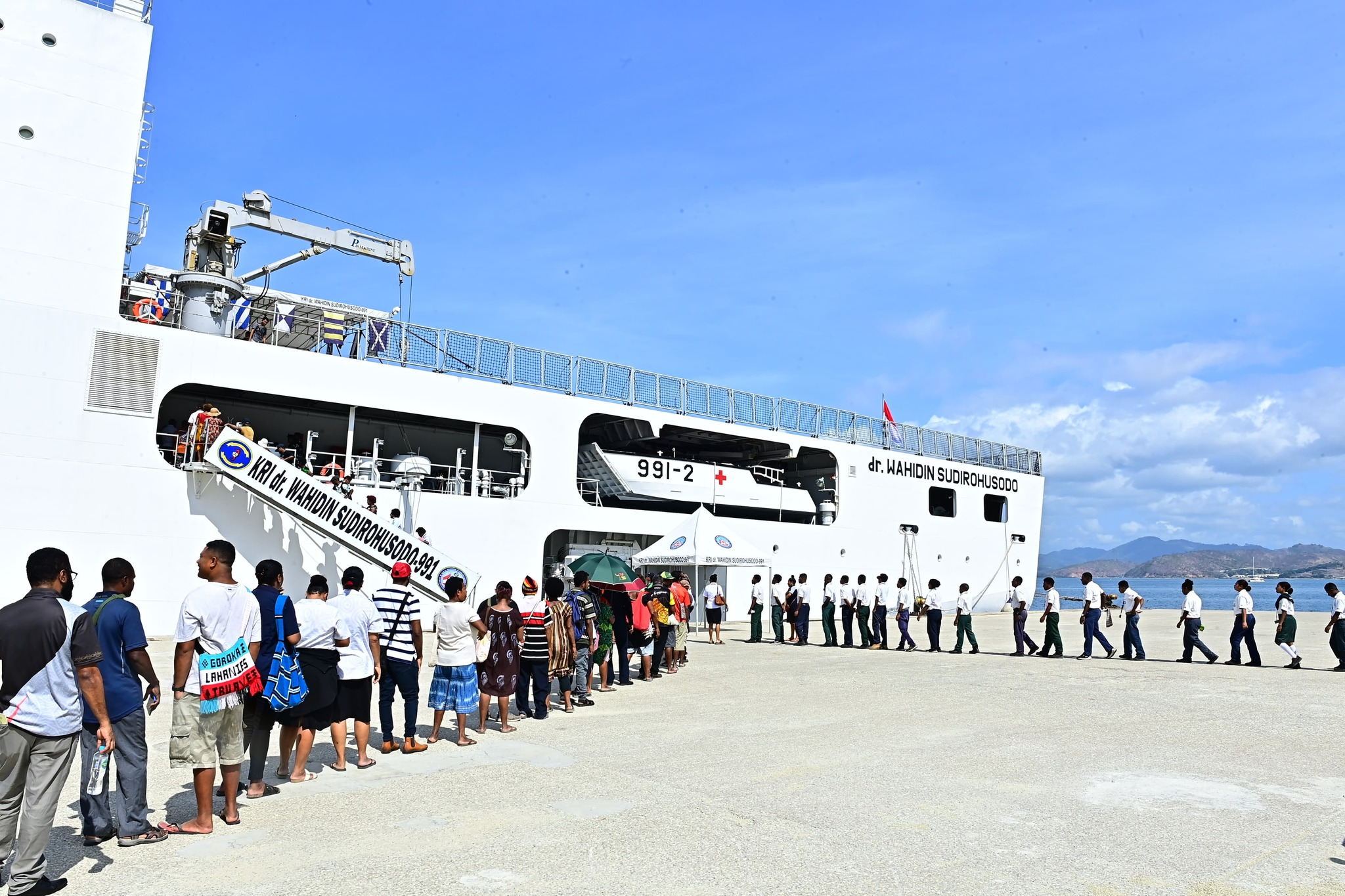
KRI dr. Wahidin Sudirohusodo docked at Port Moresby, Papua New Guinea to provide healthcare services for PNG citizens, 18 November 2024.

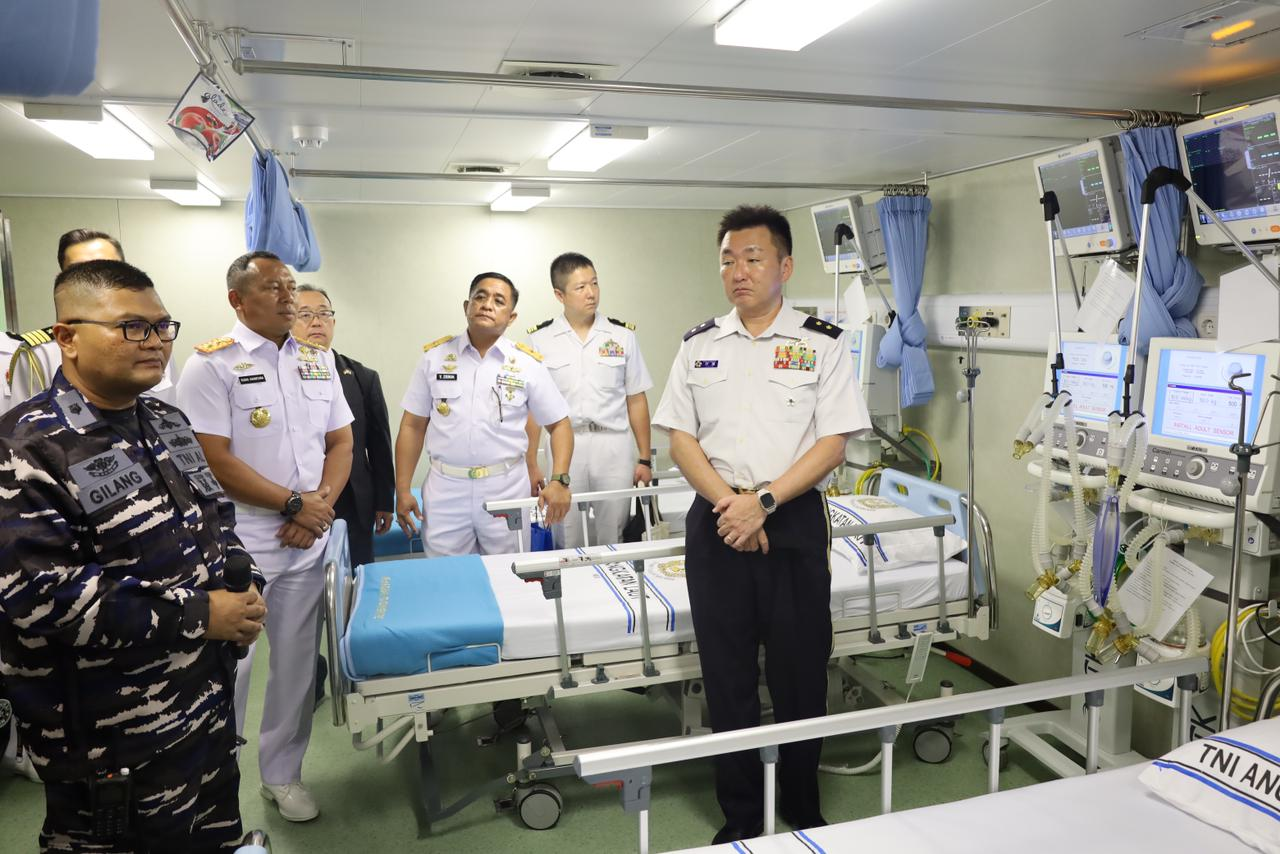
KRI dr. Radjiman Wedyodiningrat (992) received a visit from the Japanese Ministry of Defense delegation, 15 October 2025.

With displacement of full load 7,290 tons, the capacity of ship in the class can carry up to 643 personnels, 159 patients (or 124 Beds, additional 350 Beds in Emergency Case), 4 ambulances (OFE), 3 mobile hospitals (OFE), 1 mobile decompression (OFE), 1 mobile X Ray (OFE) as well as 2 LCVP units, 1 RHIB unit, 2 Ambulance Boat units, and can carry 3 helicopters with MTOWs of 11 tonnes each. (Note: Owner Furnished Equipment (OFE) is a practice in construction and projects where the project owner buys and provides specific equipment and materials directly to the contractor for installation.)

=== Capabilities ===
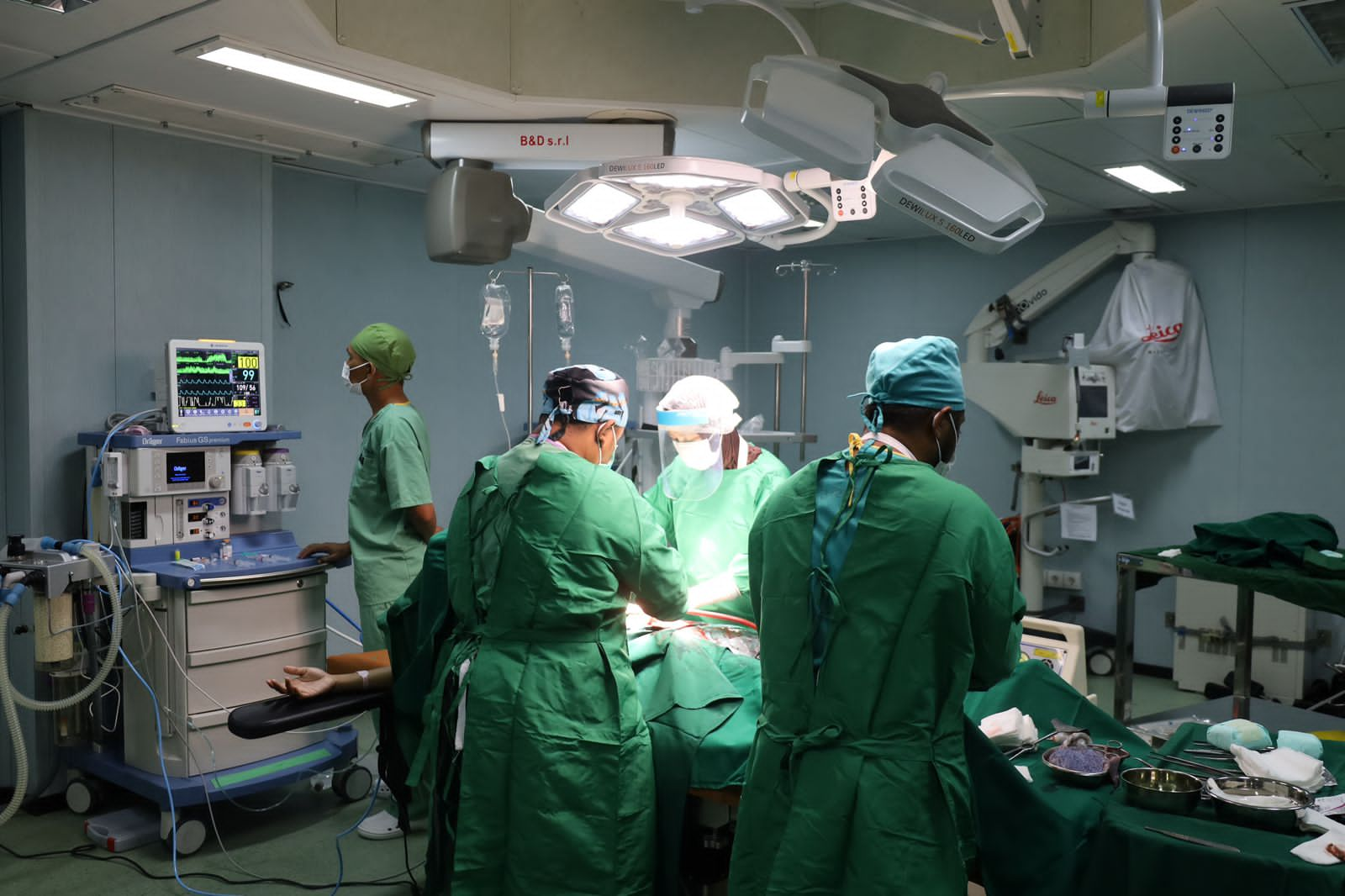
The medical team on the KRI dr. Wahidin Sudirohusodo (991) carry out C-section surgical procedure on a patient, 24 November 2022.

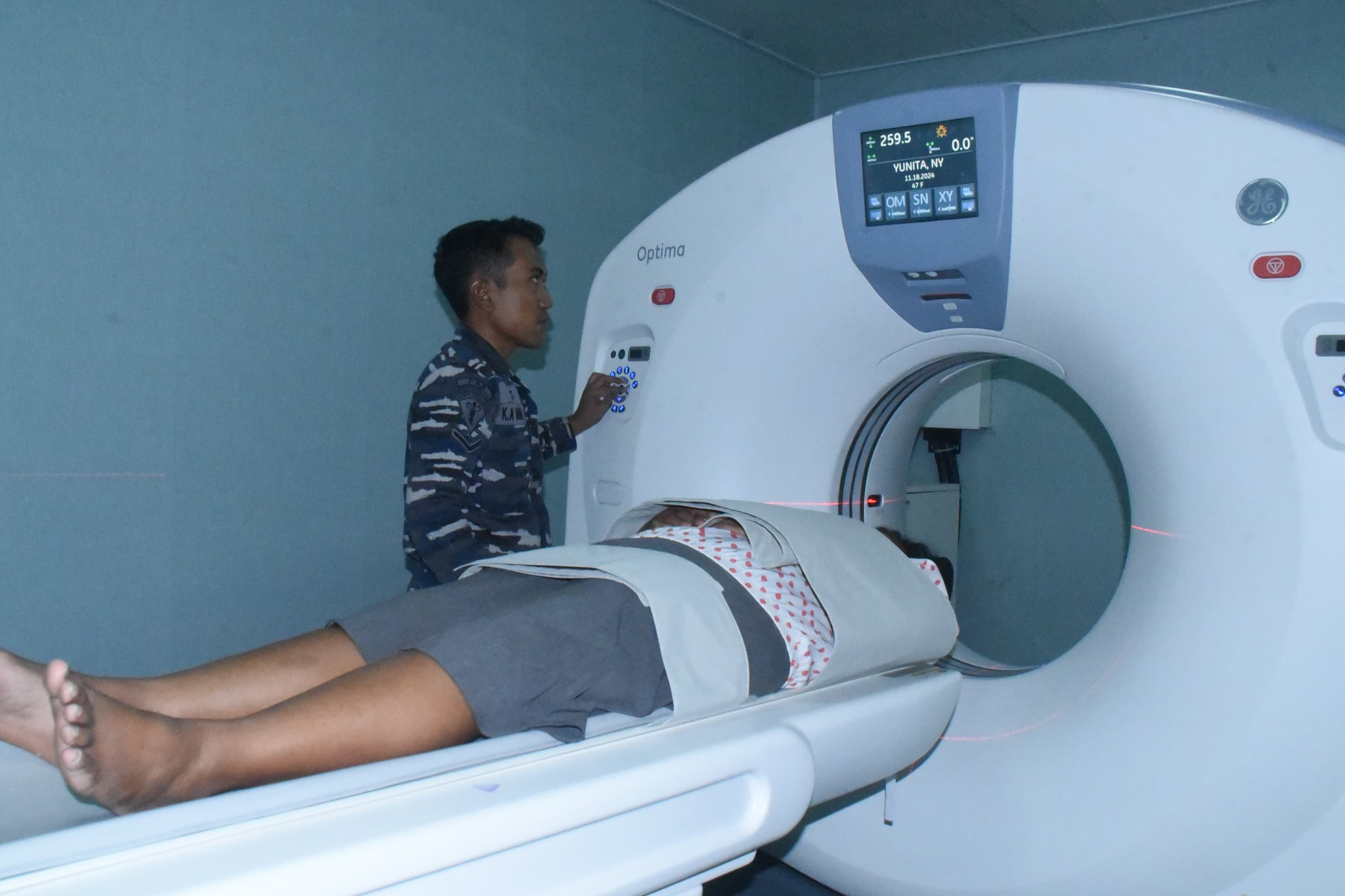
Port Visit Task Force health team providing the CT Scan services to a PNG citizen aboard KRI dr. Wahidin Sudirohusodo, 18 November 2024.

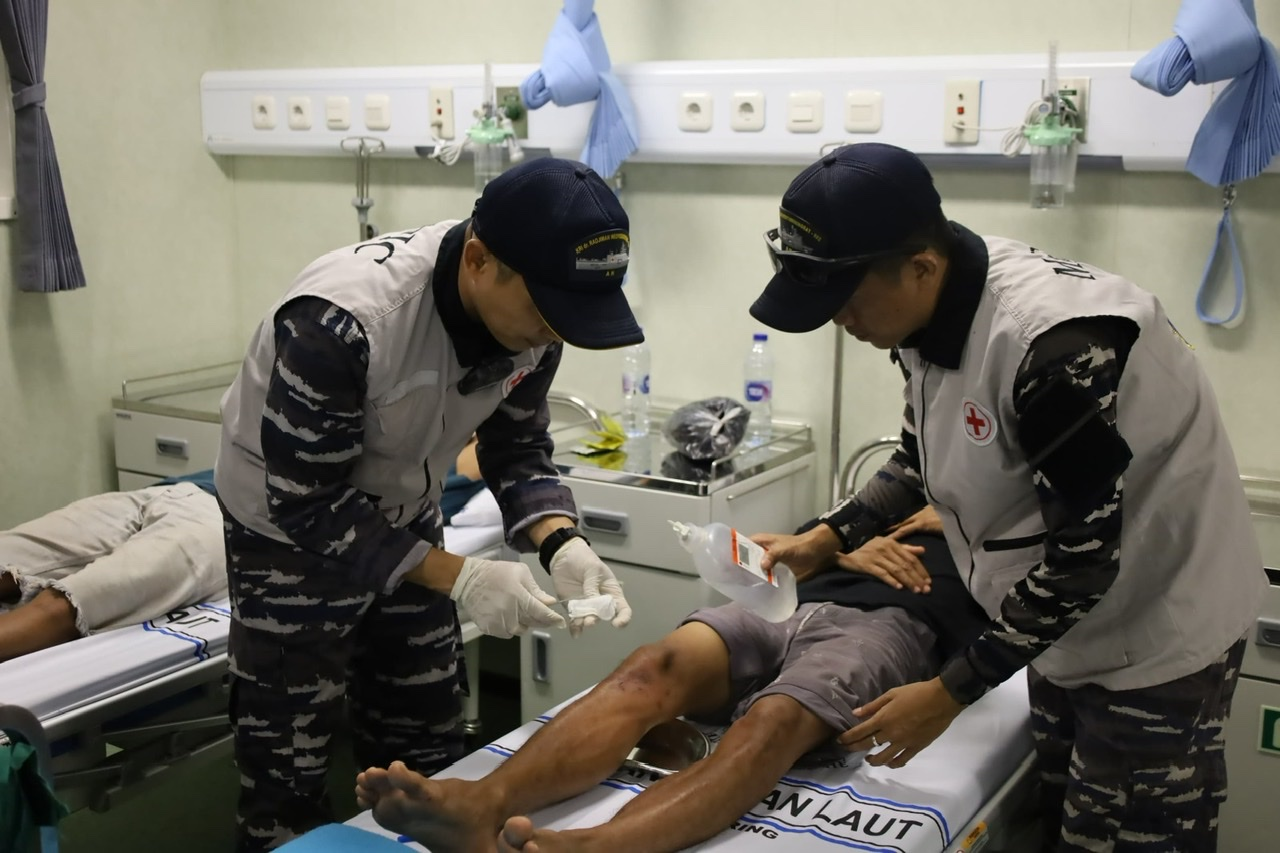
KRI dr. Radjiman Wedyoningrat (992) medical personnel evacuate and treat victims of sinking ship KM Maju Jaya, in the northern waters of Bangka Island, Friday, 11 July 2025.

Ships in the class is facilitated with 2 Emergency Rooms, 5 Operating Rooms (+ Pre/ Post) that can accommodate 12 different types of operations, Intensive Care Unit (ICU), High Care Unit (HCU), delivery room & baby room, Radiology (X-ray & CT-scanner), Pharmacy, 8 Polyclinics, a morgue and Laboratory.

== Ships in the class ==
Name	Hull no.	Builder	Laid down	Launched	Commissioned	Status
dr. Wahidin Sudirohusodo	991	PT PAL Indonesia (Persero)	14 October 2019	7 January 2021	14 January 2022	Active
dr. Radjiman Wedyodiningrat	992	PT PAL Indonesia (Persero)	21 January 2021	15 August 2022	19 January 2023	Active

== Gallery ==
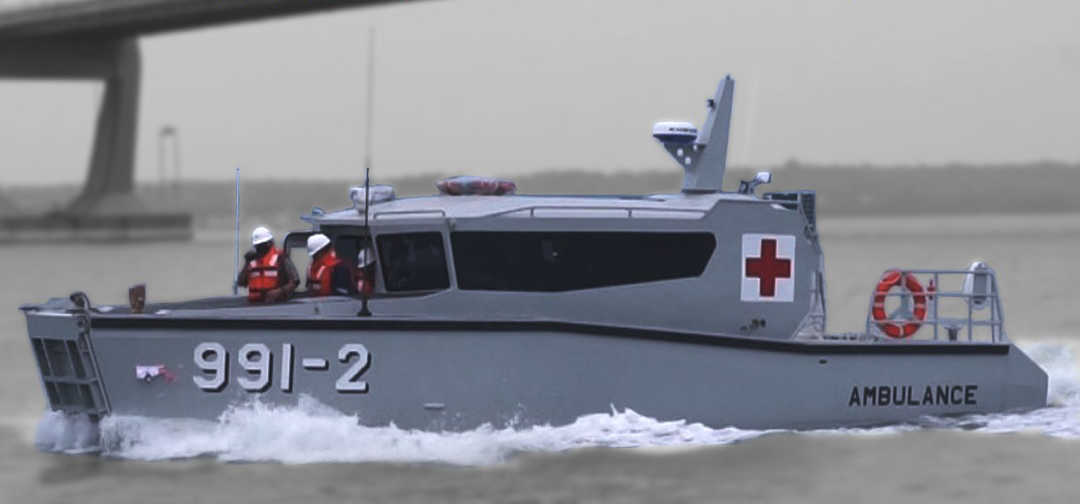
Ambulance boat of the KRI dr. Wahidin Sudirohusodo during its trial.

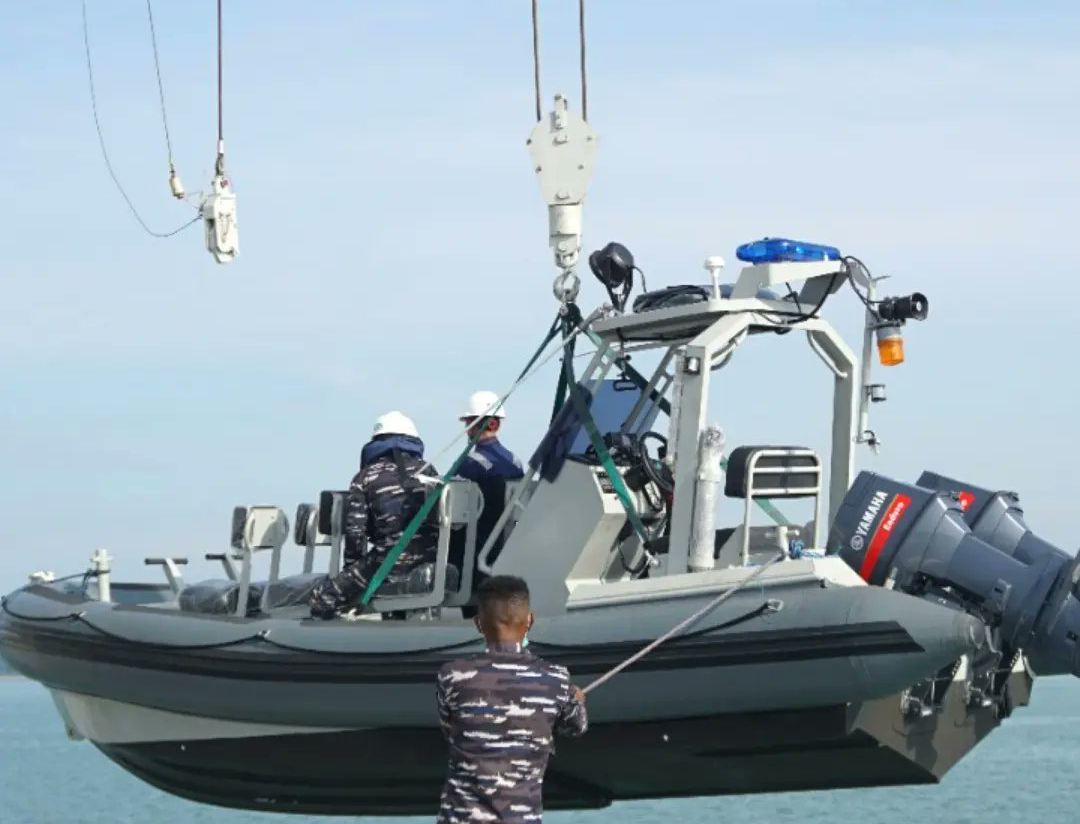
RHIB of the KRI dr. Wahidin Sudirohusodo during Hands On exercise.

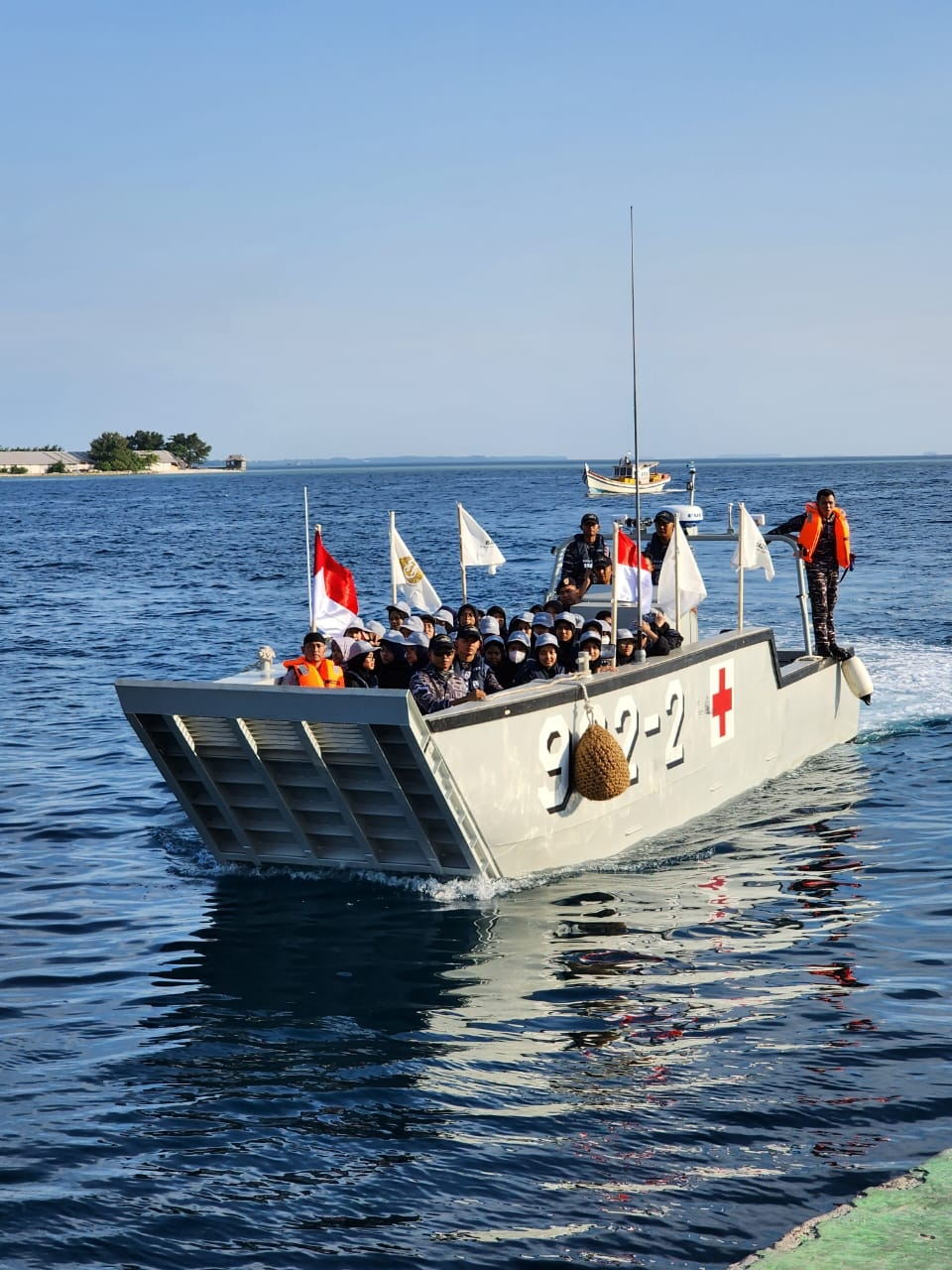
LCVP 992-2 of the KRI dr. Radjiman Wedyoningrat carrying students to Pramuka Island, 10 April 2023.

== See also ==
- KRI dr. Soeharso
- KRI Semarang (594)
