= Setiawan Djody =

Indonesian businessman

- Born: 13 March 1949 (age 77); Surakarta, Central Java, Indonesia
- Education: Wharton School; University of California, Berkeley
- Occupations: Businessman; Musician
- Spouse: Etty Djody
- Relatives: Wahidin Soedirohoesodo (Grandfather)

Kanjeng Pangeran Haryo Salahuddin Setiawan Djodi Nur Hadiningrat, also known as Setiawan Djody (born 13 March 1949 in Surakarta, Central Java, Indonesia) is an Indonesian businessman and guitarist.

== Early life ==
Setiawan Djody was born on March 13, 1949, on Surakarta, Central Java. He was the grandson of the Indonesian National Hero Wahidin Soedirohoesodo.

Djody was a Wharton School graduate in 1974 and got the S-2 Philosophy from the University of California, Berkeley.

== Musical career ==
Djody was an expert in playing guitar and was also known as an avid in music. Setiawan Djody along with Iwan Fals and W.S. Rendra formed the musical group SWAMI. Later on, he again with Iwan Fals formed another musical band group Kantata Takwa, with Djody as its guitarist and Iwan as its leading vocalist.

Setiawan Djody was listed by Rolling Stone as one of Asia's top guitarists.

== Business career ==
Setiawan Djody is the chairman of Setdco Group in Indonesia, Setdco being named after his own name.

The majority of its investments are in the oil, media and agricultural industries, including telecommunications. In 1994, MegaTech, a supercars engined company and a subsidiary of Setdco, purchase Lamborghini when it was sold by Chrysler company and its ownership was taken over by MegaTech.

Setiawan Djody was listed as one of the 150 richest Indonesians by Forbes 2007 magazine. He is also active in the business of shipping and has several shipping companies.

== Personal life ==
Djody received a liver transplantation donor from daughter Shri Jehan Djody, but in May 2011 he has made Kantata Barock concert.
