= KRI dr. Radjiman Wedyodiningrat =

Hospital ship of Indonesian Navy

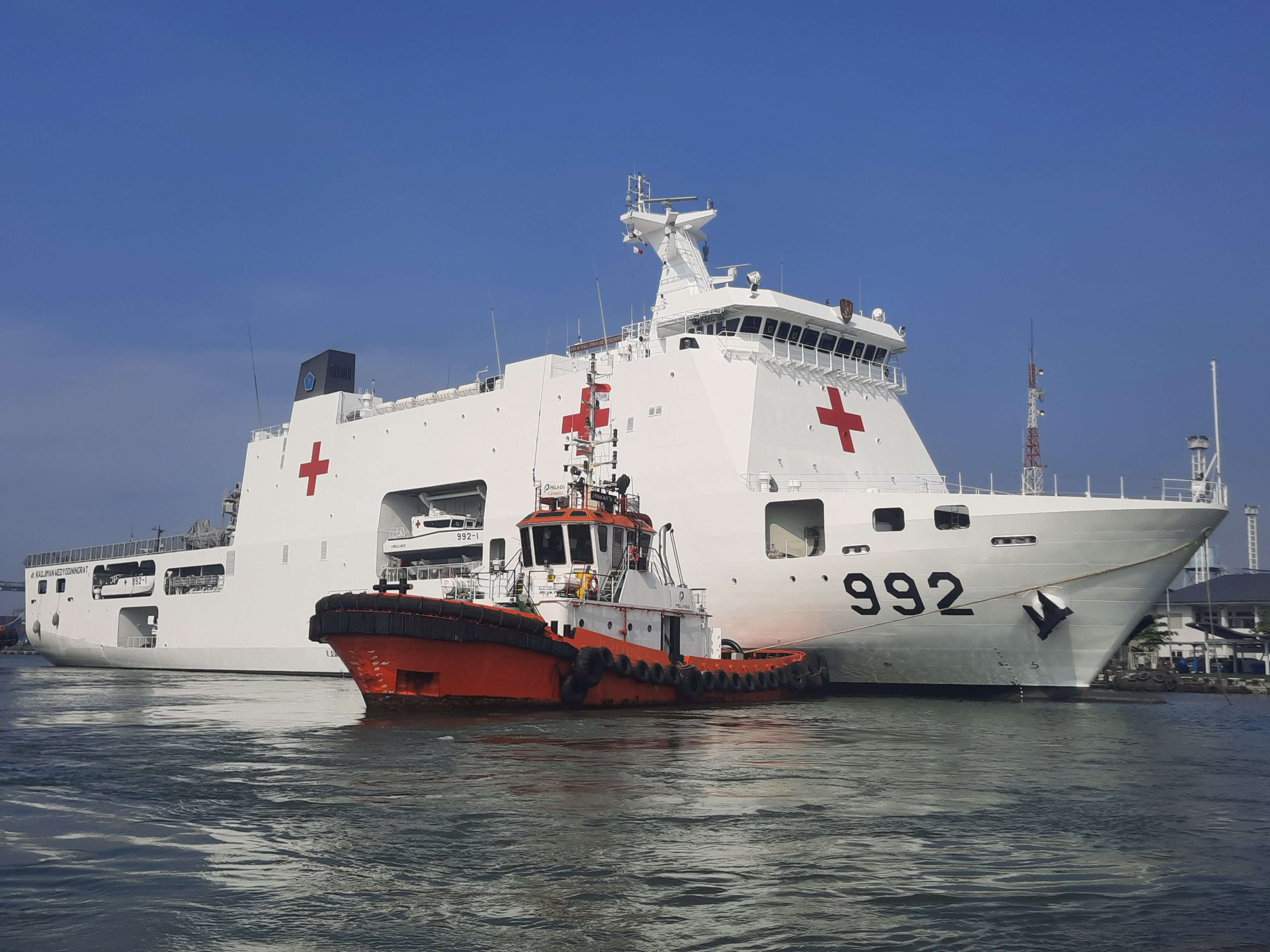
- KRI dr. Radjiman Wedyodiningrat (992) docked at the Military Sealift Command (Kolinlamil) Pier, Tanjung Priok, Jakarta, Thursday, 30 November 2023.

Indonesia
- Name: dr. Radjiman Wedyodiningrat
- Namesake: Rajiman Wediodiningrat
- Builder: PT PAL, Surabaya, Indonesia
- Laid down: 21 January 2021
- Launched: 15 August 2022
- Commissioned: 19 January 2023
- Identification: Pennant number: 992
- Motto: Sanskrit: Raharja Juwara Wahana
- Status: In active service
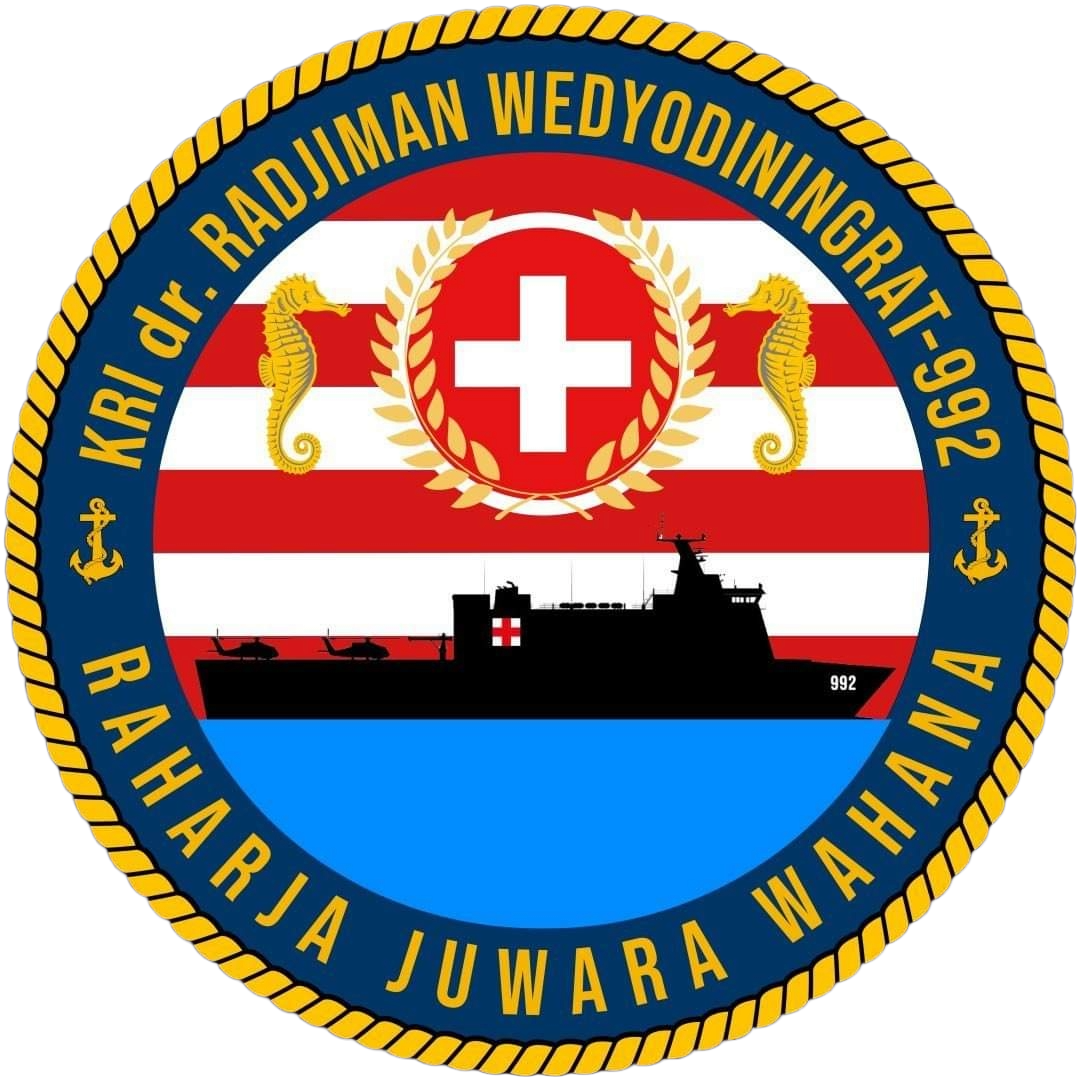
- Badge

General characteristics
- Class & type: Sudirohusodo-class hospital ship
- Displacement: 7,290 t (7,170 long tons)
- Length: 124 m (406 ft 10 in)
- Beam: 21.8 m (71 ft 6 in)
- Speed: 18 knots (33 km/h; 21 mph)
- Range: 10,000 nmi (19,000 km; 12,000 mi) at 12 knots (22 km/h; 14 mph)
- Endurance: 30 days
- Capacity: 643 people
- Sensors & processing systems: Terma SCANTER 6002
- Aviation facilities: Landing pad for 2x helicopter Helicopter hangar

KRI dr. Radjiman Wedyodiningrat (992) is the second ship of the Sudirohusodo-class hospital ships of the Indonesian Navy. The ship was named after Rajiman Wediodiningrat, an Indonesian national hero.

== Construction ==
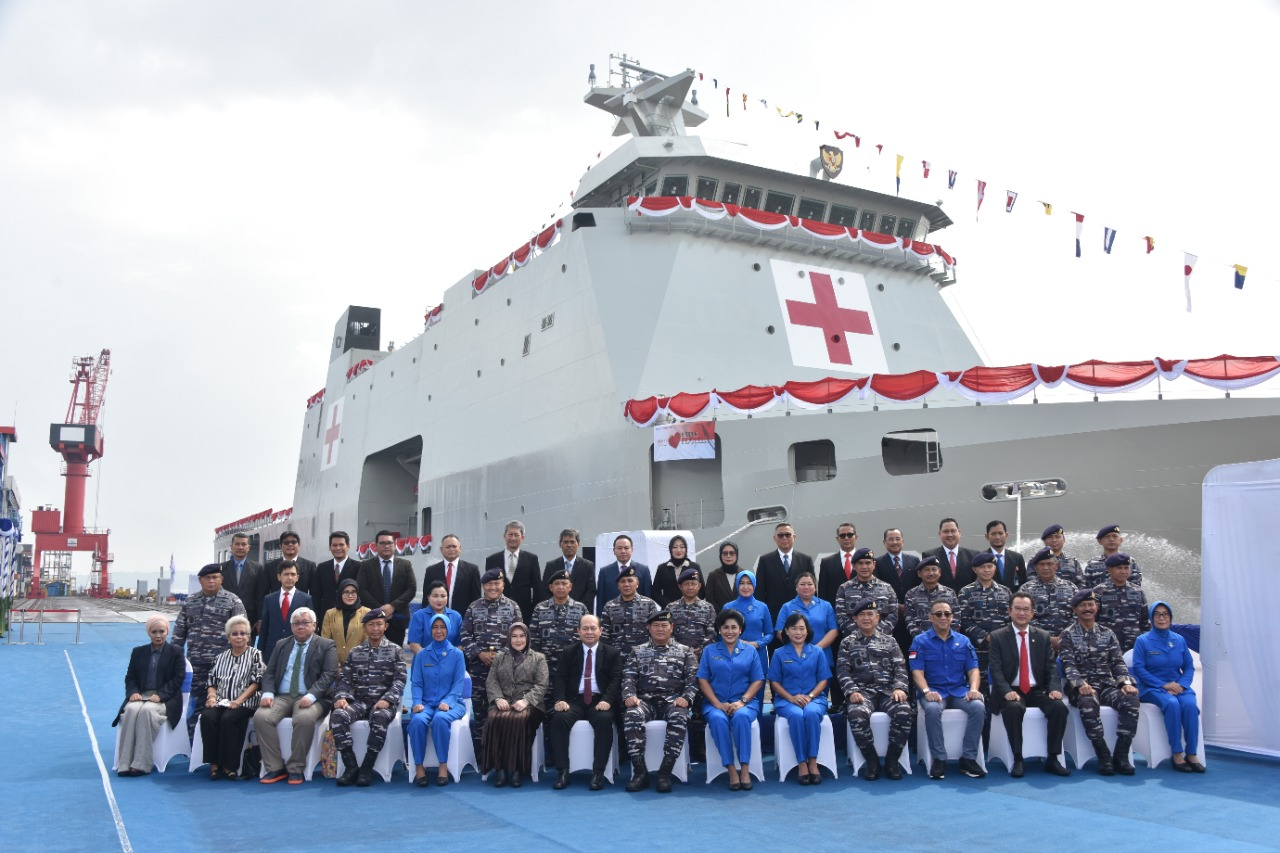
KRI dr. Radjiman Wedyodiningrat during its launching ceremony at PT PAL shipyard.

The construction of the ship started with the first steel cutting ceremony on 10 September 2020. Its keel was laid on 21 January 2021. KRI dr. Radjiman Wedyodiningrat was named and launched in a ceremony on 15 August 2022. The ceremony was attended by Chief of Staff of the Indonesian Navy Admiral Yudo Margono along with other Indonesian Navy officers, government and related companies officials, and relatives of Rajiman Wediodiningrat. On 16–19 December, the ship underwent sea acceptance tests in the Java Sea. dr. Radjiman Wedyodiningrat was commissioned on 19 January 2023 at Bandar Barat Pier, PAL Indonesia in Surabaya.

== Deployment ==
=== 2023–2024 Gazan War relief ===
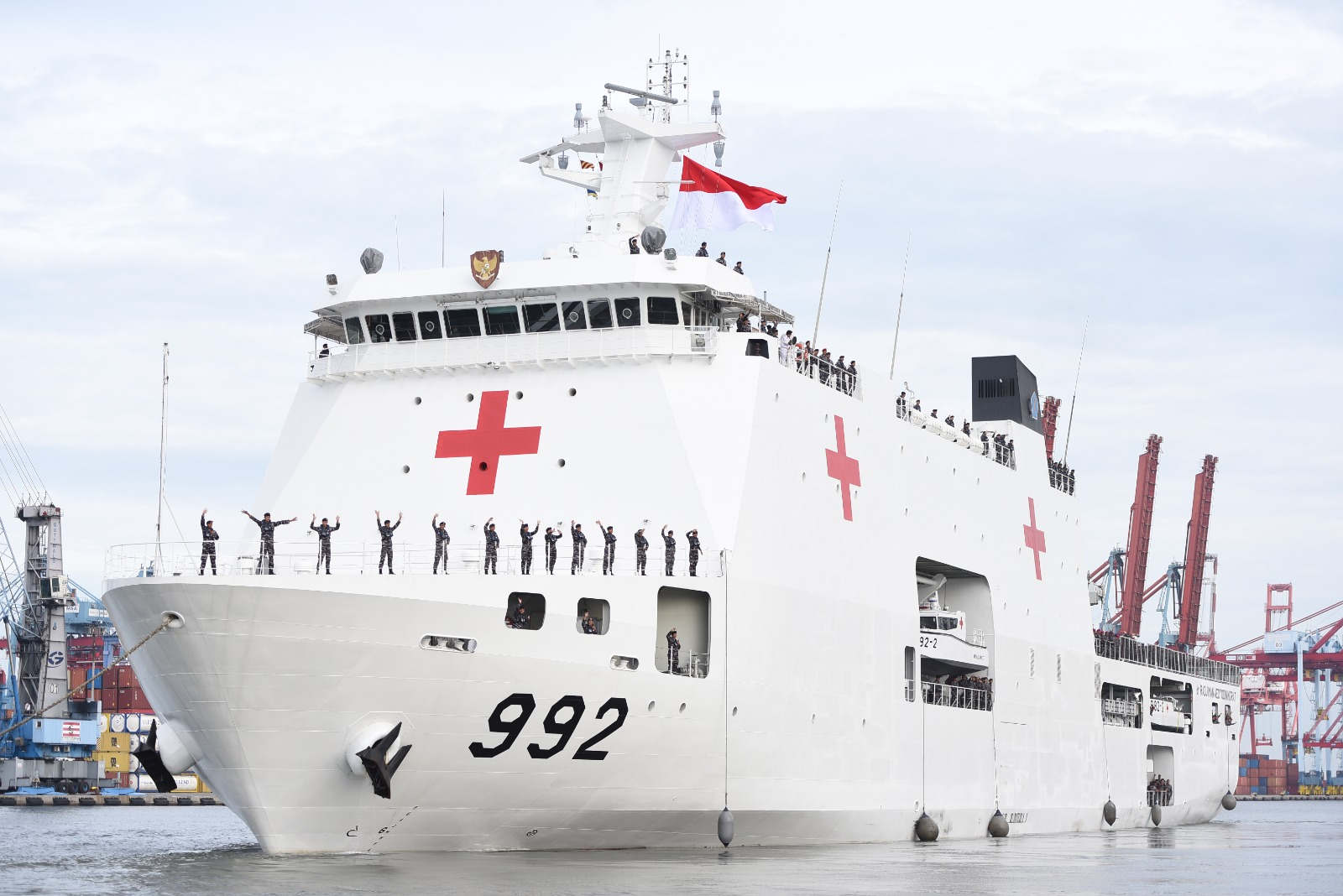
KRI dr. Radjiman Wedyodiningrat (992) departing from Military Sealift Command (Kolinlamil) Naval Base, Jakarta to El-Arish, Sinai, Egypt, 18 January 2024.

On 9 November 2023 the ship began preparations for a possible deployment to aid Palestinians during the Israeli invasion of the Gaza Strip.

On 21 November 2023 the Chief of Staff of the Indonesian Navy, Admiral Muhammad Ali, told journalists that the dr. Radjiman Wedyodiningrat is in the process of being repainted white. The white coloring is in accordance with the IV Geneva Convention and The San Remo Manual on International Law Applicable to Armed Conflicts at Sea. The repainting was carried out by PAL at the Irian Graving Dock, PT PAL, Surabaya, East Java, and the ship lowering or undocking process was carried out on 24 November.

After repainting, on 27 November the Indonesian Navy began the loading of humanitarian aid into this ship at the Indonesian 2nd Fleet Command (Koarmada II) dock, Surabaya, East Java. This assistance was collected both from government assistance, as well as the result of collaboration between various parties including businesspeople, humanitarian institutions, volunteer organizations and civil society to further carry out humanitarian missions to areas near Palestine.

On 30 November 2023, this ship arrived at the Military Sealift Command (Kolinlamil) Pier, Tanjung Priok, Jakarta, after sailing from Surabaya. Colonel Bayu from the Indonesian Navy said that this ship is ready to sail across the ocean to Palestinian waters, but the departure of this hospital aid ship is still waiting for government instructions. Because Indonesian Foreign Minister Retno Marsudi is still lobbying with the Egyptian government as a country that borders Israel.

On 18 January 2024, the ship was deployed form Jakarta, Indonesia to El-Arish, Sinai, Egypt; for Gazan war relief in the Gaza war between Hamas and Israel in the Gaza Strip. She arrived at El-Arish port, Egypt on 13 February 2024.

After delivering relief supplies, on 22 February 2024, KRI dr. Radjiman Wedyodiningrat (992) carry out Port Visit at Jeddah, Saudi Arabia, before departing from Saudi Arabia return to Indonesia on 25 February 2024.

In June 2024, the Indonesian Navy again prepared to deploy the ship for Gazan relief, along with another Indonesian hospital ship, the KRI dr. Wahidin Sudirohusodo (991).

=== 2025 Operational history ===
On 16 February 2025, KRI dr. Radjiman Wedyodiningrat (992) participated with partner nations in the Multilateral Naval Exercise KOMODO (MNEK) 2025 at Tanjung Benoa Waters, Bali.

On 11 July 2025, KRI dr. Radjiman Wedyoningrat (992) evacuates and treats victims of sinking ship KM Maju Jaya, in the northern waters of Bangka Island. The KM Maju Jaya capsized in a storm on the morning of 10 July, and the entire crew was adrift at sea for 30 hours until rescued by TB Danny 132, who then contacted KRI RJW-992 for medical evacuation.

== Gallery ==
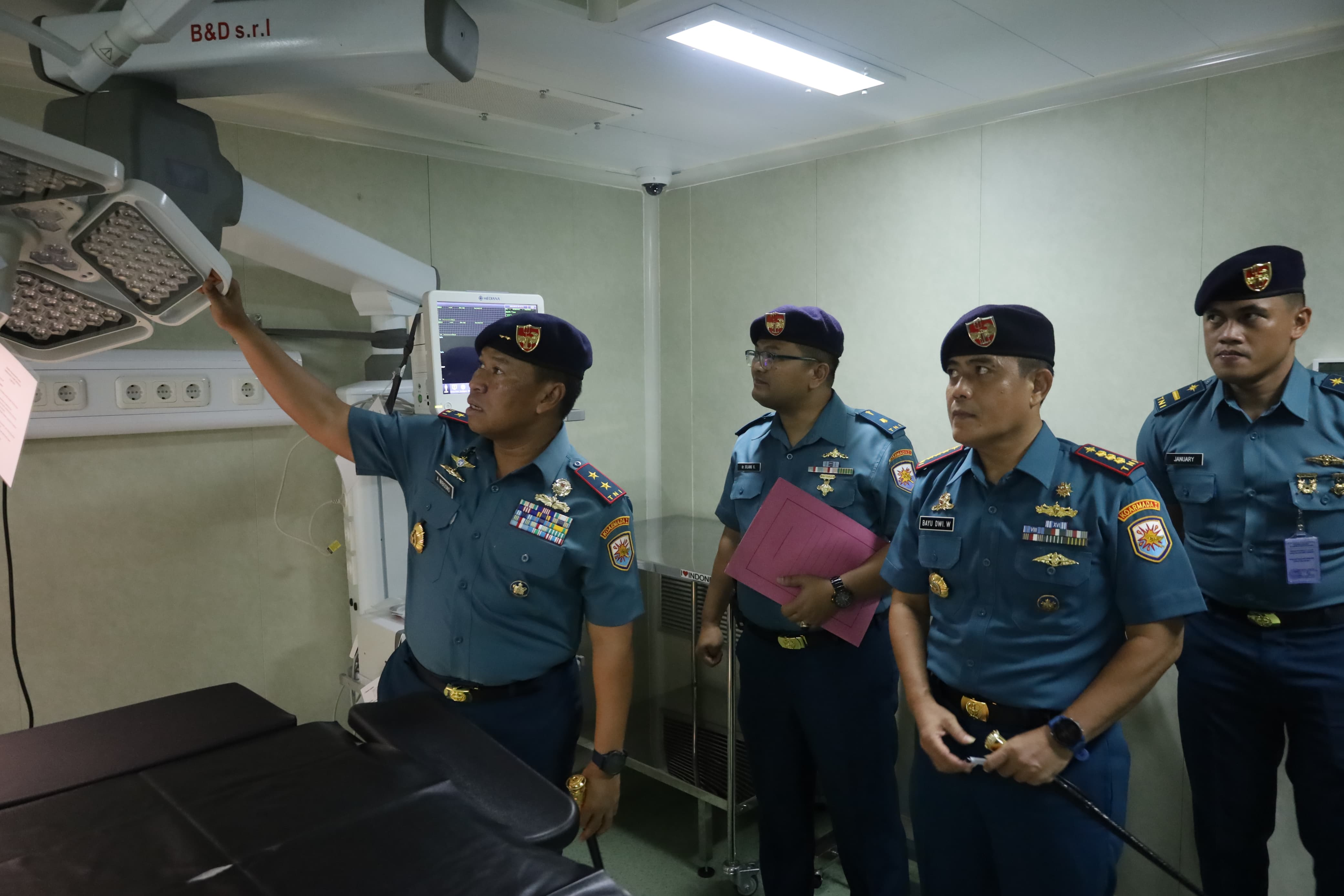
Indonesian Navy Commander of 1st Fleet Command carry out inspection aboard KRI dr. Radjiman Wedyodiningrat (992), 16 January 2024.

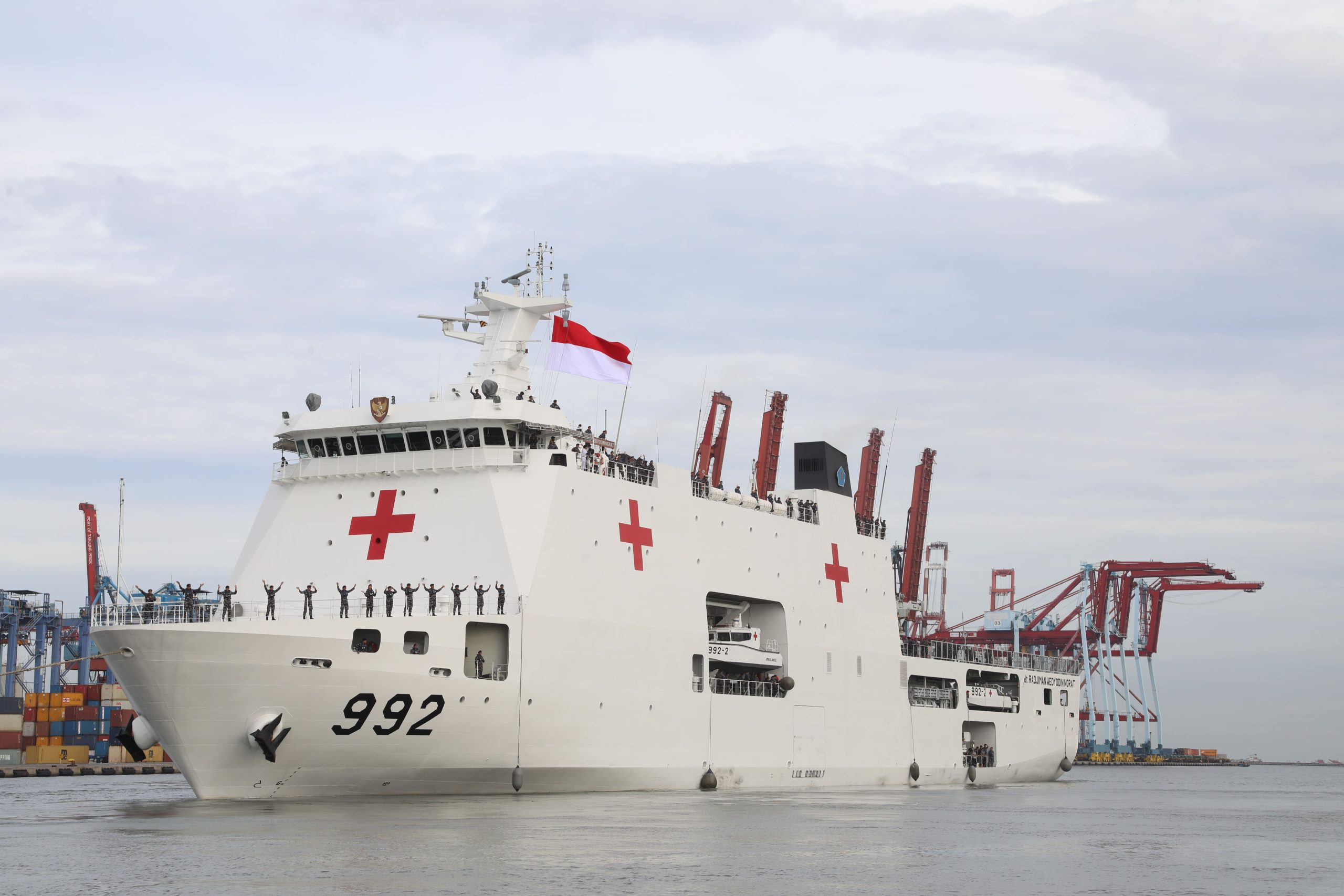
KRI dr. Radjiman Wedyodiningrat (992) departing from Indonesian Navy Military Sealift Command (Kolinlamil) Naval Base, Jakarta to El-Arish, Sinai, Egypt, 18 January 2024.

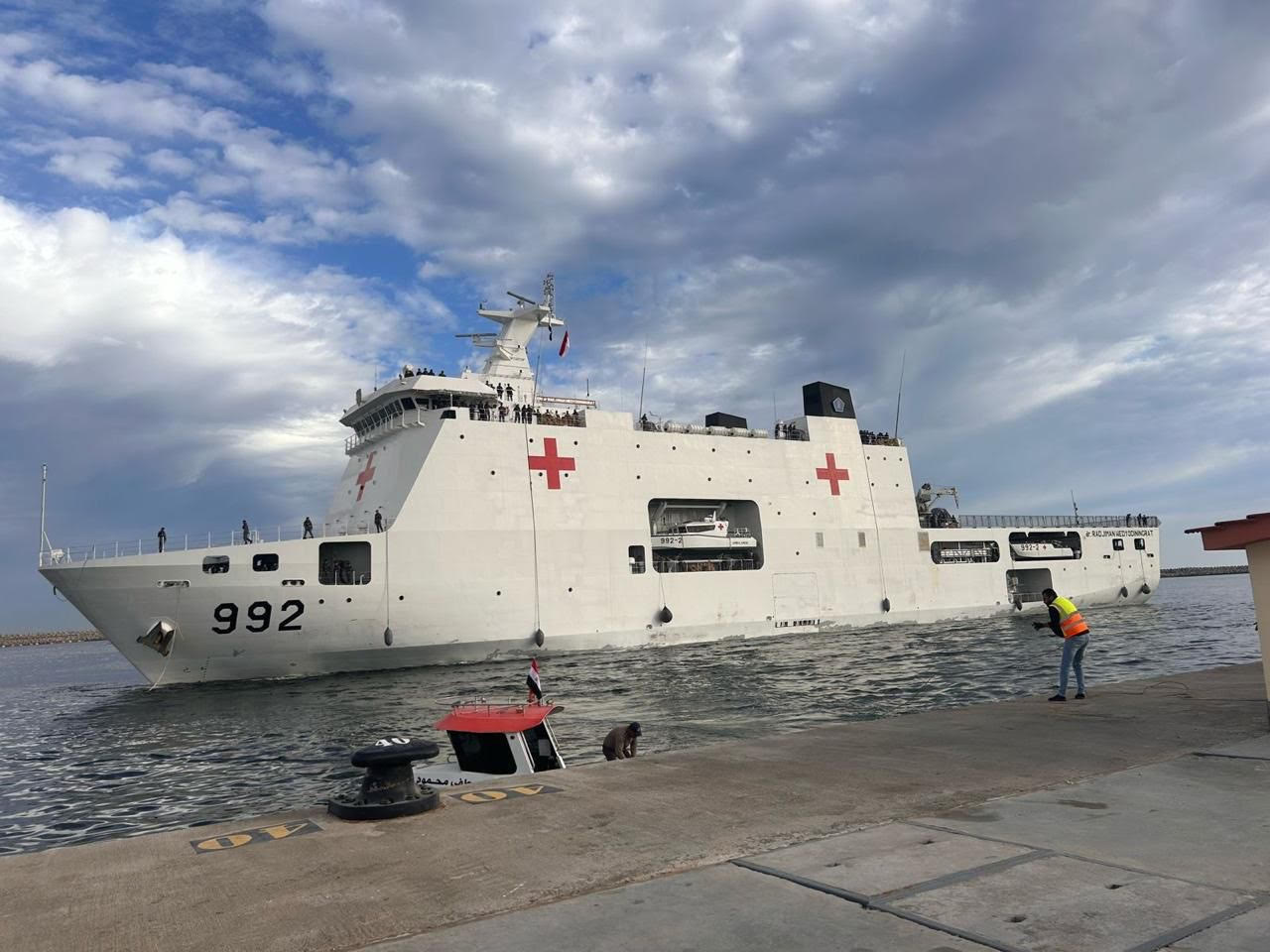
KRI dr. Radjiman Wedyodiningrat (992) arrived at El-Arish Port, Egypt, 13 February 2024.

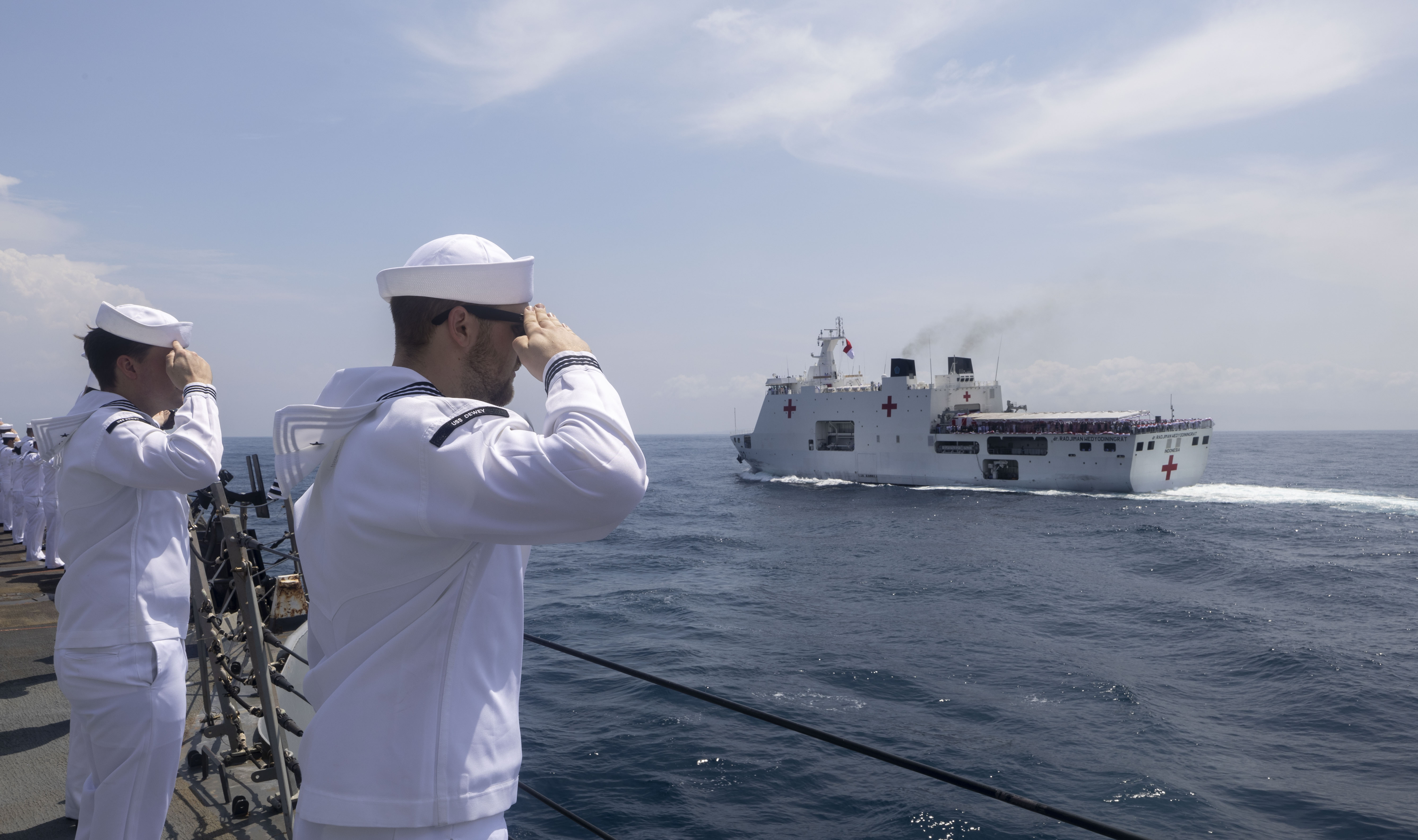
KRI dr. Radjiman Wedyodiningrat (992) participates in Multinational Exercise Komodo (MNEK) 2025.

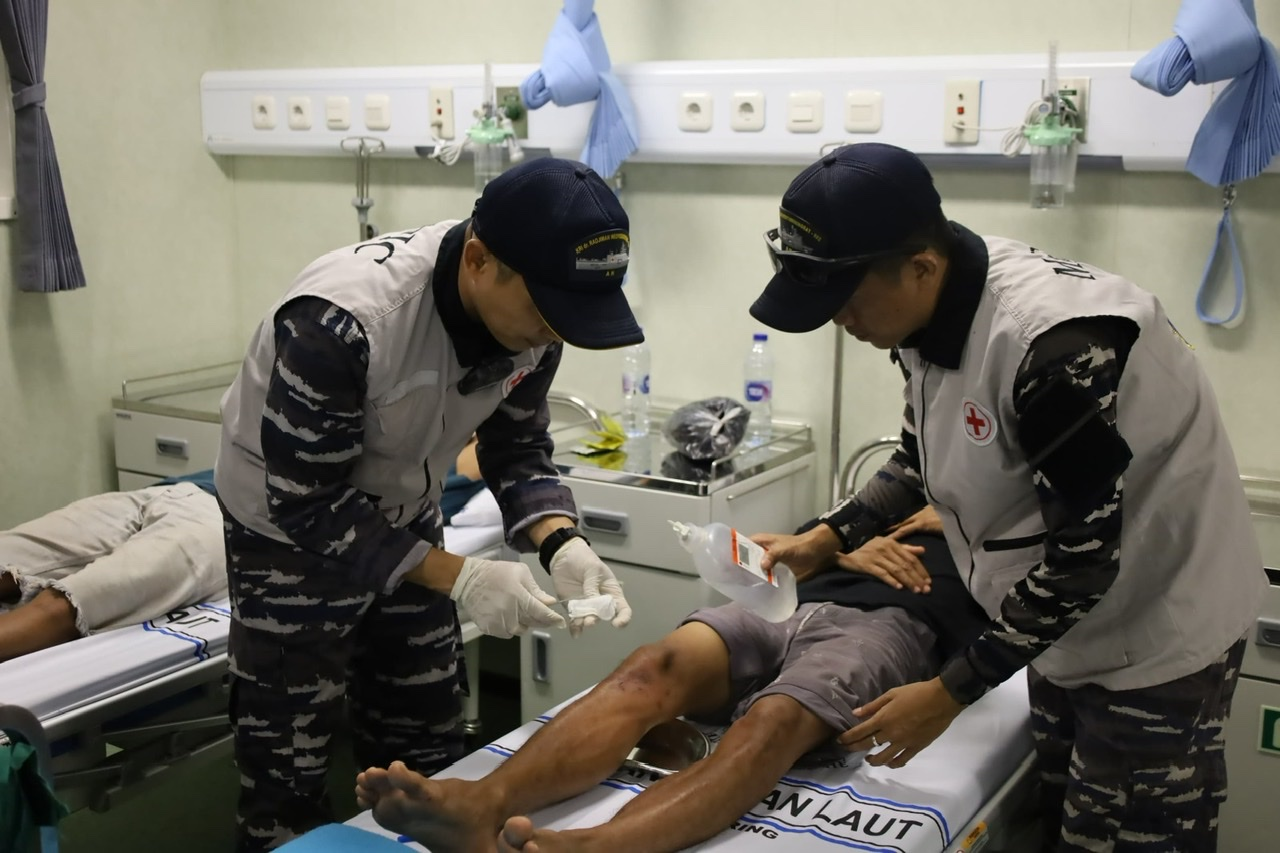
KRI dr. Radjiman Wedyoningrat (992) medical personnel evacuate and treat victims of sinking ship KM Maju Jaya, in the northern waters of Bangka Island, Friday, 11 July 2025.

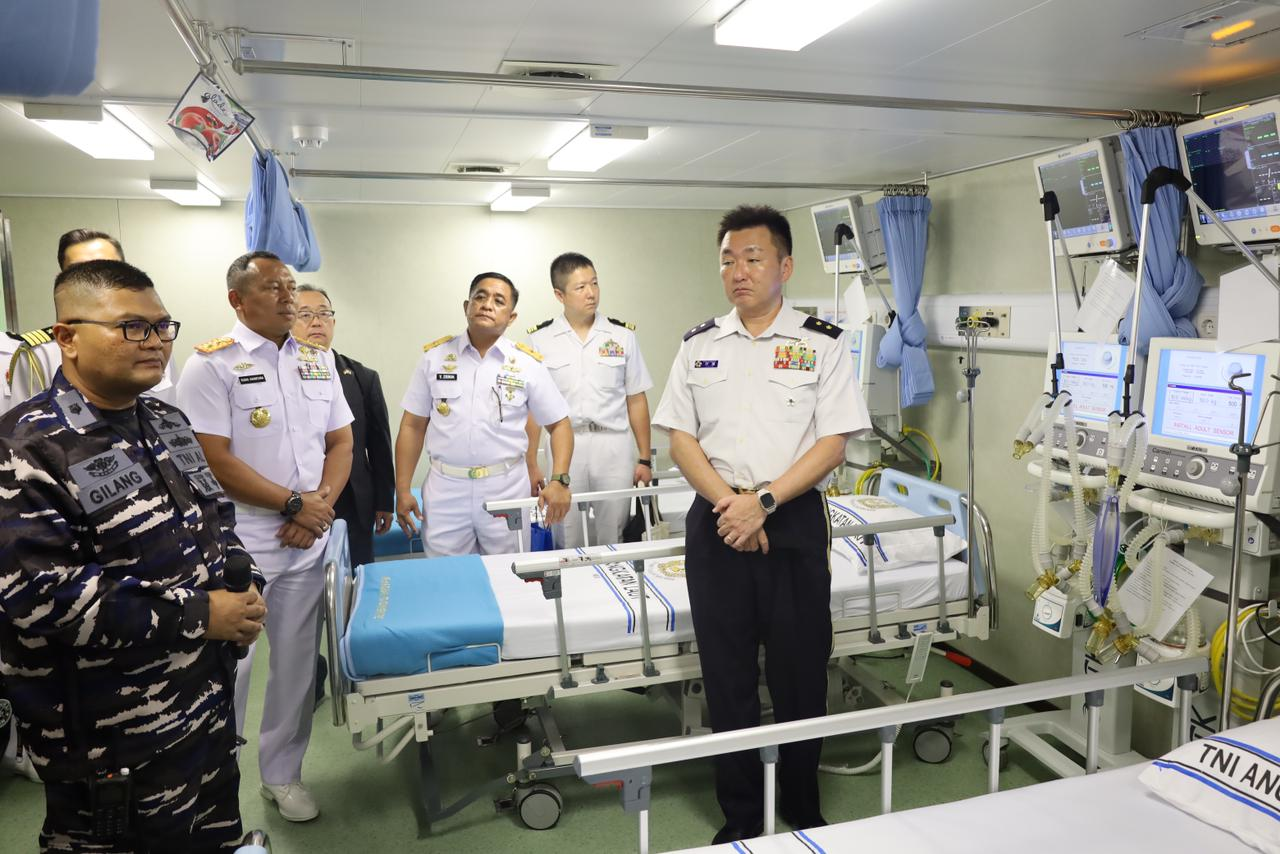
KRI dr. Radjiman Wedyodiningrat (992) received a visit from the Japanese Ministry of Defense delegation, 15 October 2025.
