= KRI dr. Wahidin Sudirohusodo =

Hospital ship

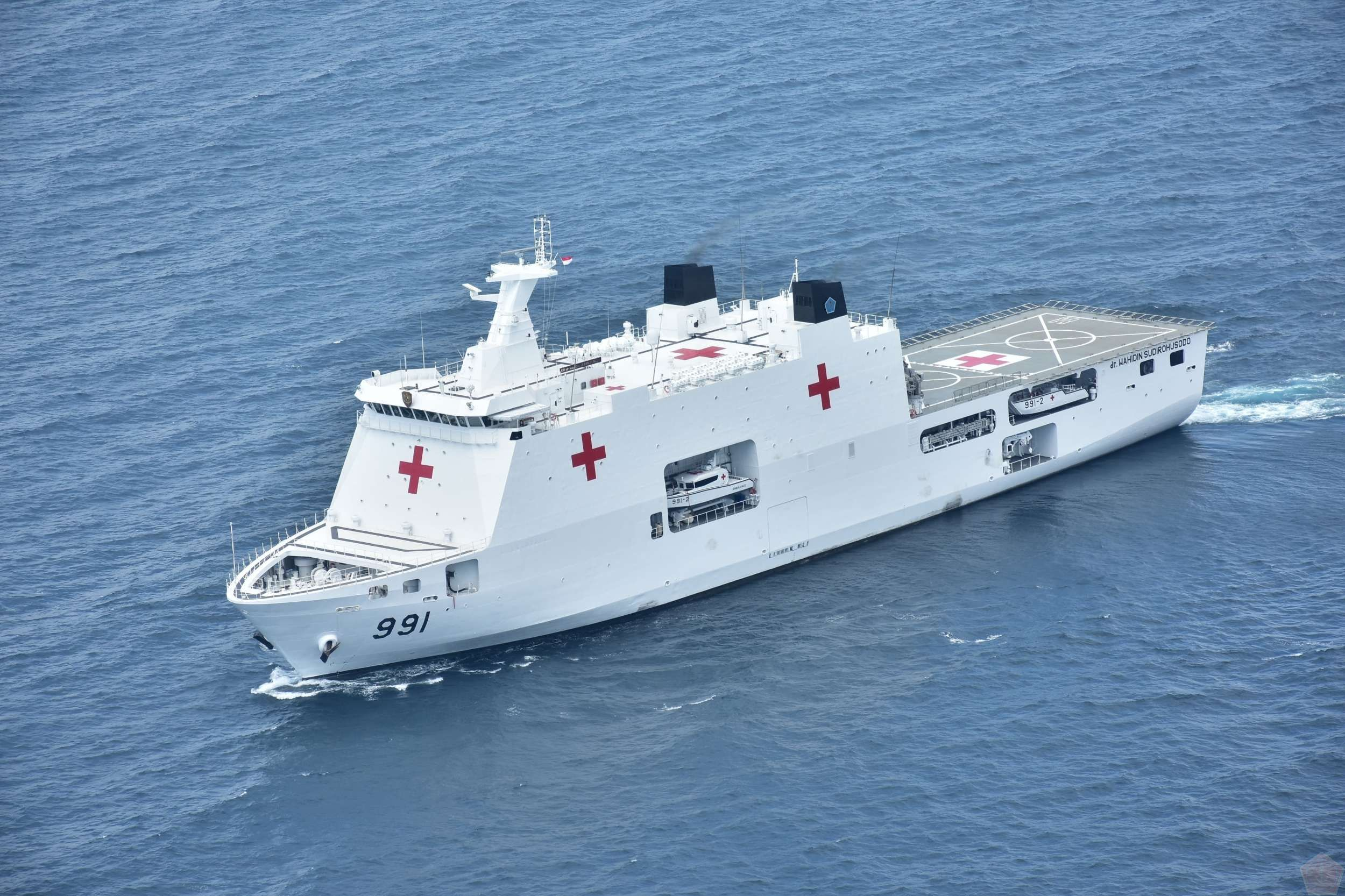
- KRI dr. Wahidin Sudirohusodo (991) conducted an Air Medical Evacuation exercise, near Madura Island, Thursday, 1 August 2024.

Indonesia
- Name: dr. Wahidin Sudirohusodo
- Namesake: Wahidin Soedirohoesodo
- Builder: PT PAL, Surabaya, Indonesia
- Cost: US$49 million per unit
- Yard number: W000302
- Laid down: 14 October 2019
- Launched: 7 January 2021
- Commissioned: 14 January 2022
- Identification: Pennant number: 991
- Motto: Sanskrit: Widyanata Sahasya Hanvit
- Status: In active service
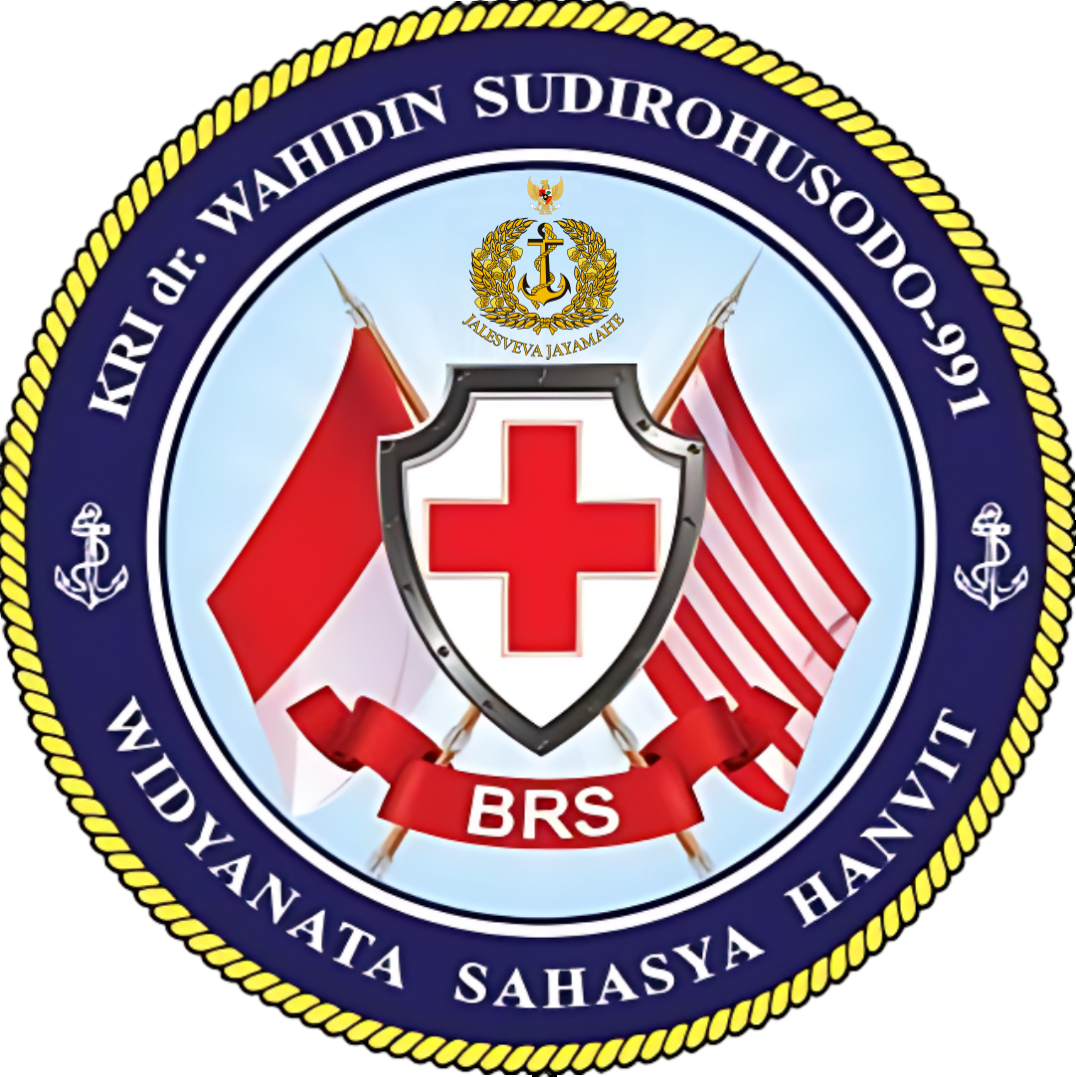
- Badge

General characteristics
- Class & type: Sudirohusodo-class Hospital ship
- Displacement: 7,290 t (7,170 long tons)
- Length: 124 m (406 ft 10 in)
- Beam: 21.8 m (71 ft 6 in)
- Speed: 18 knots (33 km/h; 21 mph)
- Range: 10,000 nmi (19,000 km; 12,000 mi) at 12 knots (22 km/h; 14 mph)
- Endurance: 30 days
- Capacity: 643 people
- Sensors & processing systems: Terma SCANTER 6002
- Aviation facilities: Landing pad for 2x helicopter Helicopter hangar

KRI dr. Wahidin Sudirohusodo (991) is the lead ship of the Sudirohusodo-class hospital ship of the Indonesian Navy. It is named after Wahidin Soedirohoesodo, an Indonesian national hero. It was built in Indonesia by PT PAL.

== Description ==
It has a length of 124 meters and a beam of 21.8 meter. The ship displacement is 7,290 tonnes. It has a capacity of 643 people, including 159 patients. It has a maximum speed of 18 knots, a cruising speed of 14 knots, and an economical speed of 12 knots. It can sail up to 30 days and 10,000 nautical miles.

== Construction ==
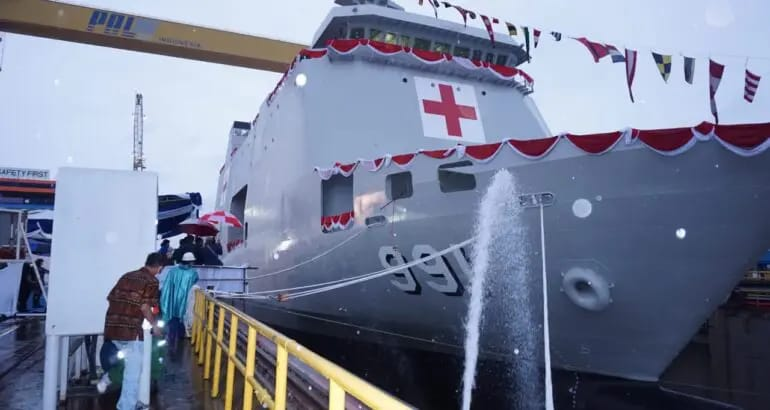
KRI dr. Wahidin Sudirohusodo during launching on 7 January 2021.

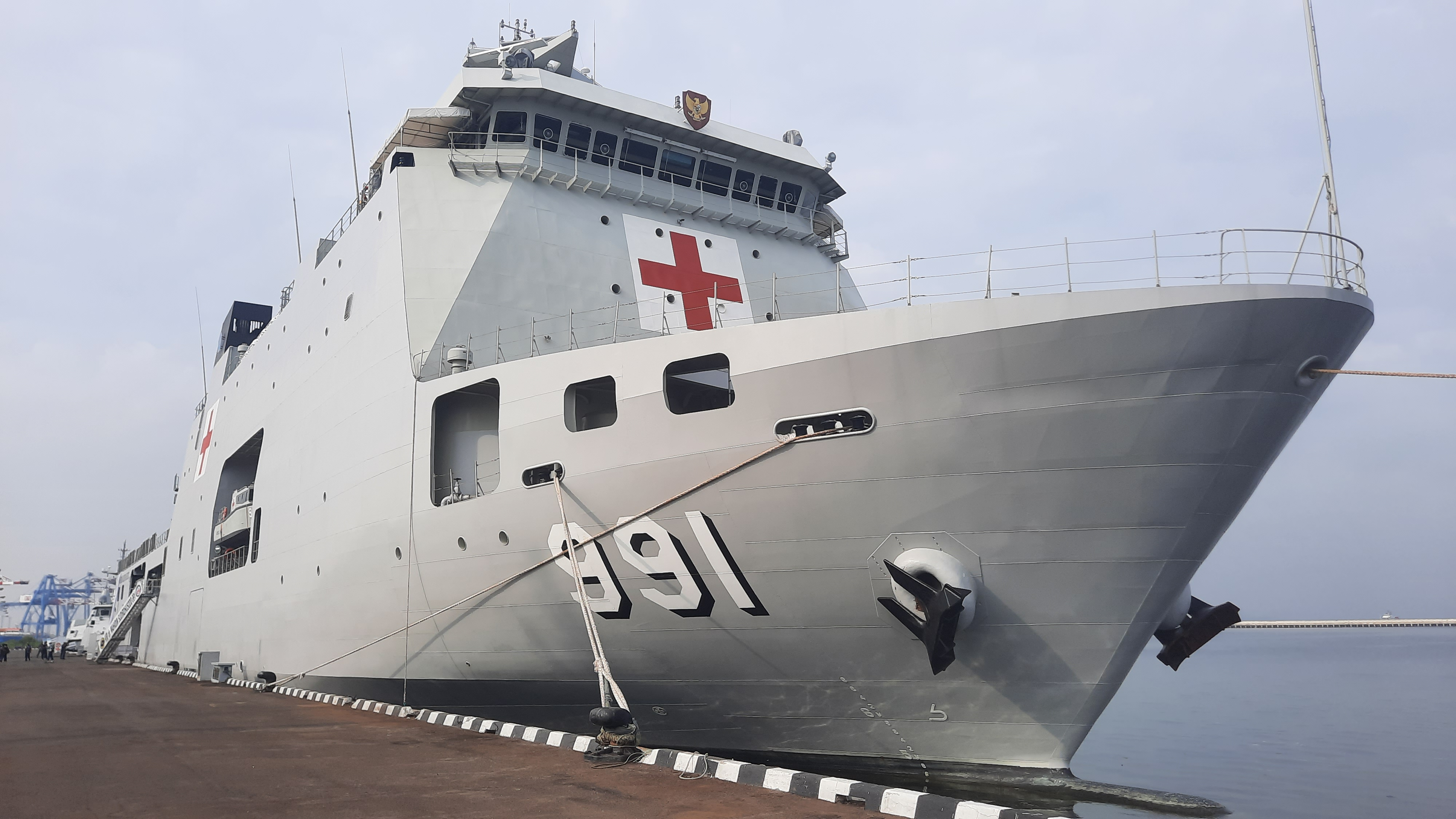
KRI dr. Wahidin Sudirohusodo (991) during the ship-naming ceremony on 3 November 2022.

The construction of the ship began with the first steel cutting ceremony on 9 July 2019, with the ship assigned with yard number of W000302. Its keel was laid on 14 October 2019. KRI dr. Wahidin Sudirohusodo was launched on 7 January 2021 at Semarang drydock in PT PAL shipyard, Surabaya. Along with KRI Golok (688), the ship was commissioned on 14 January 2022 at Surabaya, with its first commander being Sea Colonel Anton Pratomo.

On 3 November 2022, the ship naming ceremony for the KRI dr. Wahidin Sudirohusodo-991 was held by the Minister of Defense of the Republic of Indonesia, Prabowo Subianto, accompanied by the Chief of Staff of the Indonesian Navy Admiral Muhammad Ali at Pondok Dayung Pier, North Jakarta.

== Deployment ==
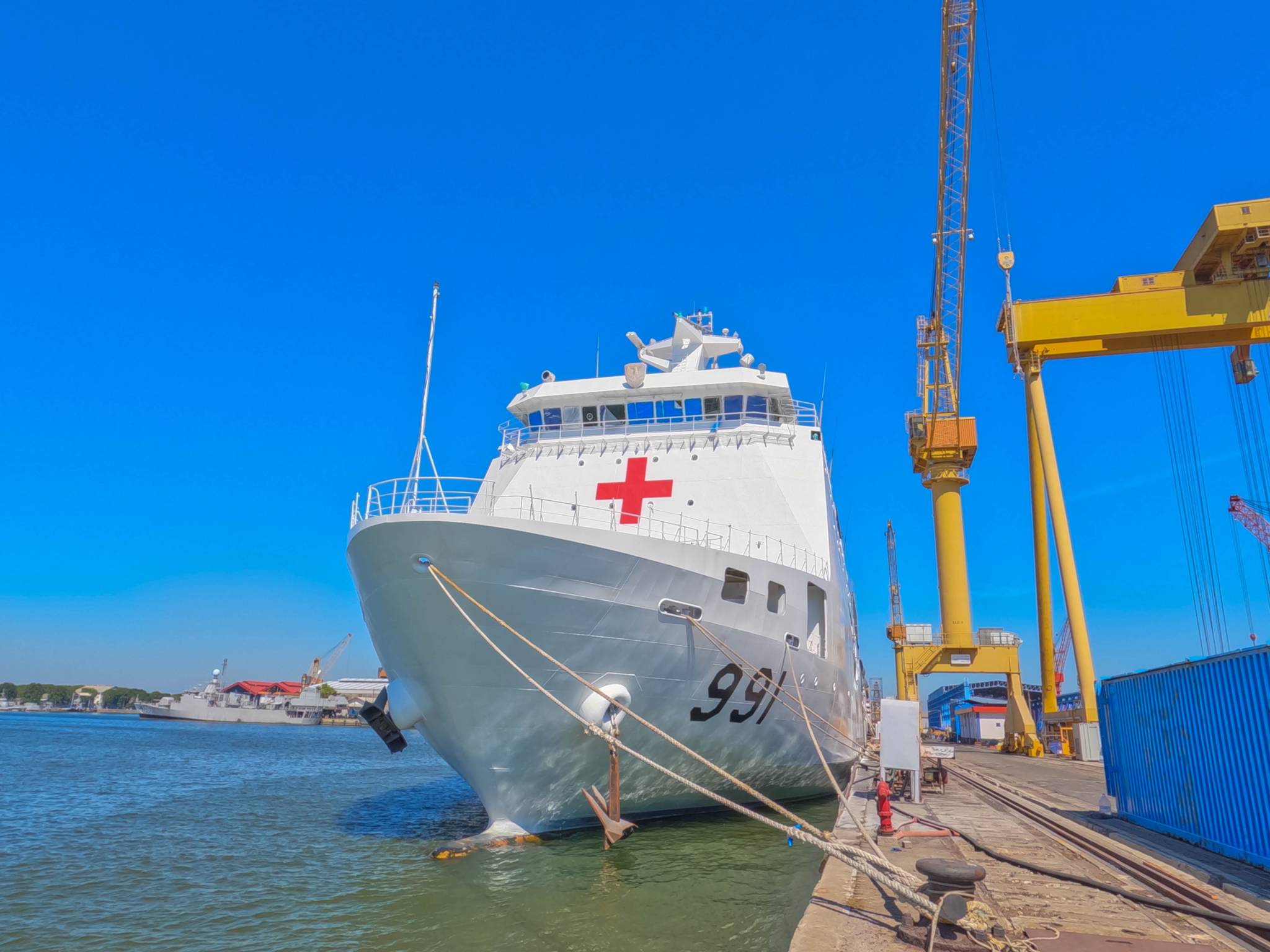
KRI dr. Wahidin Sudirohusodo (991) after being repainted white at PT PAL Indonesia, Surabaya, 15 July 2024.

In June 2024, the ship was repainted white in accordance with the IV Geneva Convention and The San Remo Manual on International Law Applicable to Armed Conflicts at Sea, and in anticipation of being deployed for Gazan War relief in the Gaza war between Hamas and Israel. It was to be deployed to Arish, Sinai, Egypt; next to the Gaza Strip, along with another Indonesian hospital ship, KRI dr. Radjiman Wedyodiningrat (992).

In October to November 2024, the ship in the 2024 Port Visit Task Force carried out South Pacific Goodwill mission, visited Fiji, Solomon Islands, Vanuatu, and Papua New Guinea to provide healthcare for 48 days before returning to Indonesia.

On 16 February 2025, she participated with partner nations in the Multilateral Naval Exercise KOMODO (MNEK) 2025 at Tanjung Benoa Waters, Bali.

In September 2025, KRI dr. Wahidin Sudirohusodo (991) and KRI Raden Eddy Martadinata (331) in the 2025 Port Visit Task Force, carried out diplomatic and humanitarian mission to Papua New Guinea to strengthen bilateral ties. The ships arrived at T-Wharf, Port Moresby, Papua New Guinea on 14 September 2025. After completed the diplomatic and humanitarian mission, KRI dr. Wahidin Sudirohusodo and KRI Raden Eddy Martadinata returned to Indonesia on 18 September 2025, arrived at Sorong, Indonesia on 26 September 2025.

== Gallery ==
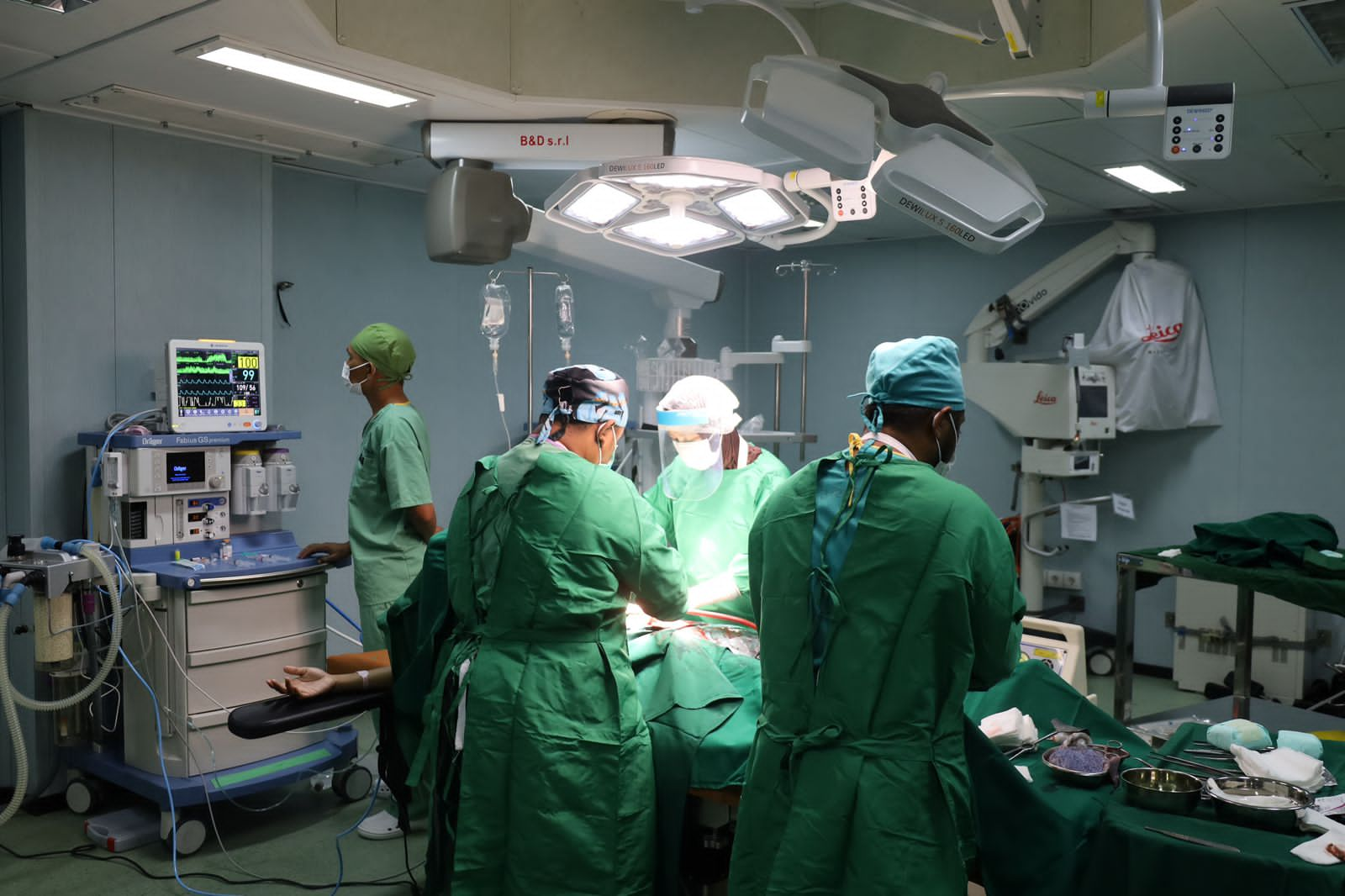
The medical team on the KRI dr. Wahidin Sudirohusodo (991) carry out medical procedures on a patient, 24 November 2022.

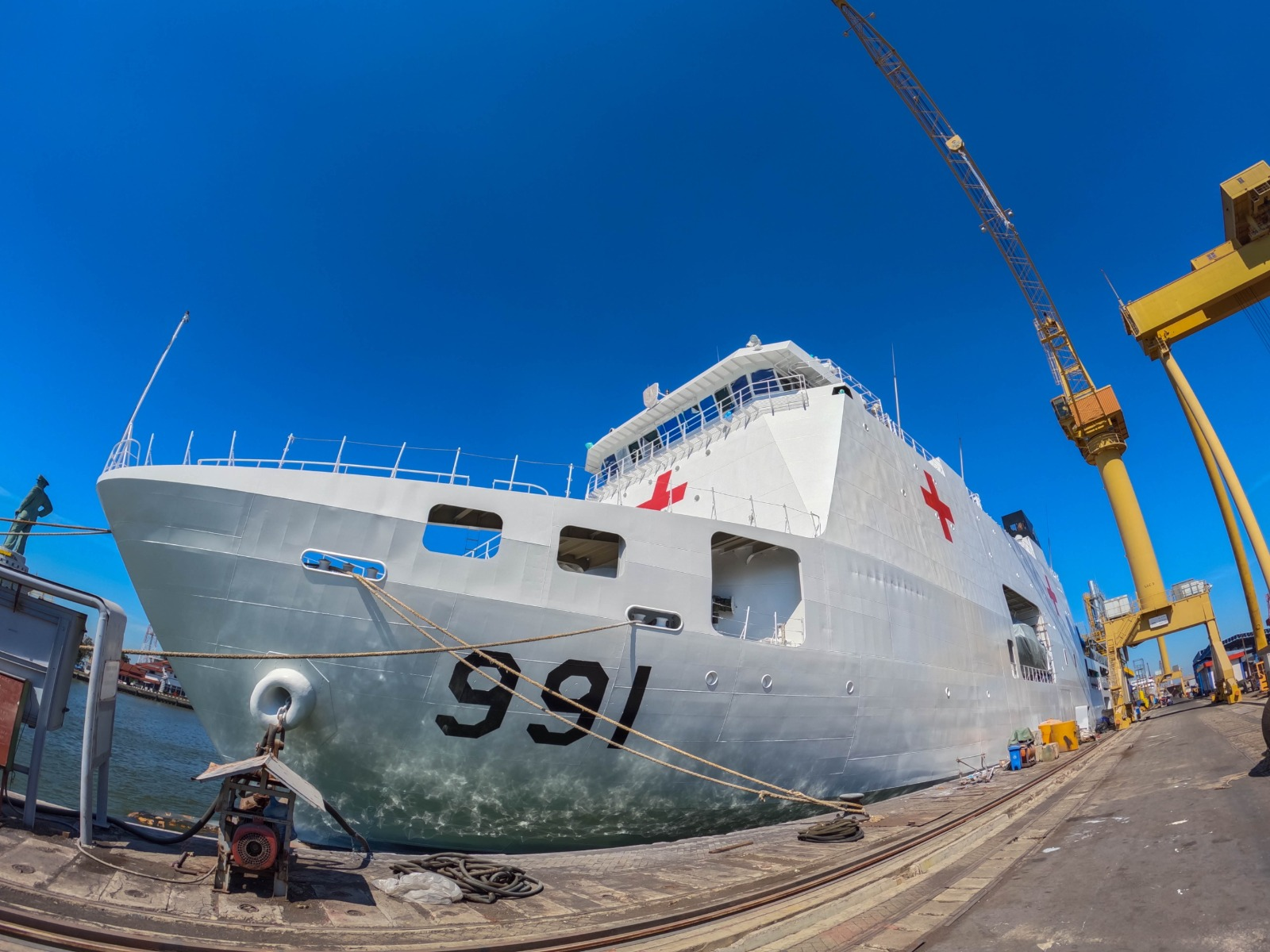
KRI dr. Wahidin Sudirohusodo (991) after being repainted white at PT PAL, Surabaya, Indonesia, 15 July 2024.

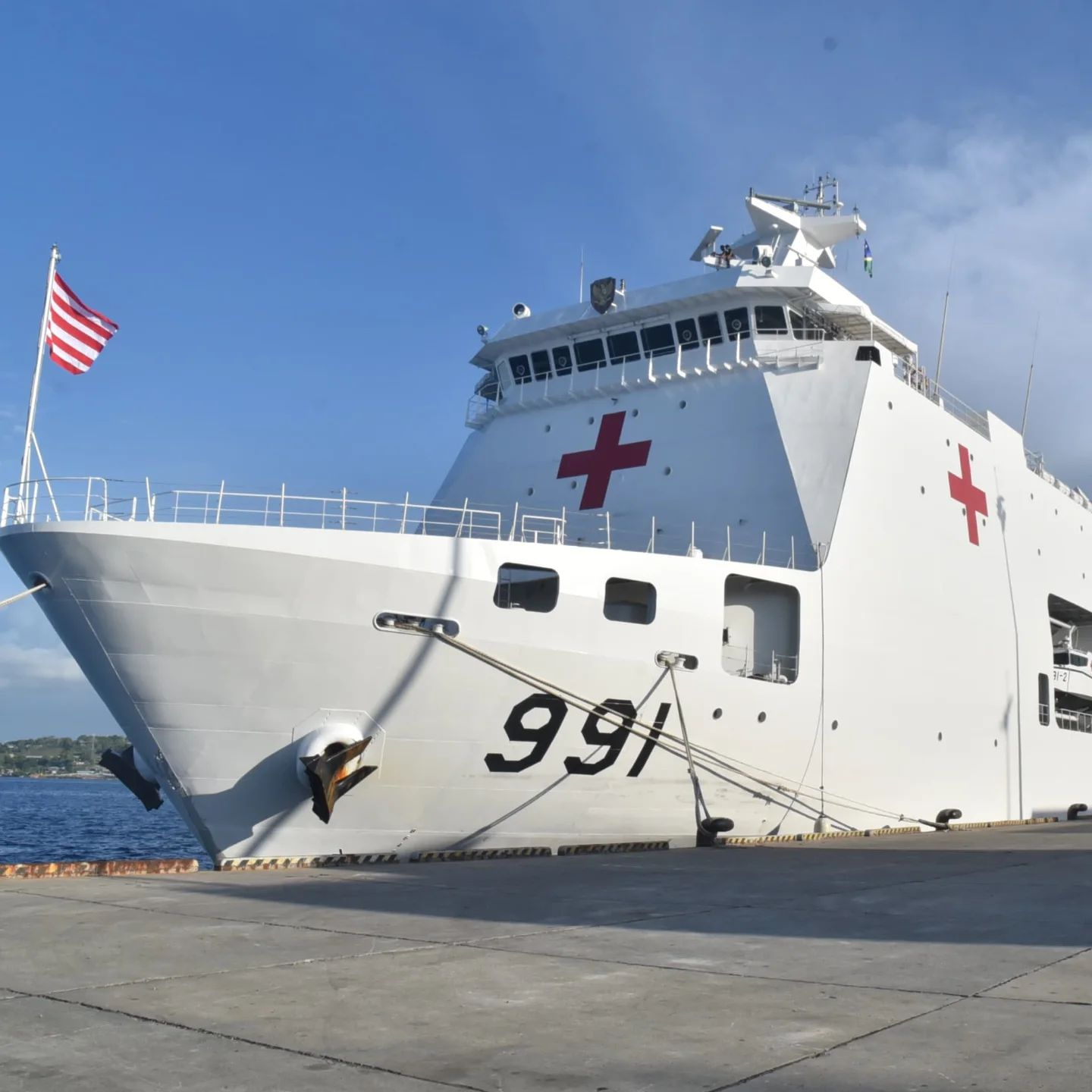
KRI dr. Wahidin Sudirohusodo (991) docked at Honiara Port, Solomon Islands to provide healthcare services for Solomon Islands citizens, 25 October 2024.

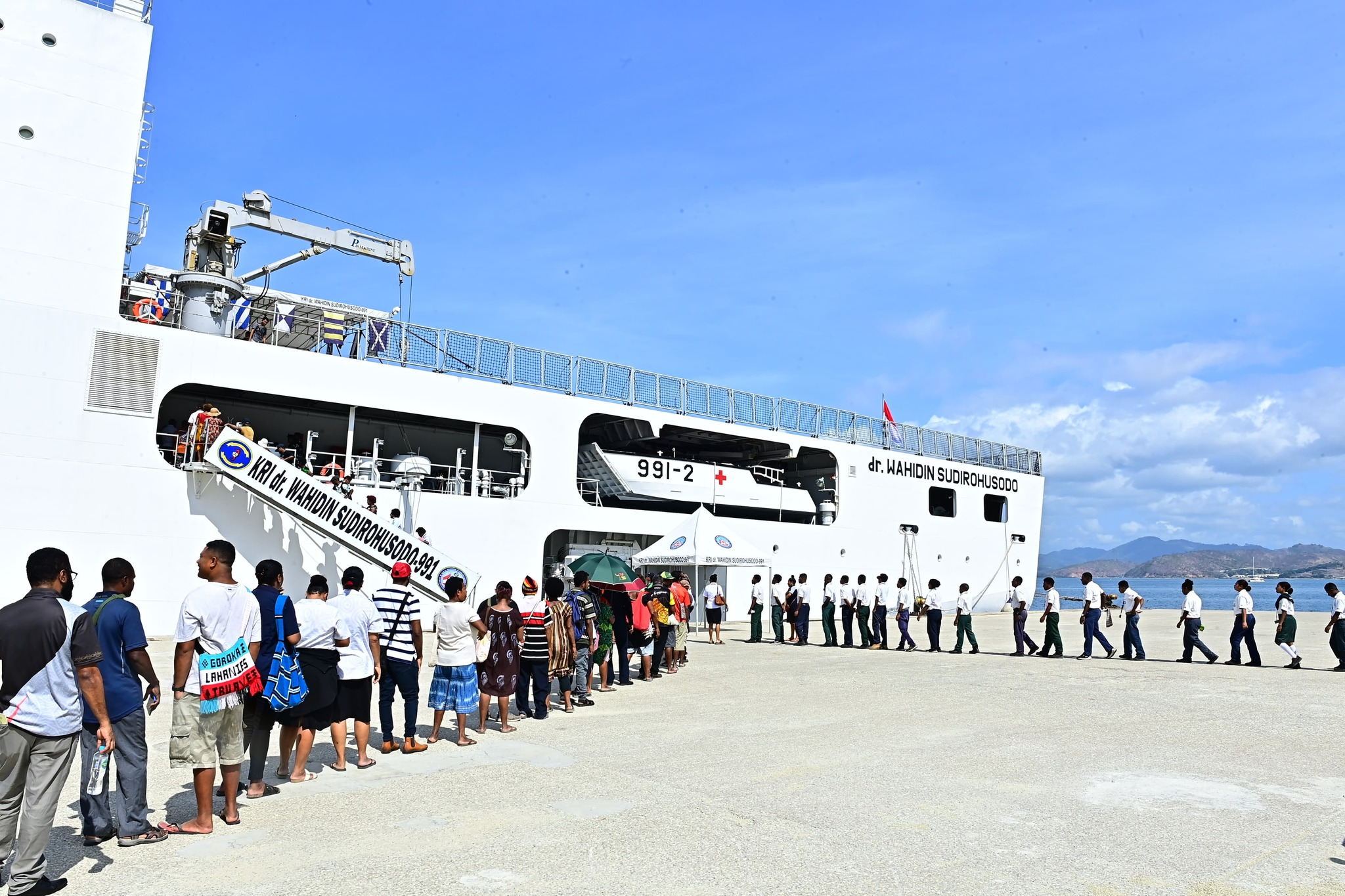
KRI dr. Wahidin Sudirohusodo docked at Port Moresby, Papua New Guinea to provide healthcare services for PNG citizens, 18 November 2024.

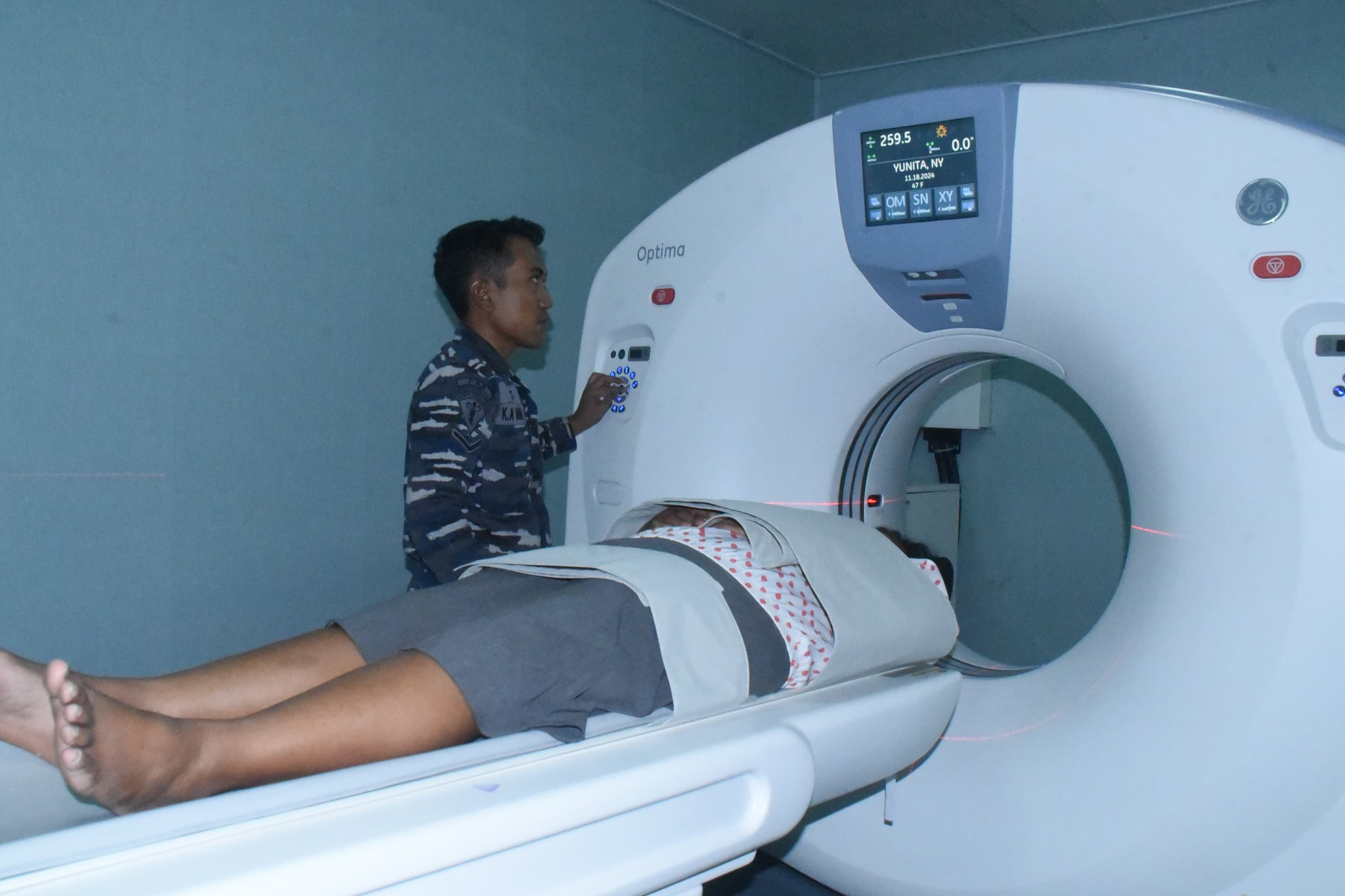
Port Visit Task Force health team providing the CT Scan services to a PNG citizen aboard KRI dr. Wahidin Sudirohusodo, 18 November 2024.
