= KRI Semarang =

Indonesian Navy hospital ship

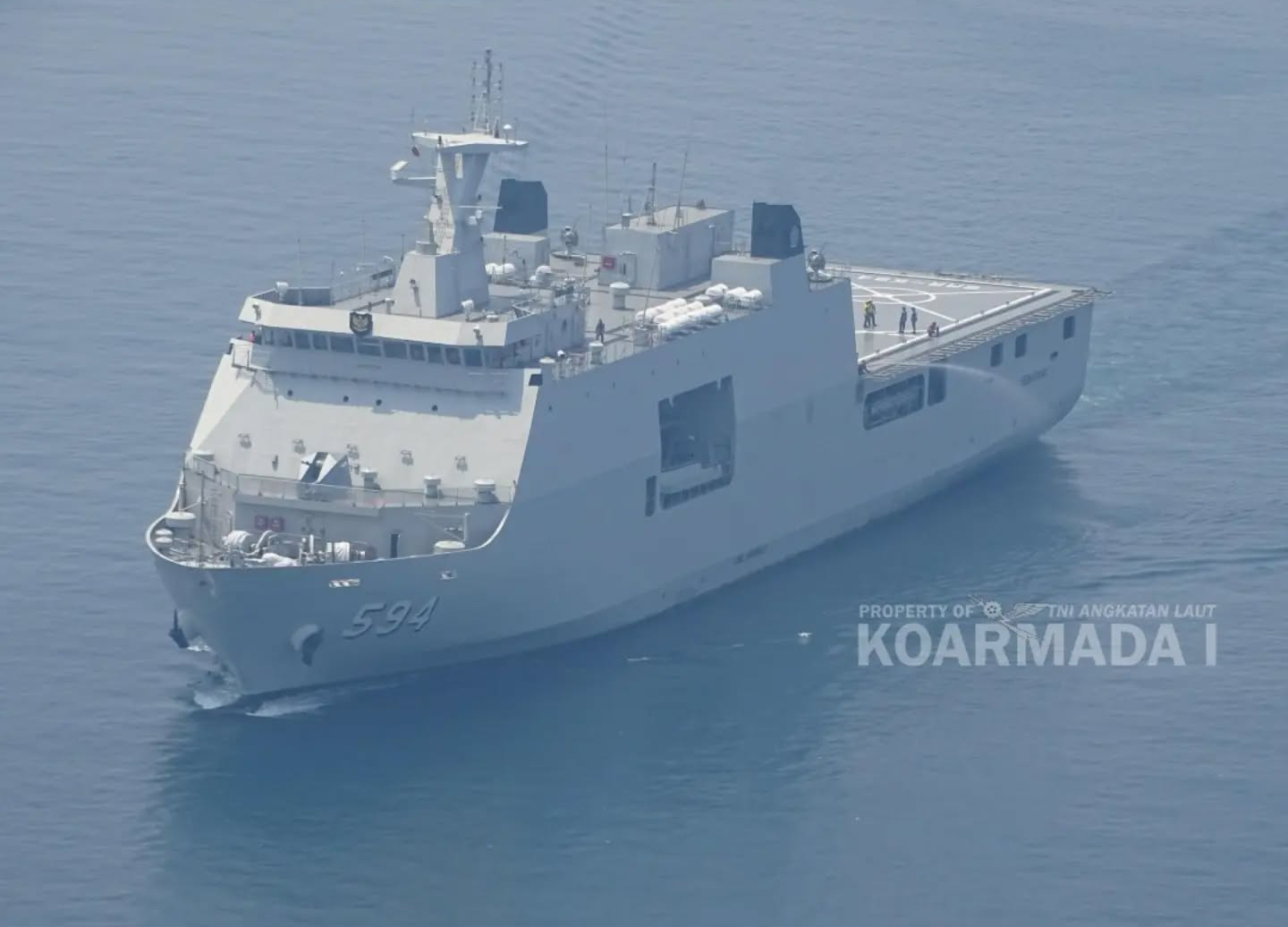
- KRI Semarang (594) at Jakarta Bay, 19 October 2024.

History

Indonesia
- Name: Semarang
- Namesake: Semarang
- Owner: Indonesian Navy
- Ordered: 11 January 2017
- Builder: PT PAL Indonesia
- Laid down: 28 August 2017
- Launched: 3 August 2018
- Commissioned: 21 January 2019
- Home port: Ujung Koarmada II, Surabaya
- Identification: IMO number: 4735598; MMSI number: 525114043; Callsign: YCIK2; Pennant number: 594
- Status: Active

General characteristics
- Class & type: Makassar-class landing platform dock
- Displacement: Standard: 7,200 tons; Full load: 11,583 tons
- Length: 123 m (403.5 ft)
- Beam: 21.8 m (71.5 ft)
- Draft: 5 m (16.4 ft)
- Installed power: 1 x MAN D2842 LE301 diesel generator
- Propulsion: Combined diesel and diesel (CODAD) arrangement: 2 × MAN-STX 8L27/38 diesel engines, each producing 3,915 bhp (2,920 kW)
- Speed: Cruising: 13 kn (24.1 km/h; 15 mph); Maximum: 16 kn (29.6 km/h; 18.4 mph)
- Range: 9360 nmi (17334.7 km)
- Endurance: 30 days
- Boats & landing craft carried: 2 × LCU or LCM at floodable well decks; 2 × RHIB or LCVP at boat davits
- Capacity: 500 troops plus associated vehicles and equipment
- Complement: 121 crew
- Armament: 1 x Leonardo OTO Twin 40L70 Compact (Stealth); 2 x 20mm Oerlikon; 2 x Mistral Simbad
- Aircraft carried: Up to 3 helicopters
- Aviation facilities: Hangar for 1 medium (10-ton) helicopter; Flight deck for 2 medium (10-ton) helicopters

KRI Semarang (594) is the fifth Makassar-class landing platform dock of the Indonesian Navy.

== Development ==
Indonesia signed a US$150 million contract in December 2004 and the first two Makassar-class were built in Busan, South Korea. The remaining two were built at Indonesia's PT PAL shipyard in Surabaya with assistance from Daesun. The contract for the third and fourth LPD to be built in Indonesia was signed with PT PAL on March 28, 2005.

== Construction and career ==
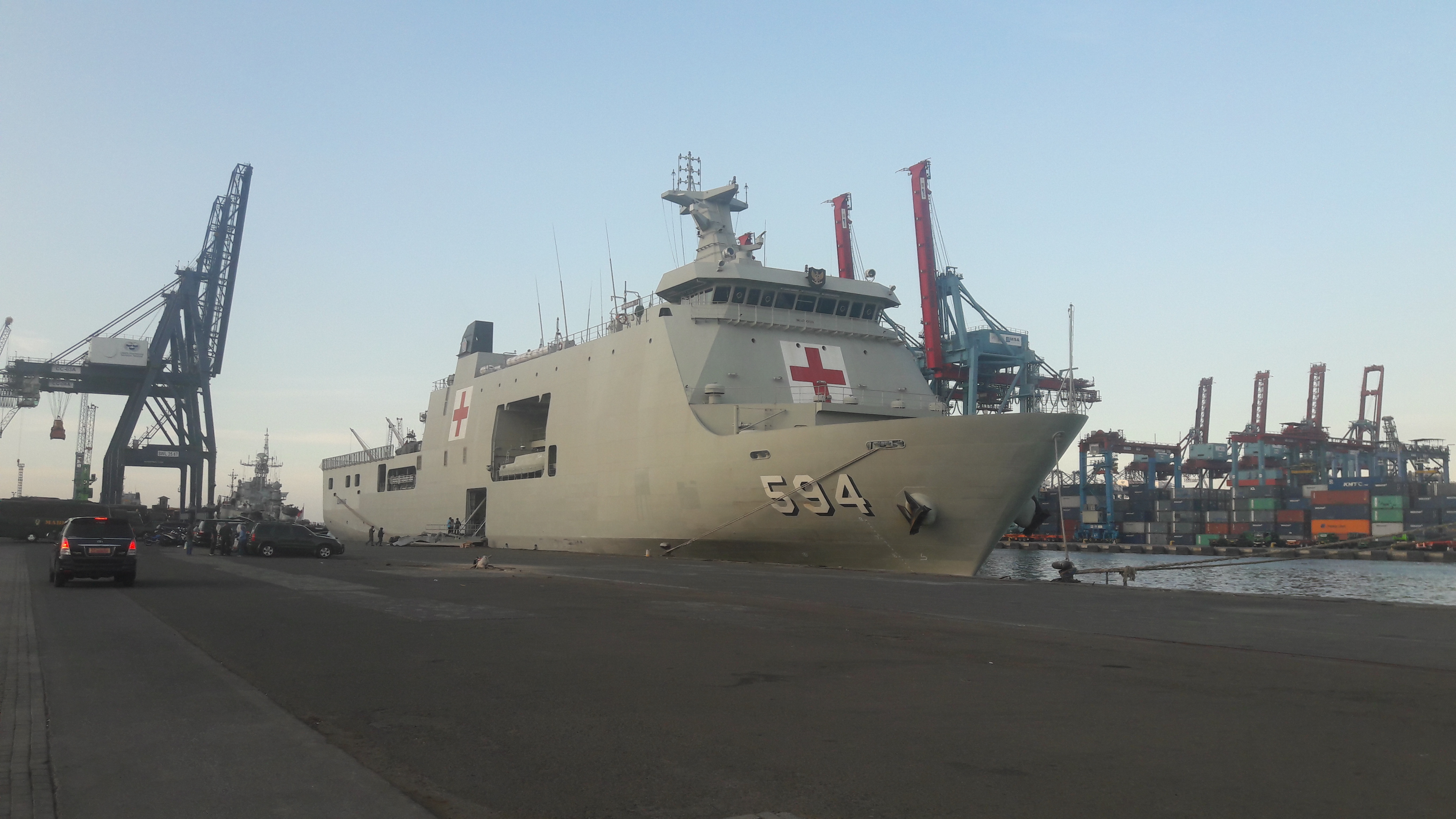
KRI Semarang docked on 30 September 2019.

She was laid down on 28 August 2017 and launched on 3 August 2018 by PT PAL Indonesia. Commissioned on 21 January 2019 as a hospital ship temporarily while the Sudirohusodo-class hospital ship were under construction.

=== COVID-19 response ===
The ship transported 68 crews of the cruise ship Diamond Princess who underwent observation for the coronavirus disease 2019 in Sebaru Kecil Island, Thousand Islands, to the Port of Tanjung Priok, North Jakarta, on 15 March 2020. She transported hand sanitizers from Singapore to Batam on 9 April 2020. On 18 May 2020, she was dispatched to carry COVID-19 testing kits and hand sanitizers from Yayasan Temasek Singapura, Singapore, to Indonesia.

=== Landing platform dock ===
In November 2023, KRI Semarang (594) was seen no longer with the red cross flag on her hull. In 2024, she was seen equipped with armaments. On 5 September 2025, she carried out Port Visit at Royal Brunei Naval Base, Brunei Darussalam. On 4 October 2025, Indonesian Navy Commander of KRI Semarang-594 Lt. Col. Agus Yunianto confirmed that KRI Semarang (594) is no longer designated as hospital assistance ship, she returned to her basic function as the Landing Platform Dock (LPD).
