= Water ambulance =

Water-based emergency medical vehicle

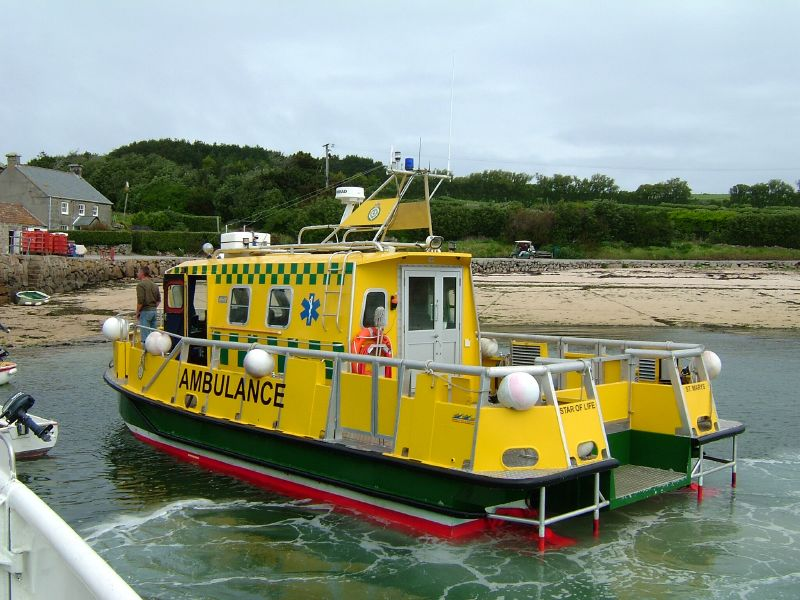
Water ambulance in Isles of Scilly, UK

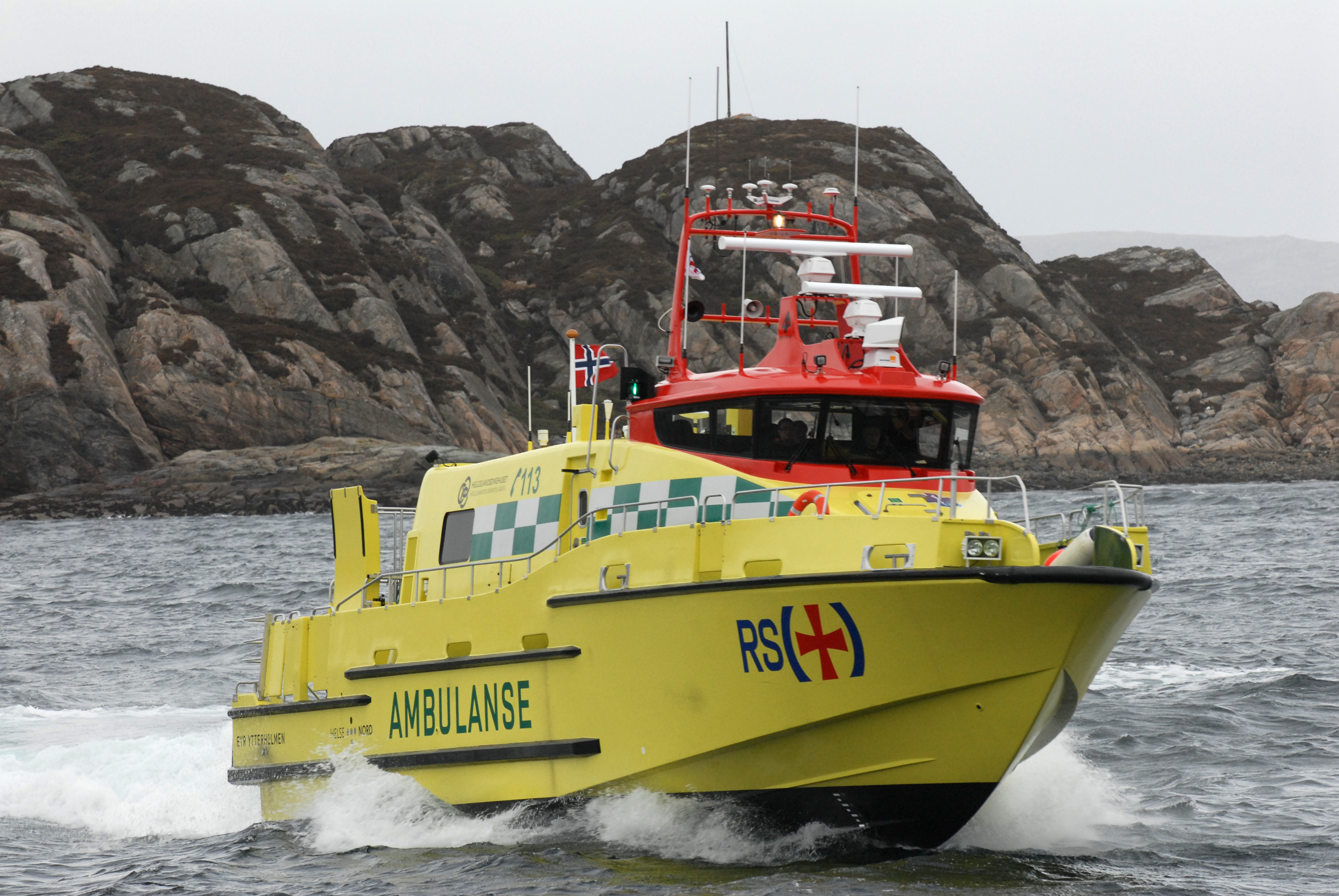
Water ambulance in Norway

A water ambulance is a boat used for emergency medical services in island areas such as the city of Venice, Italy, the Isles of Scilly, UK or the Norway fjords.

== Dubai ==
Dubai Ambulance Foundation has launched the "maritime ambulance project" in 2015 and it is improving it to eight ambulances scattered throughout the state in the next years. Dubai water ambulances or marine ambulances as they call them are stuffed with the latest advanced emergency equipment and automatic CPR.

== Sweden ==
Crews on Swedish water ambulances are normally made up of three persons, including a pilot (sailor) and at least one specialist nurse (usually ambulance, intensive care, or emergency care). The third in the crew can be an undergraduate nurse, or alternatively an ambulance healthcare provider. The medical staff are also trained crew members on the ship.

Gothenburg got its first maritime emergency in 2008. The vessel covers Gothenburg's southern archipelago, and is based in Öckerö.

== United Kingdom ==
In the UK, more precisely in the Isles of Scilly, there is a water ambulance named "Star of Life" launched in 2003 by the South Western Ambulance Service. On board are an emergency medical technician and a pilot. The Star of Life replaced the previous vessel "Santa Warna".

== Italy - Venice ==
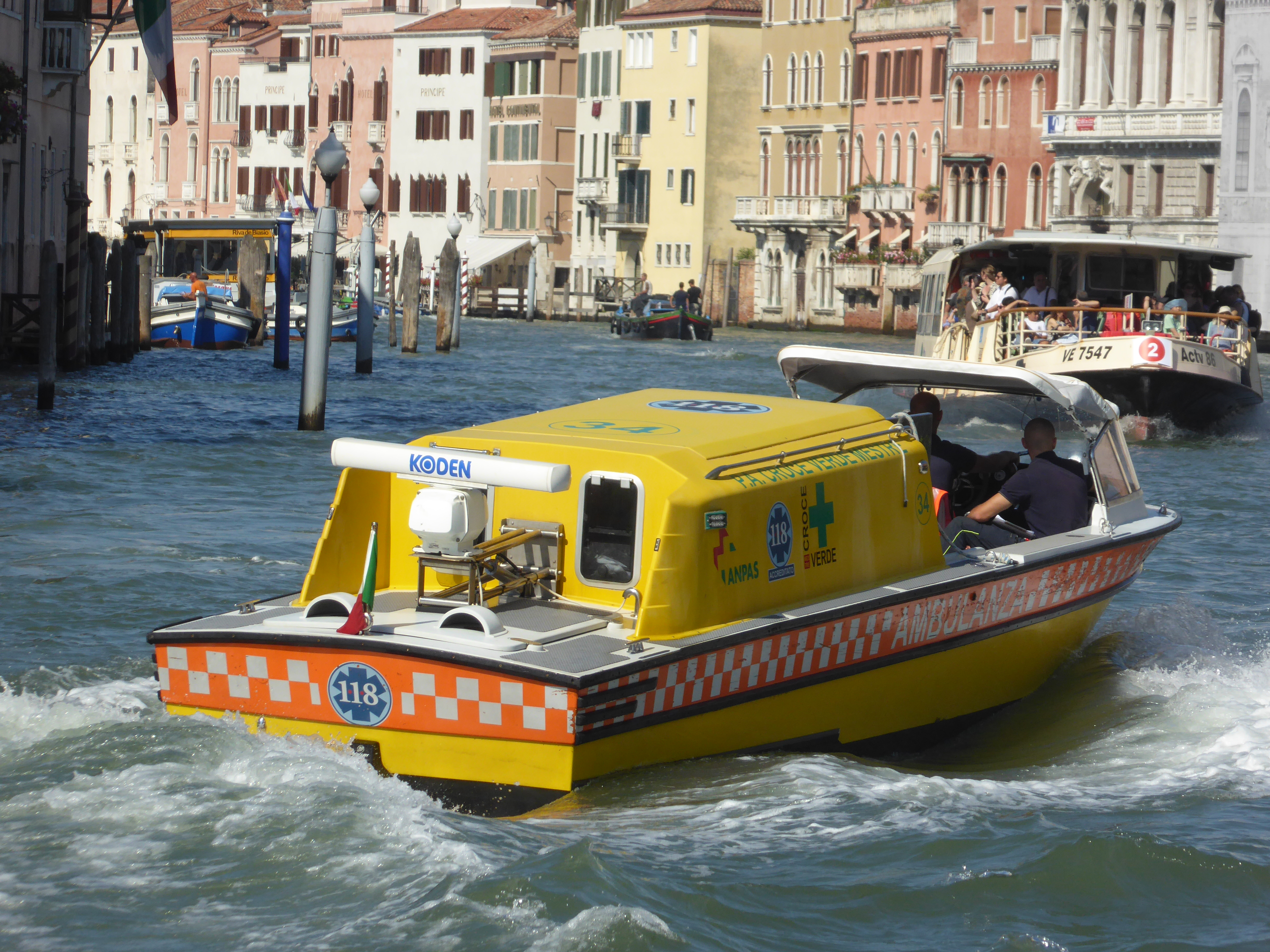
A Venetian water ambulance

Venetian water ambulances, which are part of the Venetian Emergency Medical Service (SUEM), are equipped with advanced life support equipment, such as an automated respirator, a monitor-defibrillator, and pharmaceuticals, amongst other things.

The boat crew is made up of an emergency care nurse, two emergency first level medical care technicians to bring patients on and off board, and a water ambulance pilot. In life-threatening calls, classified as code red, an emergency physician gets on board with the rest of the crew.

Non-emergency patient transport water ambulances are equipped with basic life support equipment and are crewed by two or more volunteers from the Mestre Green Cross or a private company, such as the Blue Cross.

All water ambulances are equipped with blue flashing lights, siren, two way radio and radar. Emergency water ambulances are noticeable by the emergency medical phone number 118 printed on each side.

== El Salvador ==
In November 2023, President Nayib Bukele of El Salvador inaugurated the maritime ambulances for the Emergency Care Center on the small Island of La Tasajera of 1,200 inhabitants and 2,400 inhabitants of surrounding islands. The maritime ambulances are air-conditioned, equipped to provide all the necessary care and with certified personnel for pre-hospital care in these means of transport.
