= Wahidin Soedirohoesodo =

Indonesian physician

Wahidin Soedirohoesodo (1852–1917) (in modern EYD spelling Wahidin Sudirohusodo) was a medical doctor and education reformer in the Dutch East Indies who co-founded the Javanese self-improvement society Budi Utomo. Therefore, he is sometimes considered an early figure in the Indonesian National Awakening. In 1973 he was declared a National Hero of Indonesia.

== Biography ==
Wahidin was born on 7 January 1852, in Sleman, Yogyakarta, in the Dutch East Indies. Although he was mainly of Javanese Priyayi (noble) descent, he was also descended from Daeng Kraeng Nobo, an aristocrat from Makassar who left for Java during the conquest of the Mataram Sultanate by the Dutch.

In his youth, he studied in the Tweede Europeesche Lagere School in Yogyakarta before studying at the STOVIA school in Batavia and becoming a medical doctor. After graduating from there, he was obliged to work for ten years as a government doctor. During this time he became well known for his efforts to improve the health of the common Javanese people.

After retiring as a medical doctor, Wahidin took an interest in improving educational opportunities for elite Javanese youth. He was not a radical anti-colonialist, but believed that Javanese culture could be brought up to a higher level with access to European-style education. This fit with the Dutch policy of the time, called Ethical Policy, which aimed to selectively improve education for elite Indonesians. In 1907, while touring to raise funds for the aforementioned educational goals, he visited the students in STOVIA in Batavia, where he met Soetomo, who was a young student there at the time. This encounter was to lead to the foundation of Budi Utomo in May 1908. In the first congress of Budi Utomo, Wahidin was elected as president of the organization after Raden Atmodirono stood aside from the final vote. However, before long he stood aside to allow younger leaders to take charge of the organization.

He died on 26 May 1917, in Yogyakarta.

== Honors ==
In 1973, he was declared a National Hero of Indonesia. A grand mosque in Sleman Regency, completed in 1990, was named after him.

On 14 January 2022, a hospital ship bearing his name, KRI dr. Wahidin Sudirohusodo, entered service with the Indonesian Navy.
