= KRI I Gusti Ngurah Rai =

Martadinata-class frigate

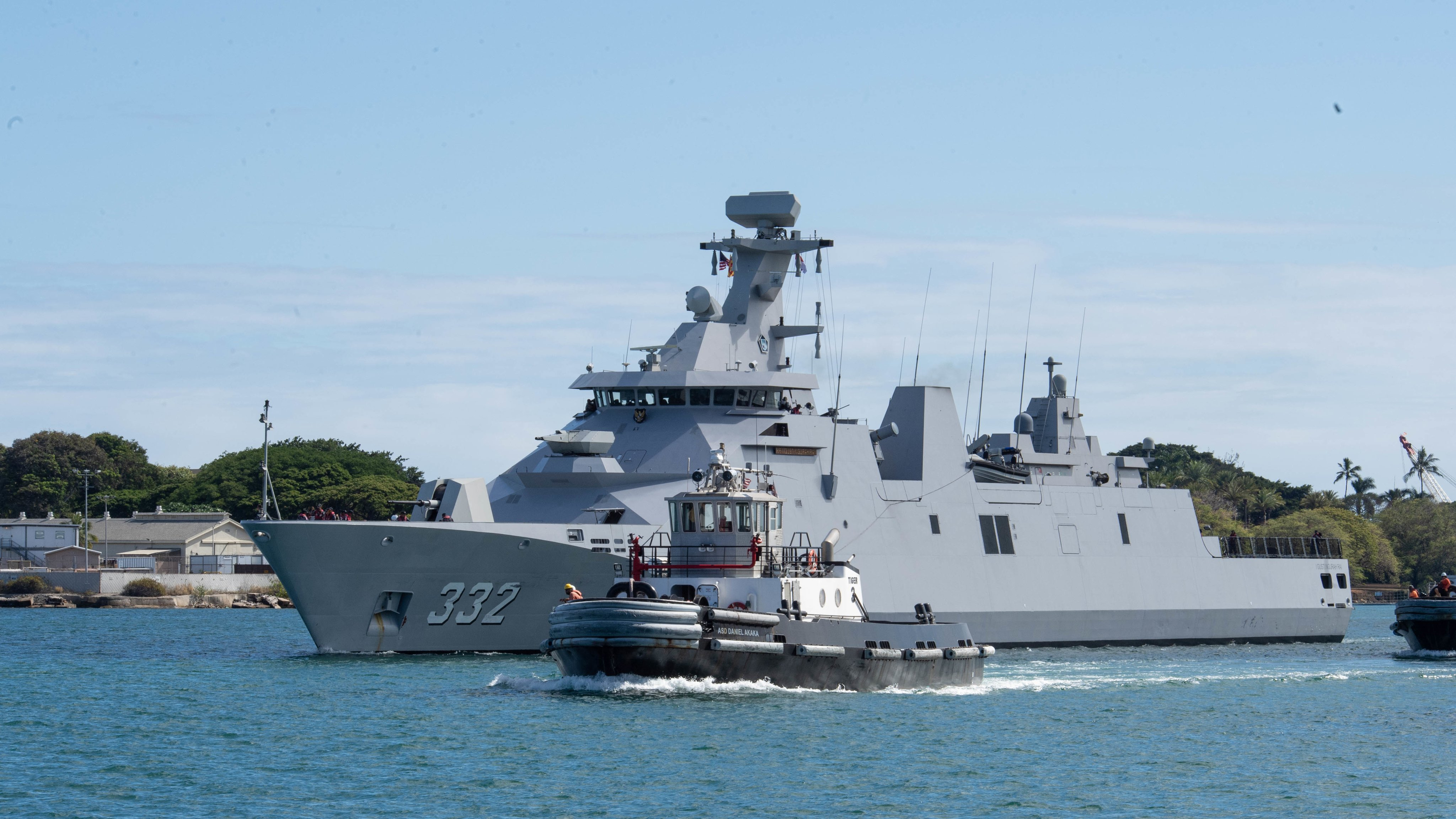
- KRI I Gusti Ngurah Rai arrived at Pearl Harbor to participate in RIMPAC 2022, 28 June 2022

History

Indonesia
- Name: KRI I Gusti Ngurah Rai
- Namesake: I Gusti Ngurah Rai
- Builder: Damen Schelde Naval Shipbuilding, Vlissingen, Netherlands; PAL Indonesia, Surabaya, Indonesia
- Laid down: 18 January 2016
- Launched: 29 September 2016
- Commissioned: 10 January 2018
- Identification: IMO number: 4908573; MMSI number: 525014087; Callsign: YCTO; Pennant number: 332
- Motto: Sanskrit: Puputan Yudha Sagara; "Fight at Sea Till Last Drop of Blood"
- Status: In active service
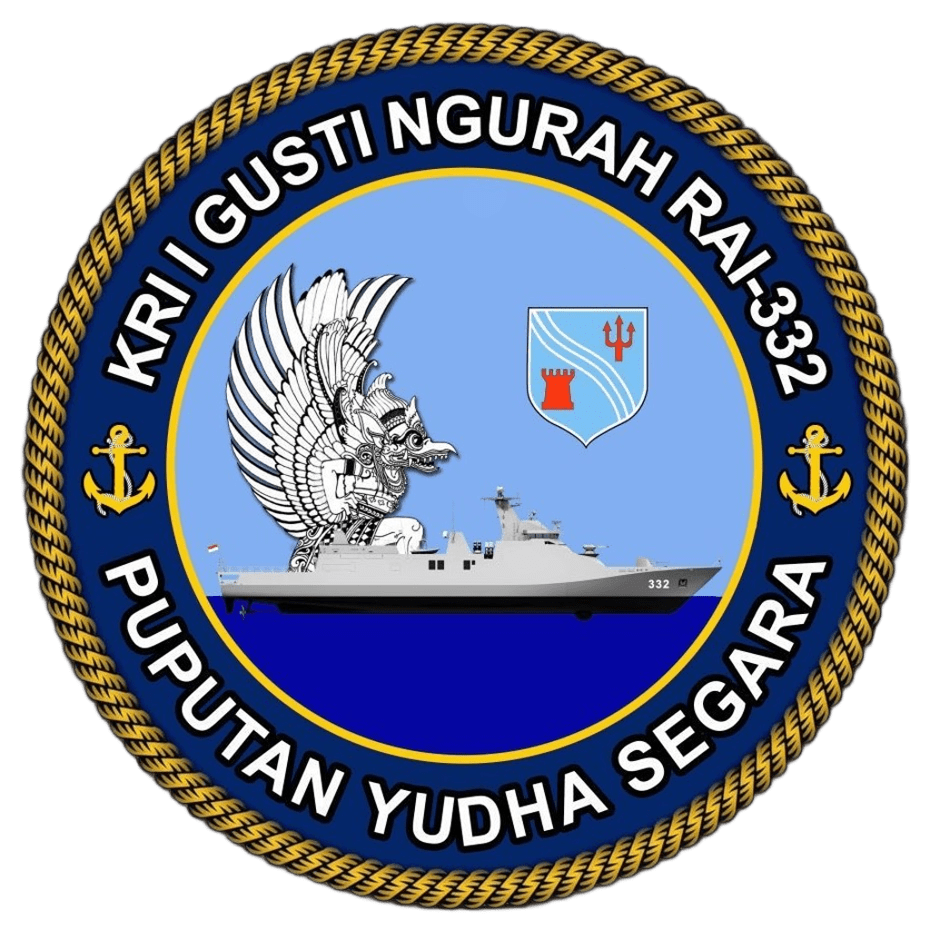
- Badge

General characteristics
- Class & type: Martadinata-class frigate
- Displacement: 2,365 tons
- Length: 105.11 m (344 ft 10 in)
- Beam: 14.02 m (46 ft 0 in)
- Draft: 3.75 m (12 ft 4 in)
- Propulsion: Propulsion Systems: Combined diesel or electric (CODOE); 2 x 10000 kW MCR diesel engines; 2 x 1300 kW MCR electric motors; 2 x double input/single output gearbox; 2 x 3.65 m CPP; Integrated platform management system; Auxiliary Systems: 6 x 735 kWE Caterpillar C32A generator sets; 1 x 180 kWE emergency gen. set; Chilled water 2 x units, redundant distribution; Fire fighting 4 x main pumps + 1 x service pump; Freshwater making capacity 2 x 14 m3/day(RO) + 2 x 7.5 m3/day (evaporators)
- Speed: Maximum: 28 knots (52 km/h; 32 mph); Cruising: 18 knots (33 km/h; 21 mph); Economy: 14 knots (26 km/h; 16 mph); Speed on E-propulsion: 15 knots (28 km/h; 17 mph)
- Range: Cruising: 3,600 nmi (6,700 km; 4,100 mi); Economy: 5,000 nmi (9,300 km; 5,800 mi); Endurance: > 20 days at sea
- Complement: 122 personnel
- Sensors & processing systems: Combat System: Thales Group TACTICOS; Search radar: SMART-S Mk2 3D multibeam surveillance radar; IFF: Thales TSB 2520; Navigation radar: Sperry Marine BridgeMasterE ARPA radar; Fire control radar: STIR 1.2 MK.2 (STING) electro-optical fire control system; Data Link: LINK Y Mk 2 datalink system; Sonar: Thales UMS 4132 Kingklip hull-mounted sonar; CAPTAS 2/UMS 4229 (VDS); Internal Communications: Thales Communication's Fibre Optical COmmunications Network (FOCON) or EID's ICCS; Satellite Comms: Nera F series; Navigation System: Raytheon Anschutz integrated navigation; Integrated Platform Management System: Imtech UniMACs 3000 Integrated Bridge System; Nautical equipment: Integrated bridge console 2 x navigation radar: ECDIS & GMDSS-A3 reference gyro
- Electronic warfare & decoys: ESM: Thales VIGILE 100; ECM: Thales Scorpion; Decoy: TERMA SKWS DLT-12T 130mm decoy launchers
- Armament: Guns: 1 x OTO Melara 76 mm 1 x 35 mm Rheinmetall Oerlikon Millennium Gun 2 x 20 mm Denel GI-2; Missiles: 12 x MBDA VL MICA 8 x Exocet MM40 Block III; Torpedoes: 2 x 3 EuroTorp B515 torpedo tubes for A244/S Mod.3 Whitehead torpedoes
- Armor: Hull material: Steel grade A / AH36
- Aircraft carried: 1 x AS565 Panther helicopter
- Aviation facilities: Helicopter hangar and flight deck

KRI I Gusti Ngurah Rai (332) is the second ship of the Martadinata-class frigate of the Indonesian Navy.

== Design and description ==
The R.E. Martadinata class of guided-missile frigates of the Indonesian Navy are SIGMA 10514 types of the Netherlands-designed Sigma family of modular naval vessels, the frigates are each built from six modules or sections, for I Gusti Ngurah Rai, five were built at the PT PAL shipyard at Surabaya, and one of the module was built at Damen Schelde Naval Shipbuilding facility in Vlissingen, the Netherlands.

I Gusti Ngurah Rai has a length of 105.11 m (344 ft 10 in), beam of 14.02 m (46 ft 0 in), draft of 3.75 m (12 ft 4 in), and her displacement is 2,365 t (2,328 long tons). The ship is powered by combined diesel or electric (CODOE) propulsion, consisted of two 10,000 kW (13,000 shp) MCR diesel engines and two 1,300 kW (1,700 shp) MCR electric motors connected to two shafts with controllable-pitch propellers. Her maximum speed is 28 knots (52 km/h), range of 5,000 nautical miles (9,300 km) while cruising at 14 knots (26 km/h), and endurance up to 20 days. The frigate has complement of 122 personnel.

She is armed with one OTO Melara 76 mm gun, one 35 mm Rheinmetall Oerlikon Millennium Gun close-in weapon system, and two 20 mm Denel GI-2 autocannons. For surface warfare, I Gusti Ngurah Rai are equipped with eight Exocet MM40 Block III anti-ship missiles, and twelve vertical launching system cell for MBDA MICA anti-aircraft missiles. For anti-submarine warfare, she is equipped with two triple 324 mm EuroTorp B515 torpedo tubes for A244/S Mod.3 Whitehead torpedoes.

Her electronic system and sensors consisted of Thales Group TACTICOS combat management system with ten Multifunction Operator Consoles (MOC) Mk.4, SMART-S Mk 2 3D multibeam surveillance radar integrated with Thales TSB 2520 IFF system, Sperry Marine BridgeMasterE ARPA navigation radar, STIR 1.2 MK.2 (STING) electro-optical fire control system, LINK Y Mk 2 datalink system, Thales UMS 4132 Kingklip medium frequency active/passive hull-mounted sonar, CAPTAS 2/UMS 4229 variable depth sonar, Thales VIGILE 100 ESM, Thales Scorpion ECM, and TERMA SKWS DLT-12T 130mm decoy launchers located in port and starboard.

I Gusti Ngurah Rai also has a hangar and flight deck at stern and could accommodate one <10 tons helicopter. The ship is usually assigned with a Eurocopter AS565 Panther helicopter. The frigate also carries two rigid-hull inflatable boats.

== Construction and career ==
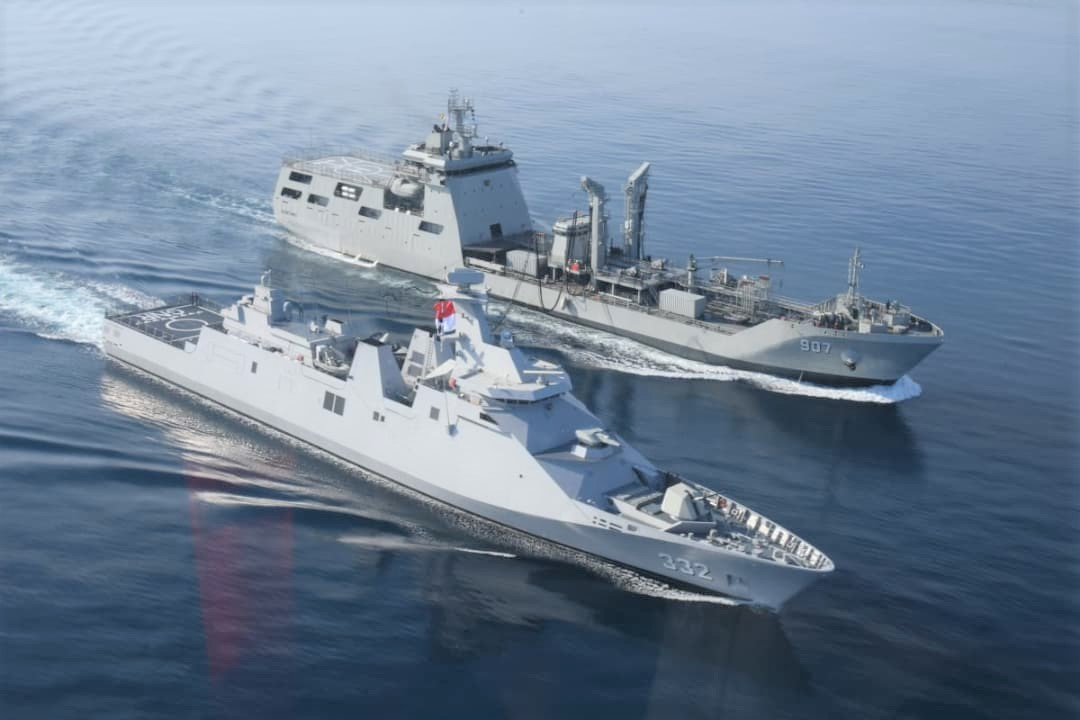
KRI I Gusti Ngurah Rai (332) performing RAS with KRI Bontang (907).

The ship construction was started with the first steel cutting ceremony on 17 September 2014 at PAL Indonesia shipyard in Surabaya. Her keel was laid down on 18 January 2016. The Dutch-built module was transported to PAL Indonesia shipyard for final assembly. The frigate was launched on 29 September 2016. She underwent her first sea trial on 26 April 2017. The ship was handed over to the Indonesian Navy on 30 October 2017. I Gusti Ngurah Rai was officially commissioned on 10 January 2018 by Commander of the Indonesian National Armed Forces Air Chief Marshal Hadi Tjahjanto at Benoa Port, Bali.

The ship finished her FFBNW (Fit For But Not With) refit project, which consisted of four work stages, and was formally handed over to the Indonesian Navy on 3 November 2020. The refit project included the installation of the Rheinmetall Oerlikon Millennium Gun close-in weapon system and integration of the Sensor, Weapon and Command (SEWACO) system.

In November 2021, she and KRI Diponegoro participated with US Pacific Fleet for the joint exercise CARAT Indonesia 2021.

In 29 June to 4 August 2022, she participated in the 2022 RIMPAC in the Hawaiian Islands.

I Gusti Ngurah Rai, along with Raden Eddy Martadinata, Abdul Halim Perdanakusuma, Karel Satsuitubun, Fatahillah, Malahayati, Sultan Hasanuddin, Sultan Iskandar Muda, Sultan Nuku, dr. Wahidin Sudirohusodo, Surabaya, Teluk Banten, Tarakan and Bima Suci were deployed in waters off Nusa Dua, Bali to patrol the area during 2022 G20 Bali summit on 15–16 November 2022.

On 23 July 2026, KRI I Gusti Ngurah Rai (GNR)-332 arrived at Golden Horn Bay in Vladivostok, Russia to participate in Exercise Orruda 2026, a bilateral joint naval exercise between the Indonesian Navy and the Russian Federation Navy.

== Gallery ==
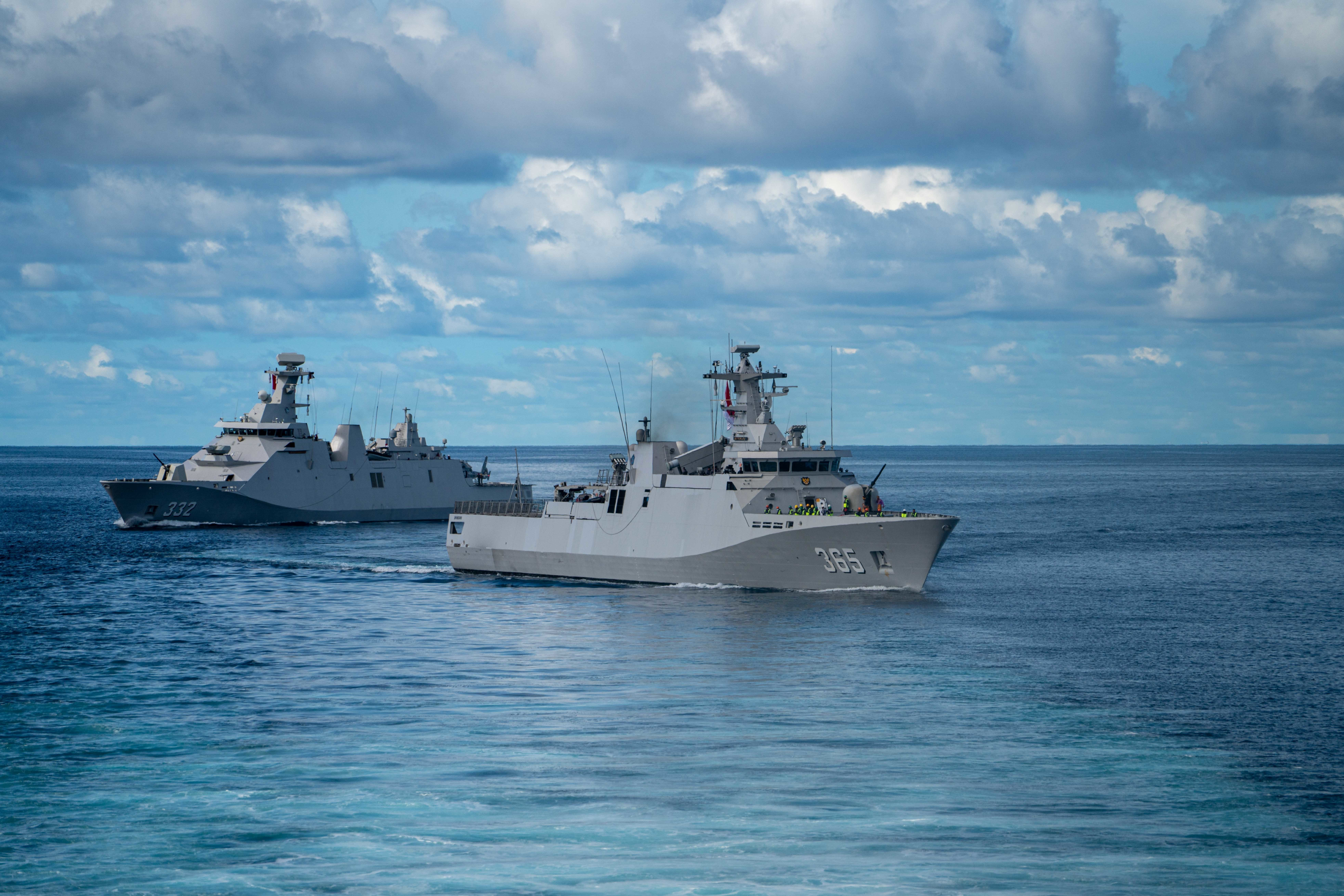
KRI I Gusti Ngurah Rai (332) and KRI Diponegoro (365) during CARAT Indonesia 2021.

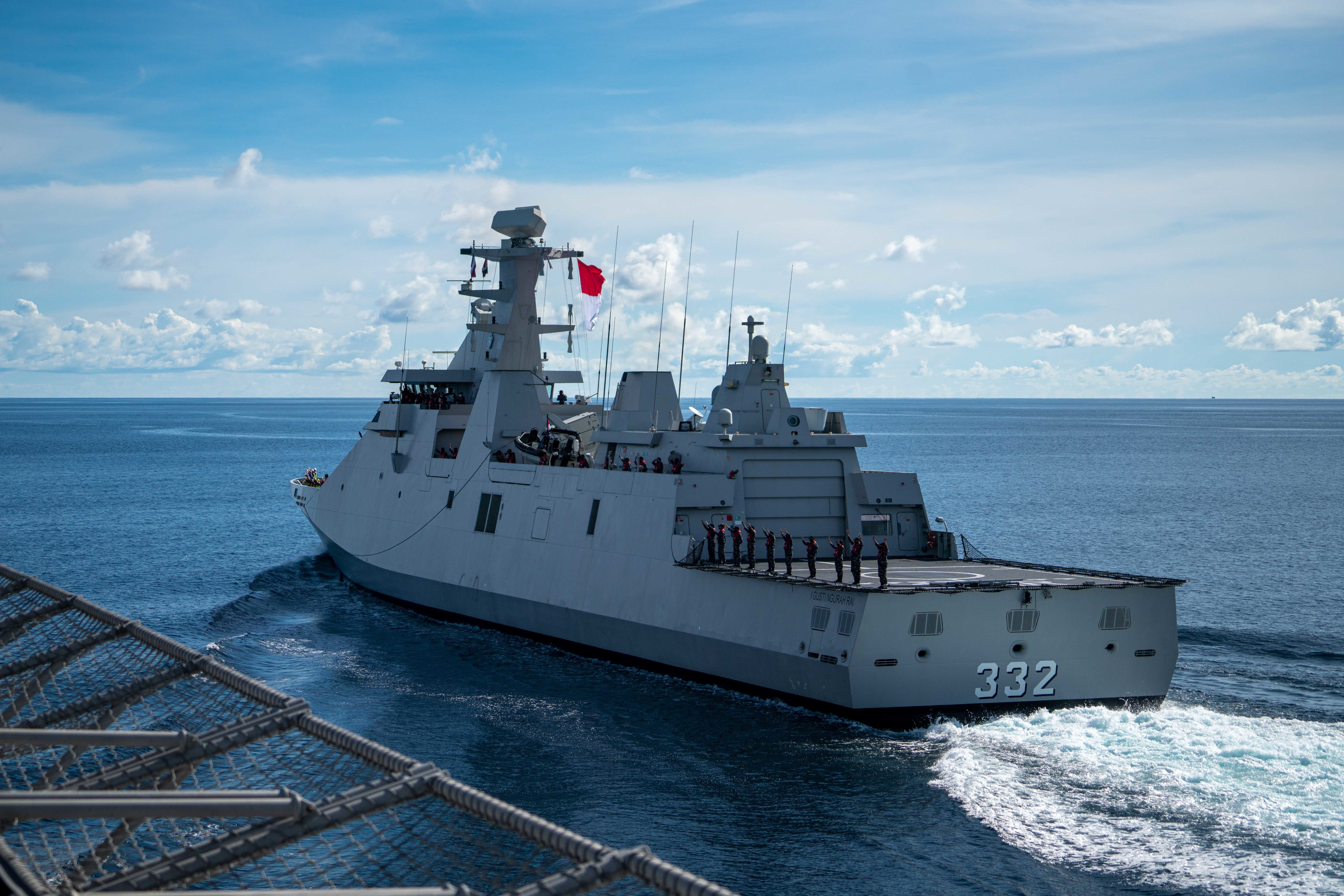
KRI I Gusti Ngurah Rai (332) during CARAT Indonesia 2021, photo taken from USS Jackson (LCS 6).

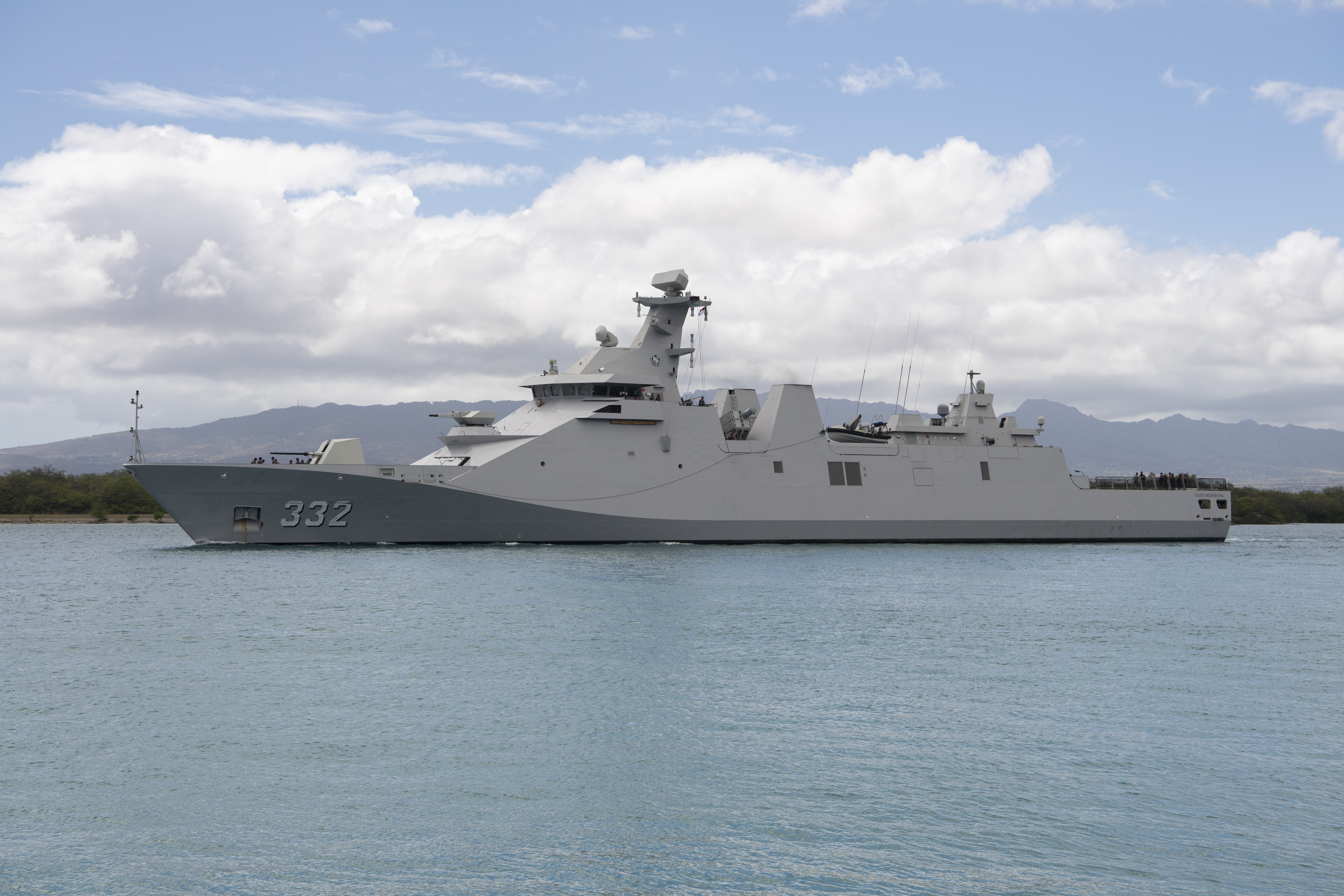
KRI I Gusti Ngurah Rai (332) departs Pearl Harbor to begin the at-sea phase of Rim of the Pacific (RIMPAC) 2022.

== See also ==
- KRI Raden Eddy Martadinata
