= KRI Raden Eddy Martadinata =

Martadinata-class frigate

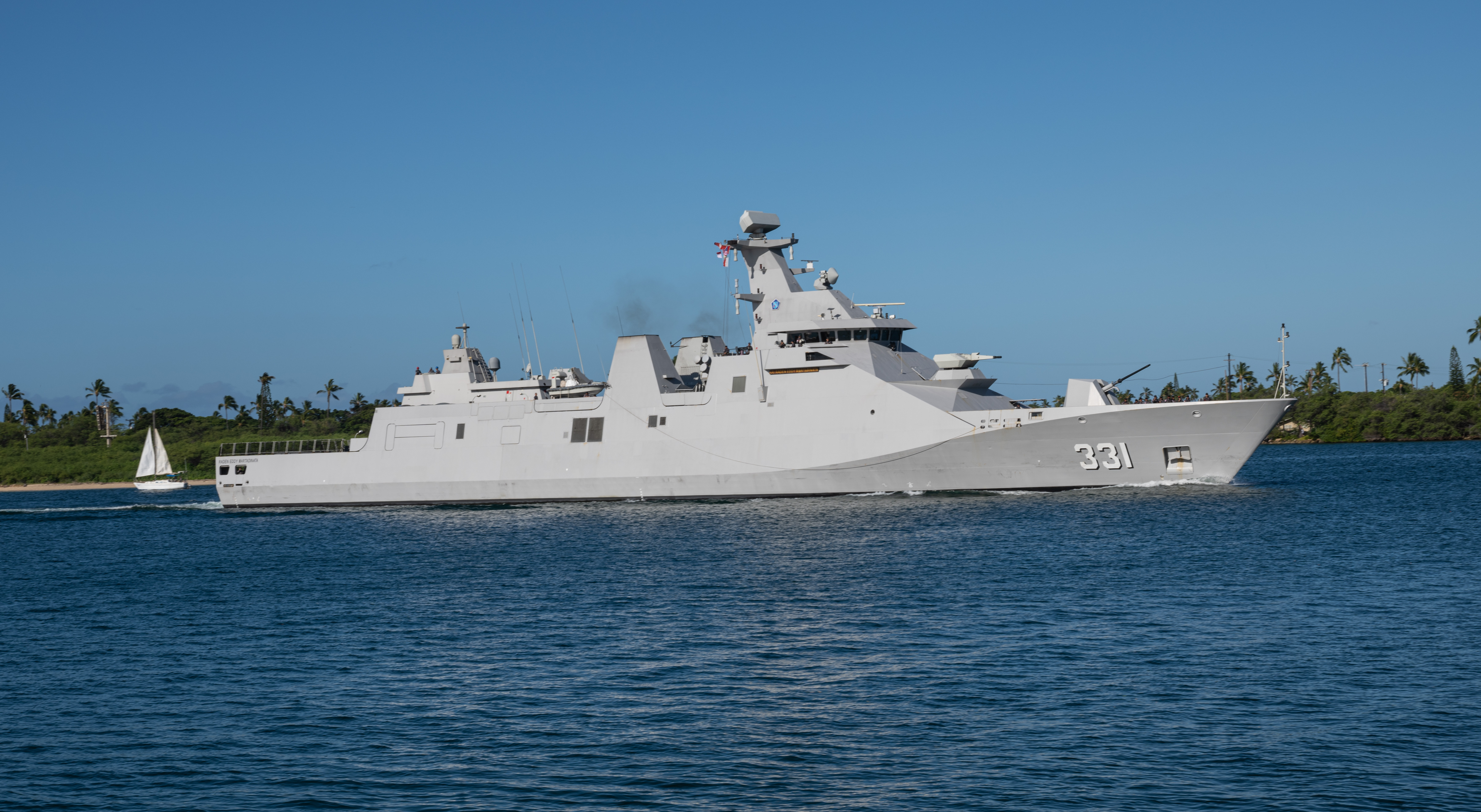
- KRI Raden Eddy Martadinata arriving at Joint Base Pearl Harbor-Hickam for RIMPAC 2024 on 25 June 2024.

History

Indonesia
- Name: KRI Raden Eddy Martadinata
- Namesake: Eddy Martadinata
- Builder: Damen Schelde Naval Shipbuilding, Vlissingen, Netherlands; PAL Indonesia, Surabaya, Indonesia
- Laid down: 16 April 2014
- Launched: 18 January 2016
- Commissioned: 7 April 2017
- Home port: Surabaya
- Identification: IMO number: 4559566; MMSI number: 525014086; Callsign: YCTN; Pennant number: 331
- Motto: Tangguh, Perkasa, Pengawal Nusantara
- Status: In active service
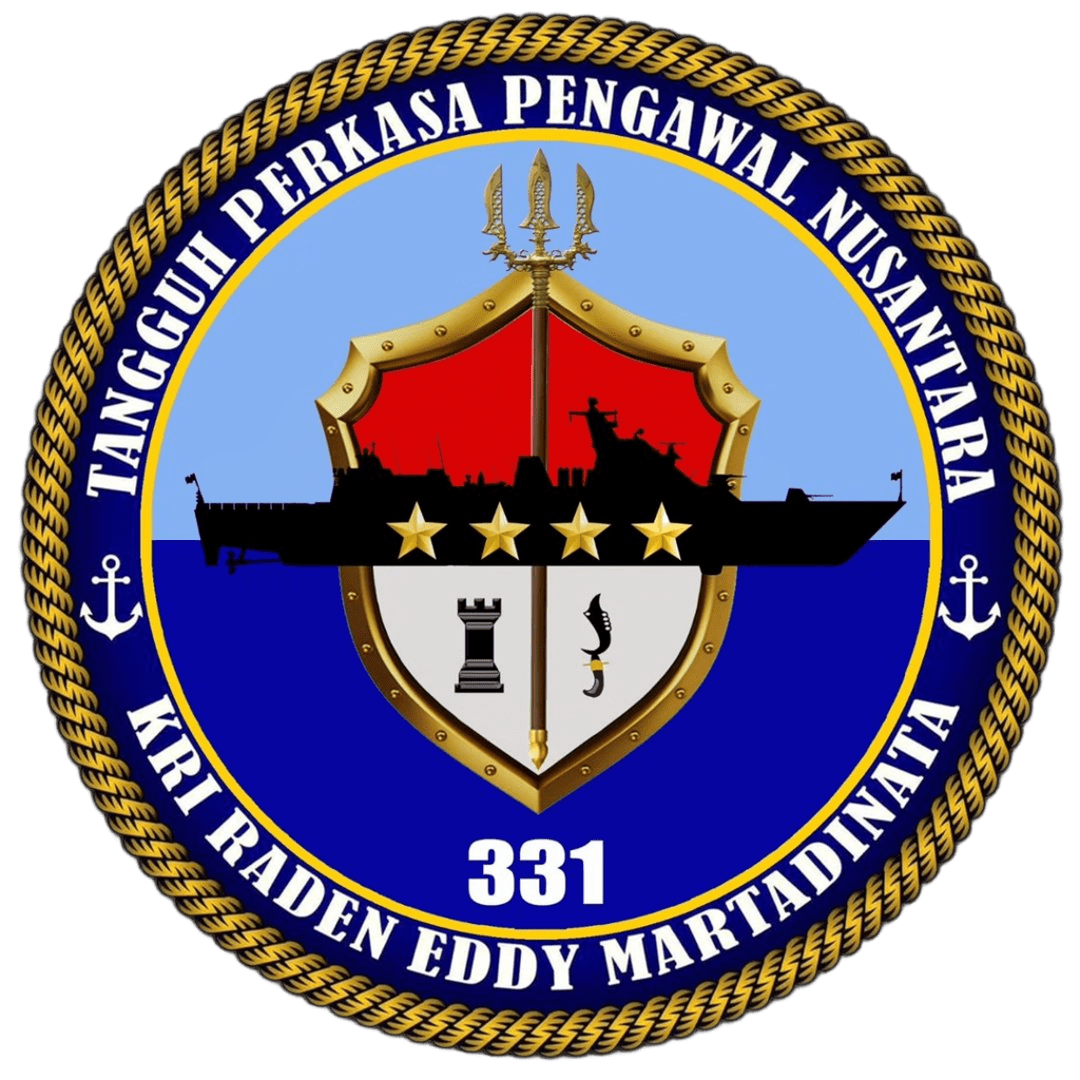
- Badge

General characteristics
- Class & type: Martadinata-class frigate
- Displacement: 2,365 tons
- Length: 105.11 m (344 ft 10 in)
- Beam: 14.02 m (46 ft 0 in)
- Draft: 3.75 m (12 ft 4 in)
- Propulsion: Propulsion Systems: Combined diesel or electric (CODOE); 2 x 10000 kW MCR diesel engines; 2 x 1300 kW MCR electric motors; 2 x double input/single output gearbox; 2 x 3.65 m CPP; Integrated platform management system; Auxiliary Systems: 6 x 735 kWE Caterpillar C32A generator sets; 1 x 180 kWE emergency gen. set; Chilled water 2 x units, redundant distribution; Fire fighting 4 x main pumps + 1 x service pump; Freshwater making capacity 2 x 14 m3/day(RO) + 2 x 7.5 m3/day (evaporators)
- Speed: Maximum: 28 knots (52 km/h; 32 mph); Cruising: 18 knots (33 km/h; 21 mph); Economy: 14 knots (26 km/h; 16 mph); Speed on E-propulsion: 15 knots (28 km/h; 17 mph)
- Range: Cruising: 3,600 nmi (6,700 km; 4,100 mi); Economy: 5,000 nmi (9,300 km; 5,800 mi); Endurance: > 20 days at sea
- Complement: 122 personnel
- Sensors & processing systems: Combat System: Thales Group TACTICOS; Search radar: SMART-S Mk2 3D multibeam surveillance radar; IFF: Thales TSB 2520; Navigation radar: Sperry Marine BridgeMasterE ARPA radar; Fire control radar: STIR 1.2 MK.2 (STING) electro-optical fire control system; Data Link: LINK Y Mk 2 datalink system; Sonar: Thales UMS 4132 Kingklip hull-mounted sonar; CAPTAS 2/UMS 4229 (VDS); Internal Communications: Thales Communication's Fibre Optical COmmunications Network (FOCON) or EID's ICCS; Satellite Comms: Nera F series; Navigation System: Raytheon Anschutz integrated navigation; Integrated Platform Management System: Imtech UniMACs 3000 Integrated Bridge System; Nautical equipment: Integrated bridge console 2 x navigation radar: ECDIS & GMDSS-A3 reference gyro
- Electronic warfare & decoys: ESM: Thales VIGILE 100; ECM: Thales Scorpion; Decoy: TERMA SKWS DLT-12T 130mm decoy launchers
- Armament: Guns: 1 x OTO Melara 76 mm 1 x 35 mm Rheinmetall Oerlikon Millennium Gun 2 x 20 mm Denel GI-2; Missiles: 12 x MBDA VL MICA 8 x Exocet MM40 Block III; Torpedoes: 2 x 3 EuroTorp B515 torpedo tubes for A244/S Mod.3 Whitehead torpedoes
- Armor: Hull material: Steel grade A / AH36
- Aircraft carried: 1 x AS565 Panther helicopter
- Aviation facilities: Helicopter hangar and flight deck

KRI Raden Eddy Martadinata (331) is the lead ship of the Martadinata-class frigates of the Indonesian Navy.

== Design and description ==
The R.E. Martadinata class of guided-missile frigates of the Indonesian Navy are SIGMA 10514 types of the Netherlands-designed Sigma family of modular naval vessels, the frigates are each built from six modules or sections, four built at the PT PAL shipyard at Surabaya, while the other two, consisted of the power plant and the bridge and command centre modules, at Damen Schelde Naval Shipbuilding in the Netherlands.

Raden Eddy Martadinata has a length of 105.11 m (344 ft 10 in), beam of 14.02 m (46 ft 0 in), draft of 3.75 m (12 ft 4 in), and her displacement is 2,365 t (2,328 long tons). The ship is powered by combined diesel or electric (CODOE) propulsion, consisted of two 10,000 kW (13,000 shp) MCR diesel engines and two 1,300 kW (1,700 shp) MCR electric motors connected to two shafts with controllable-pitch propellers. Her maximum speed is 28 knots (52 km/h), range of 5,000 nautical miles (9,300 km) while cruising at 14 knots (26 km/h), and endurance up to 20 days. The frigate has complement of 122 personnel.

She is armed with one OTO Melara 76 mm gun, one 35 mm Rheinmetall Oerlikon Millennium Gun close-in weapon system, and two 20 mm Denel GI-2 autocannons. For surface warfare, Raden Eddy Martadinata are equipped with eight Exocet MM40 Block III anti-ship missiles, and twelve vertical launching system cell for MBDA MICA anti-aircraft missiles. For anti-submarine warfare, she is equipped with two triple 324 mm EuroTorp B515 torpedo tubes for A244/S Mod.3 Whitehead torpedoes.

Her electronic system and sensors consisted of Thales Group TACTICOS combat management system with ten Multifunction Operator Consoles (MOC) Mk.4, SMART-S Mk 2 3D multibeam surveillance radar integrated with Thales TSB 2520 IFF system, Sperry Marine BridgeMasterE ARPA navigation radar, STIR 1.2 MK.2 (STING) electro-optical fire control system, LINK Y Mk 2 datalink system, Thales UMS 4132 Kingklip medium frequency active/passive hull-mounted sonar, CAPTAS 2/UMS 4229 variable depth sonar, Thales VIGILE 100 ESM, Thales Scorpion ECM, and TERMA SKWS DLT-12T 130mm decoy launchers located in port and starboard.

Raden Eddy Martadinata also has a hangar and flight deck at stern and could accommodate one <10 tons helicopter. The ship is usually assigned with a Eurocopter AS565 Panther helicopter. The frigate also carries two rigid-hull inflatable boats.

== Construction ==
The frigate construction was started with the first steel cutting ceremony on 15 January 2014 at PAL Indonesia shipyard in Surabaya, attended by then Minister of Defense Purnomo Yusgiantoro. On the same day, another first steel cutting ceremony was done at Damen Schelde Naval Shipbuilding facility in Vlissingen to start the construction of two Dutch-built modules. Her keel was laid down on 16 April 2014 at the PAL Indonesia shipyard, which also assembled the ship's six modules. The ship was launched on 18 January 2016. She completed her sea trials on 7 September 2016 and was delivered to the Ministry of Defense of Indonesia on 23 January 2017. Raden Eddy Martadinata was officially commissioned on 7 April 2017 by the Minister of Defense Ryamizard Ryacudu at Pondok Dayung naval base in Tanjung Priok, North Jakarta.

The ship entered PAL Indonesia drydock in Surabaya at around July–August 2018 for FFBNW (Fit For But Not With) refit project, which consisted of four work stages and lasted 17 months. The refit project included the installation of electronic warfare suites and the Rheinmetall Oerlikon Millennium Gun close-in weapon system. The refit was finished on 4 December 2019.

== Operational history ==
In July 2018, she participated in the RIMPAC 2018.

Raden Eddy Martadinata, along with I Gusti Ngurah Rai, Abdul Halim Perdanakusuma, Karel Satsuitubun, Fatahillah, Malahayati, Sultan Hasanuddin, Sultan Iskandar Muda, Sultan Nuku, dr. Wahidin Sudirohusodo, Surabaya, Teluk Banten, Tarakan and Bima Suci were deployed in waters off Nusa Dua, Bali to patrol the area during 2022 G20 Bali summit on 15–16 November 2022.

On 25 June 2024, she arrived at Joint Base Pearl Harbor-Hickam, Hawaii, to participate in RIMPAC 2024.

In September 2025, KRI Raden Eddy Martadinata and KRI dr. Wahidin Sudirohusodo (991) in the 2025 Port Visit Task Force, carried out diplomatic and humanitarian mission to Papua New Guinea to strengthen bilateral ties. The ships arrived at T-Wharf, Port Moresby, Papua New Guinea on 14 September 2025. After completed the diplomatic and humanitarian mission, KRI Raden Eddy Martadinata and KRI dr. Wahidin Sudirohusodo returned to Indonesia on 18 September 2025, arrived at Sorong, Indonesia on 26 September 2025.

In March 2026, the ship participated in the Royal Australian Navy's Exercise Kakadu Fleet Review on Sydney Harbour.

== Gallery ==
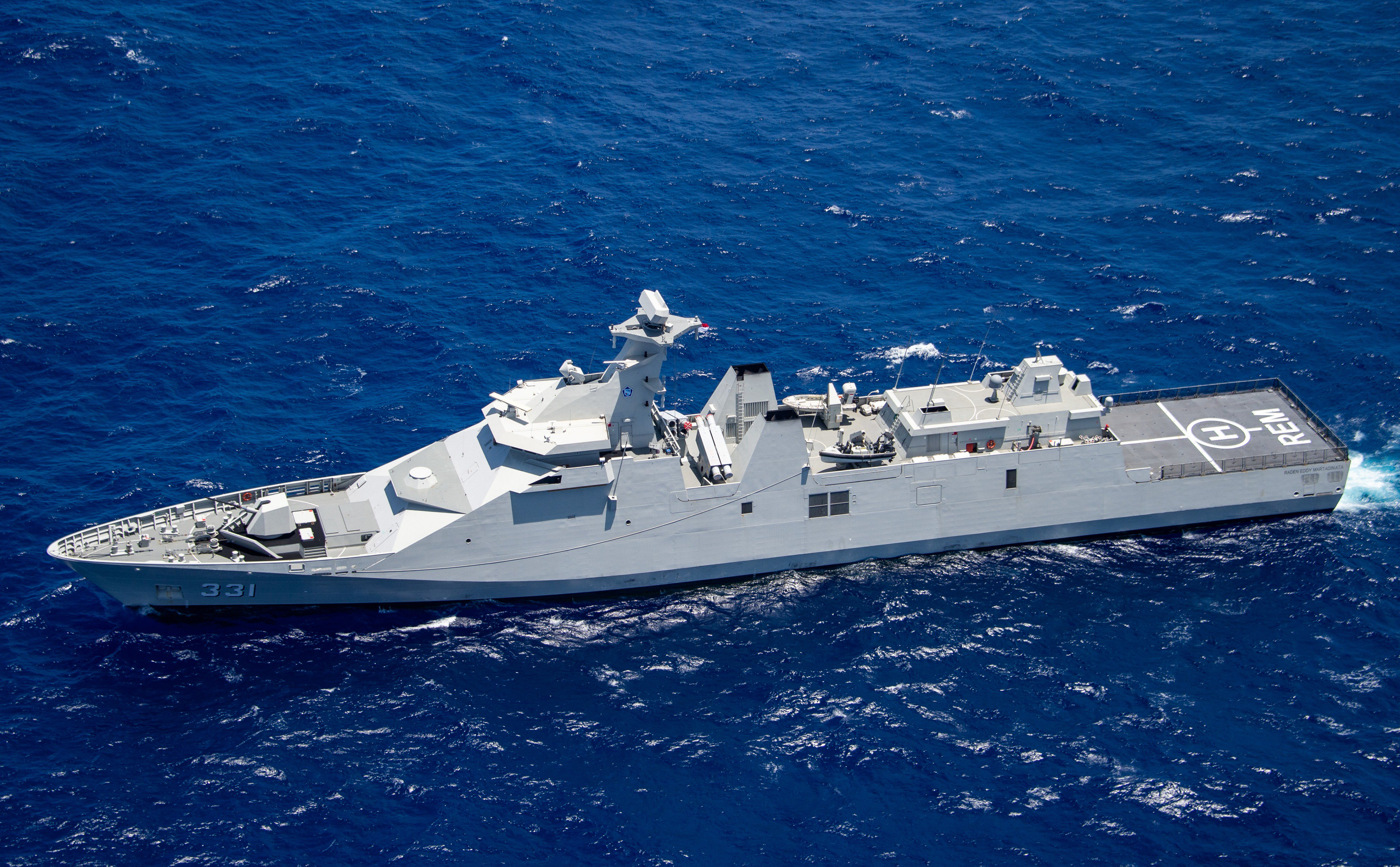
KRI Raden Eddy Martadinata (331) sails with partner nations during RIMPAC 2018.
