= KRI Sultan Iskandar Muda (367) =

Diponegoro-class corvette of the Indonesian Navy

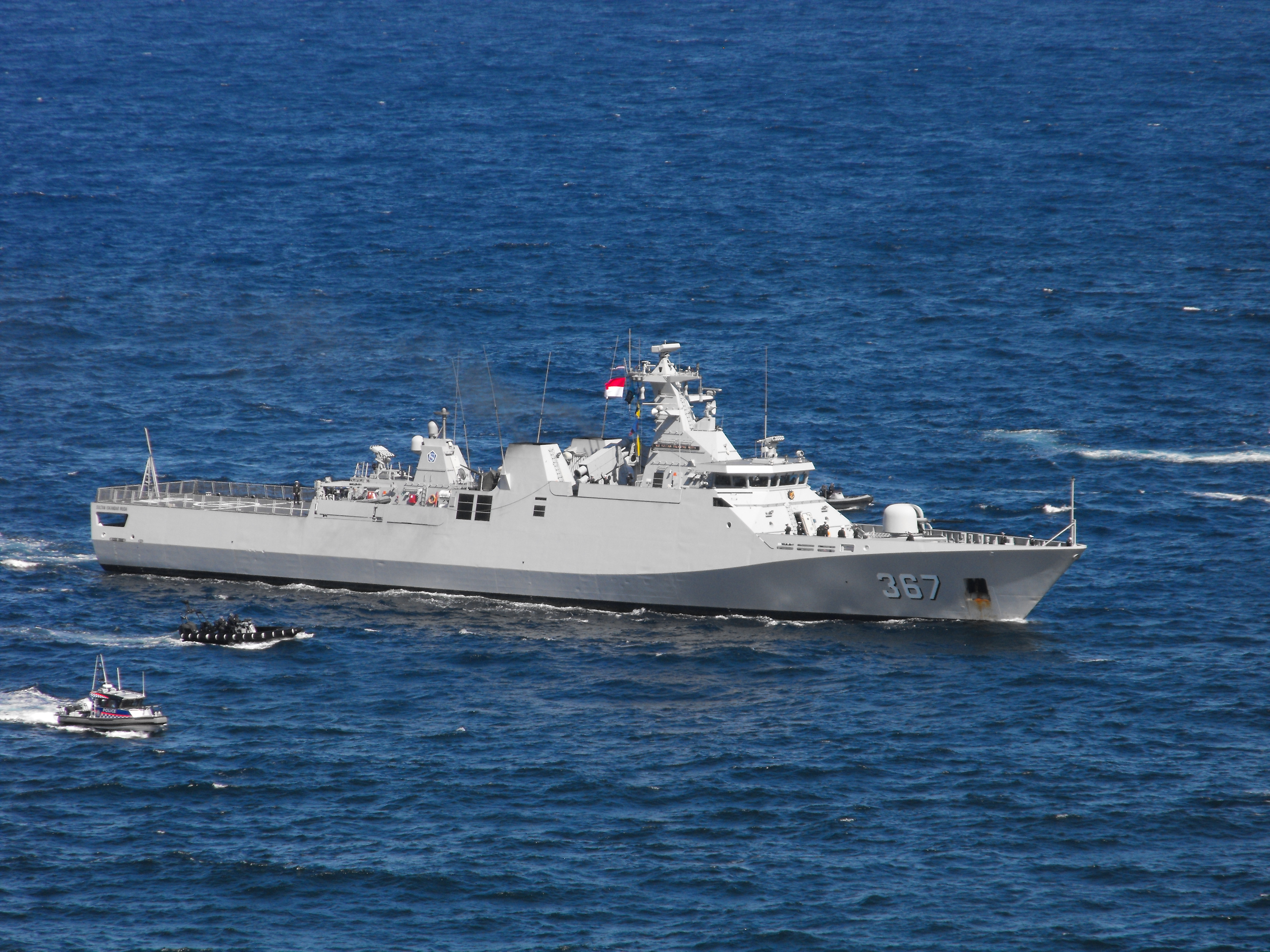
- KRI Sultan Iskandar Muda entering Sydney Harbour on 4 October 2013.

History

Indonesia
- Name: Sultan Iskandar Muda
- Namesake: Iskandar Muda
- Builder: Damen Group, Vlissingen
- Laid down: 8 May 2006
- Launched: 24 November 2007
- Commissioned: 18 October 2008
- Identification: IMO number: 9397963; MMSI number: 525014044; Callsign: PLEQ; Pennant number: 367
- Status: Active

General characteristics (Corvette 9113)
- Type: Diponegoro-class corvette
- Displacement: 1,692 tons
- Length: 90.71 m (297 ft 7 in)
- Beam: 13.02 m (42 ft 9 in)
- Draft: 3.60 m (11 ft 10 in)
- Propulsion: 2 × SEMT Pielstick 20PA6B STC rated at 8910 kW each driving a lightweight Geislinger coupling combination BE 72/20/125N + BF 110/50/2H (steel – composite coupling combination); 4 × Caterpillar 3406C TA generator rated at 350 kW each; 1 × Caterpillar 3304B emergency generator rated at 105 kW; 2 × shaft with Rolls-Royce Kamewa 5 bladed controllable pitch propeller; 2 × Renk ASL94 single step reduction gear with passive roll stabilization
- Speed: Maximum: 28 knots (52 km/h; 32 mph); Cruising: 18 knots (33 km/h; 21 mph); Economy: 14 knots (26 km/h; 16 mph)
- Range: Cruising speed at 18 kn (33 km/h; 21 mph): 3,600 nmi (6,700 km; 4,100 mi); Economy speed at 14 kn (26 km/h; 16 mph): 4,800 nmi (8,900 km; 5,500 mi)
- Complement: 20-80 crew
- Sensors & processing systems: Combat System: Thales Group TACTICOS with 4 x Multifunction Operator Console Mk 3 2H; Search radar: MW08 3D multibeam surveillance radar; IFF: Thales TSB 2525 Mk XA (integrated with MW08); Navigation radar: Sperry Marine BridgeMasterE ARPA radar; Fire control radar: LIROD Mk 2 tracking radar; Data Link: LINK Y Mk 2 datalink system; Sonar: Thales UMS 4132 Kingklip medium frequency active/passive ASW hull mounted sonar; Internal Communications: Thales Communication's Fibre Optical COmmunications Network (FOCON) or EID's ICCS where on-board users have access to internal and/or external communication channels and integrated remote control of communications equipment; Satellite Comms: Nera F series; Navigation System: Raytheon Anschutz integrated navigation; Integrated Platform Management System: Imtech UniMACs 3000 Integrated Bridge System
- Electronic warfare & decoys: ESM: Thales DR3000; ECM: Racal Scorpion 2L; Decoy: TERMA SKWS, DLT-12T 130mm decoy launchers, port, starboard
- Armament: Guns: 1 × Oto Melara 76 mm gun (A position) 2 × 20 mm Denel GI-2 gun (B position); Missiles: 2 × quad (8) Mistral TETRAL Anti-air missile, forward & aft 4 × Exocet MM40 Block III anti-surface vessel missile; Torpedoes: 2 × triple launchers for 3A 244S Mode II/EuroTorp MU 90 torpedoes
- Aviation facilities: Helipad

KRI Sultan Iskandar Muda (367) is a Diponegoro-class corvette of the Indonesian Navy.

== Development ==
The Diponegoro-class guided-missile corvettes of the Indonesian Navy are SIGMA 9113 types of the Netherlands-designed Sigma family of modular naval vessels, named after Indonesian Prince Diponegoro. Currently there are 4 Diponegoro-class corvette in service.

== Construction and career ==
Sultan Iskandar Muda was laid down on 8 May 2006 and launched on 24 November 2007 by Damen Group, Vlissingen. She was commissioned on 18 October 2008.

The ship, along with Sultan Hasanuddin, Fatahillah, Malahayati, Sultan Nuku, Raden Eddy Martadinata, I Gusti Ngurah Rai, Abdul Halim Perdanakusuma, Karel Satsuitubun, dr. Wahidin Sudirohusodo, Surabaya, Teluk Banten, Tarakan and Bima Suci were deployed in waters off Nusa Dua, Bali to patrol the area during 2022 G20 Bali summit on 15–16 November 2022.

On 28 December 2024, the Sultan Iskandar Muda arrived at the Port of Colombo, Sri Lanka, for an official visit under the command of Commander Anugerah Annurullah. The vessel departed the island following the conclusion of the visit on 30 December 2024.

== Gallery ==
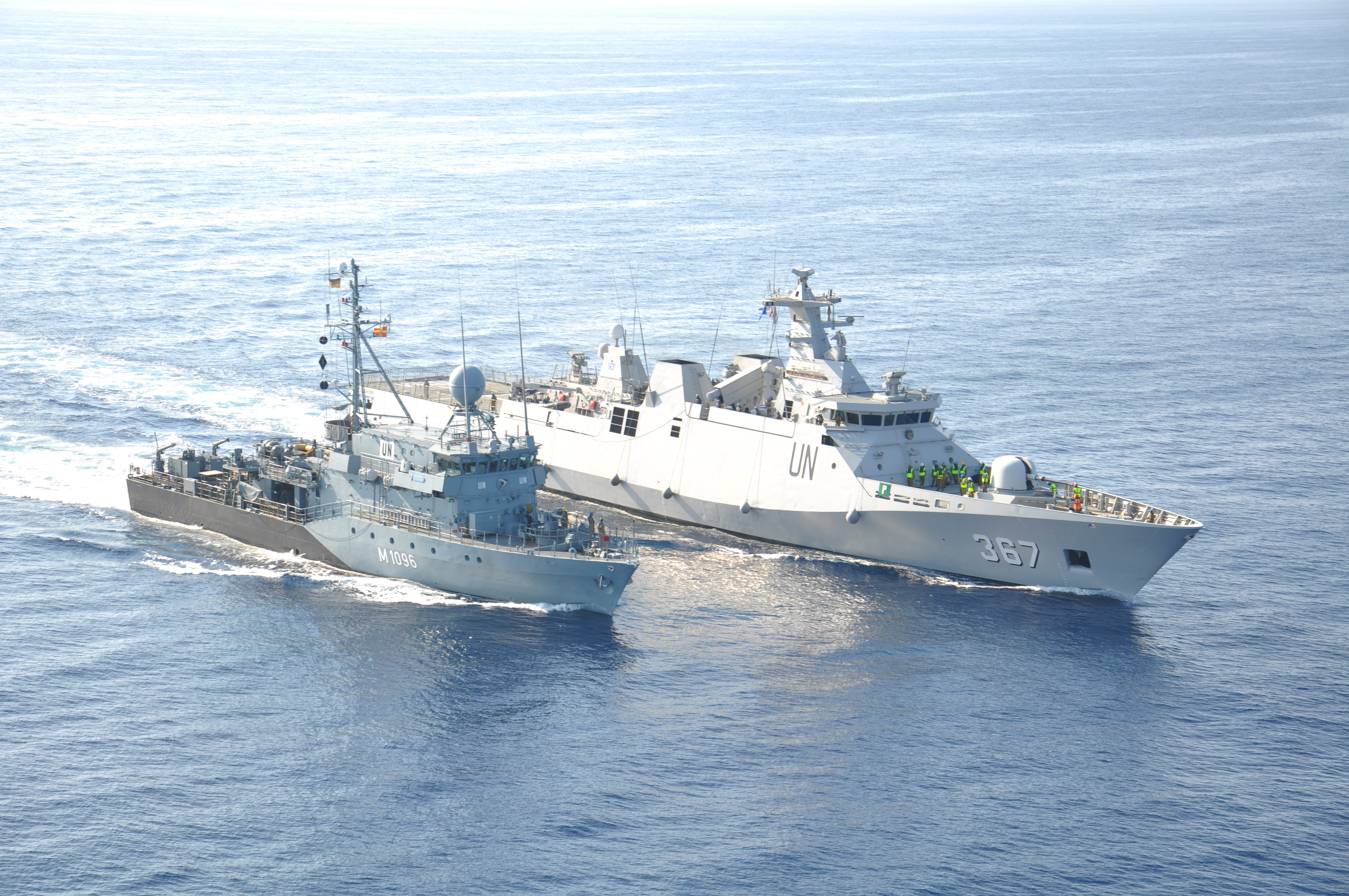
KRI Sultan Iskandar Muda and Passau during UNIFIL patrol in November 2011.

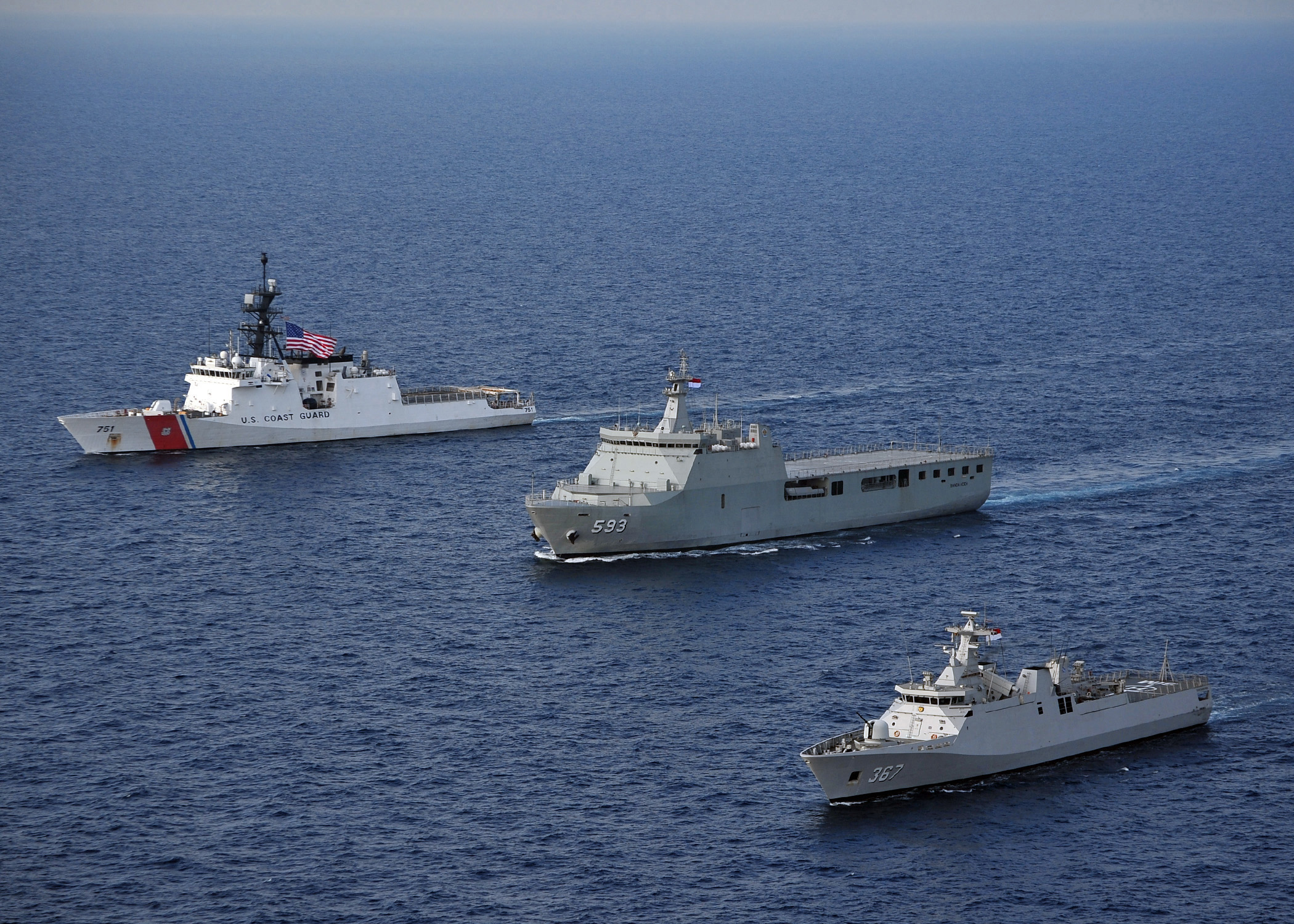
KRI Iskandar Muda, KRI Banda Aceh, and USCGC Waesche in Java Sea on 6 Jun 2012.

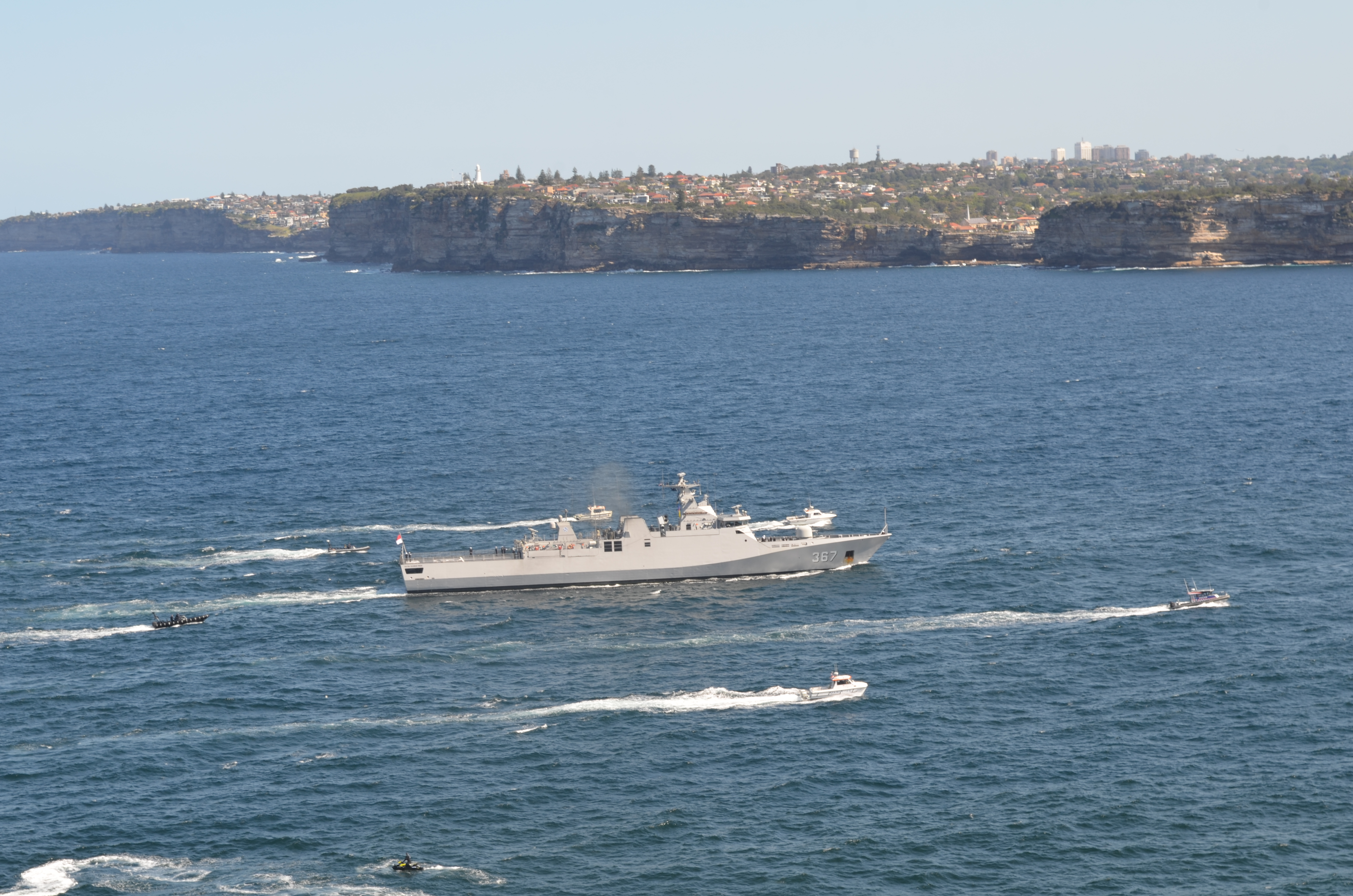
KRI Iskandar Muda in Sydney Harbour on 5 October 2013.

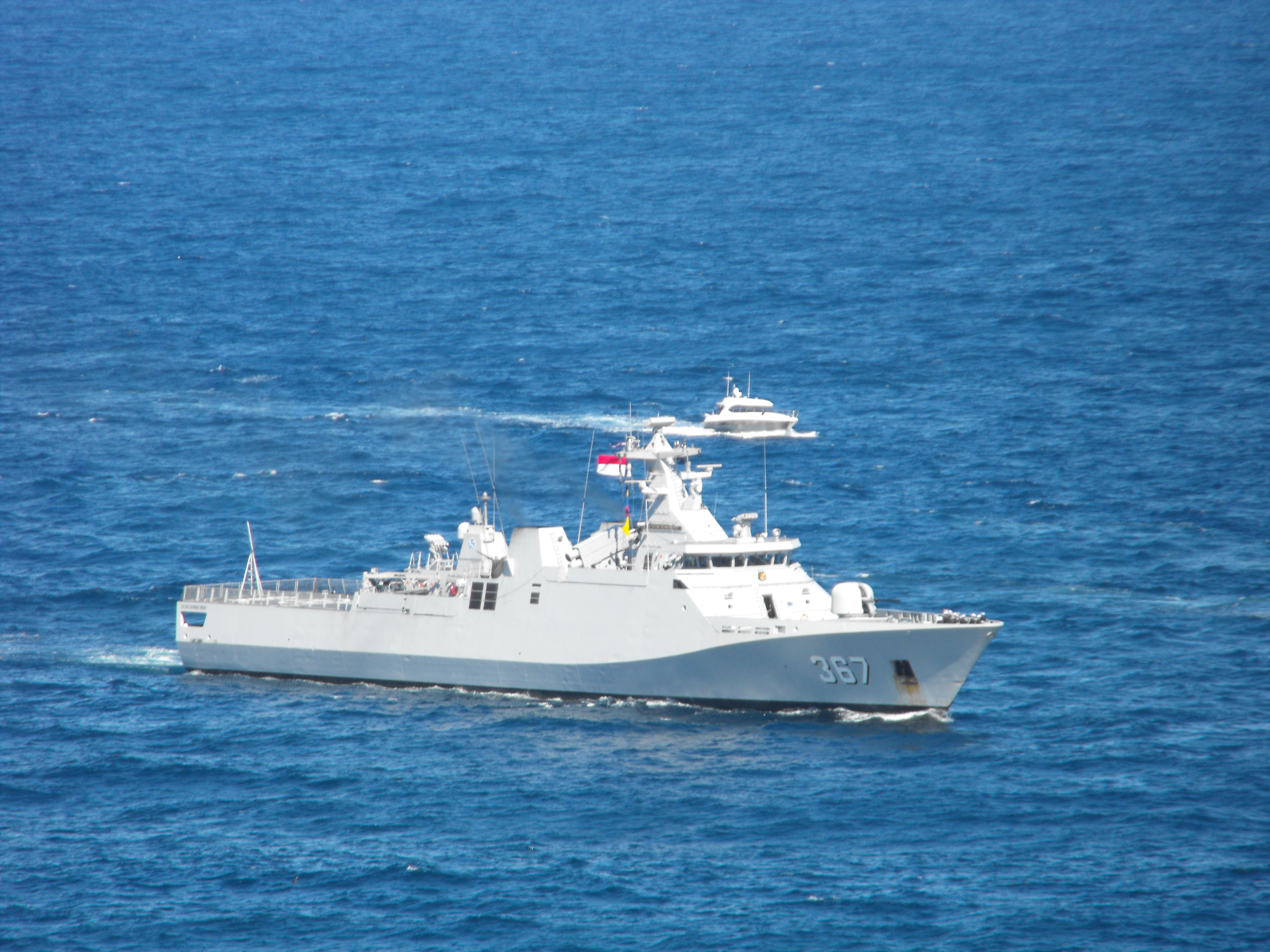
KRI Iskandar Muda in Sydney Harbour on 5 October 2013.

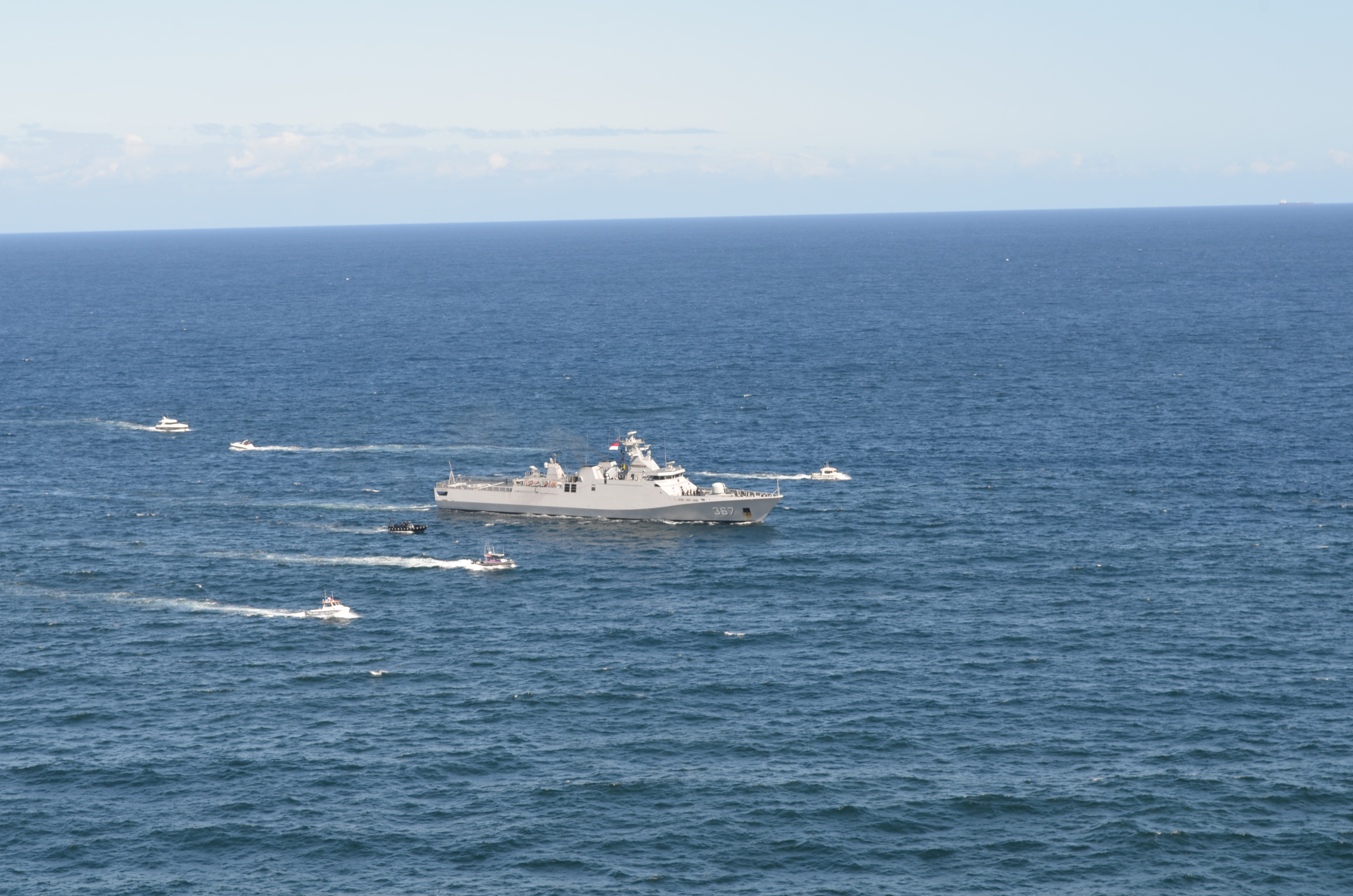
KRI Iskandar Muda in Sydney Harbour on 5 October 2013.

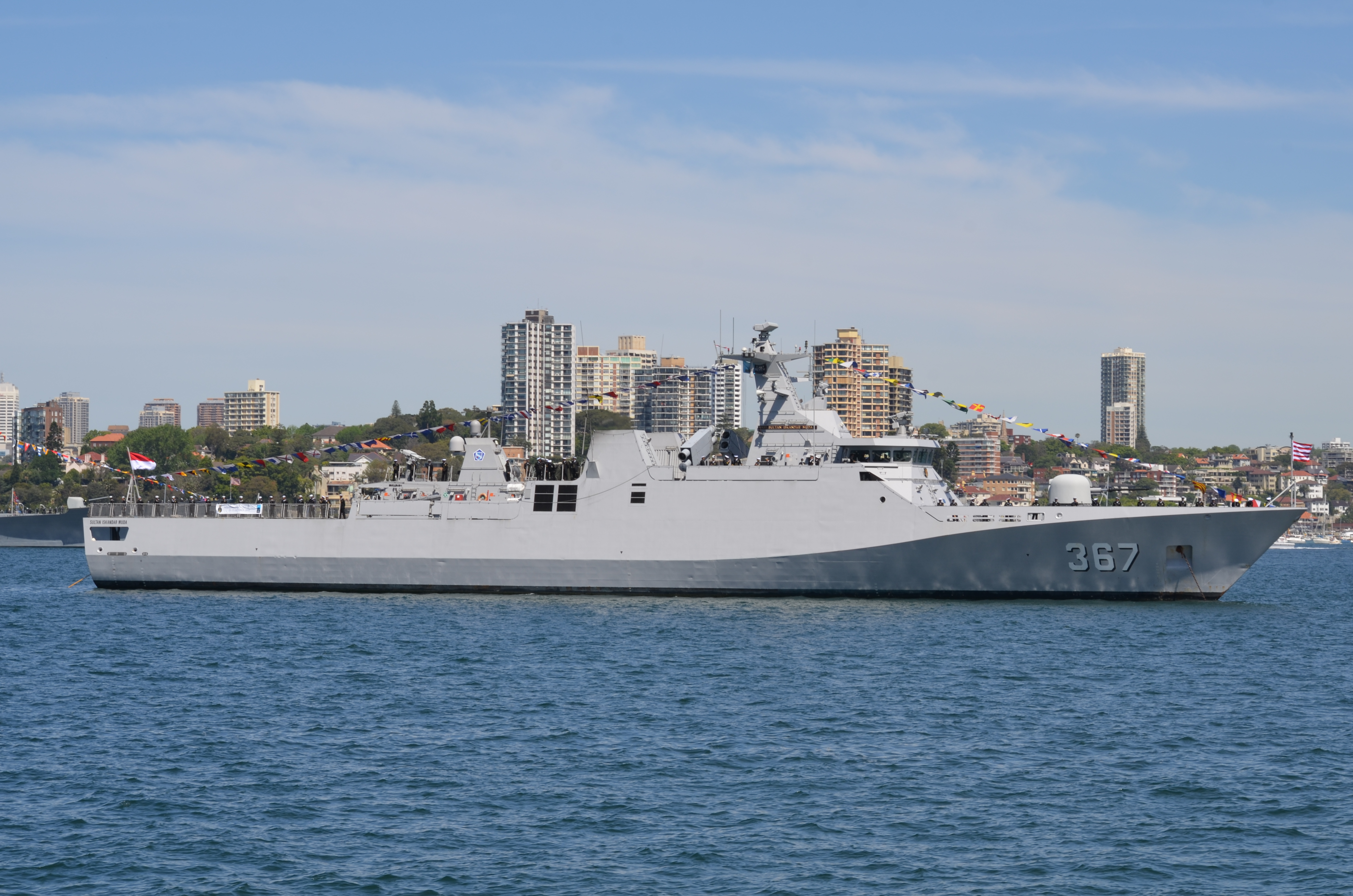
KRI Iskandar Muda in Sydney Harbour on 5 October 2013.

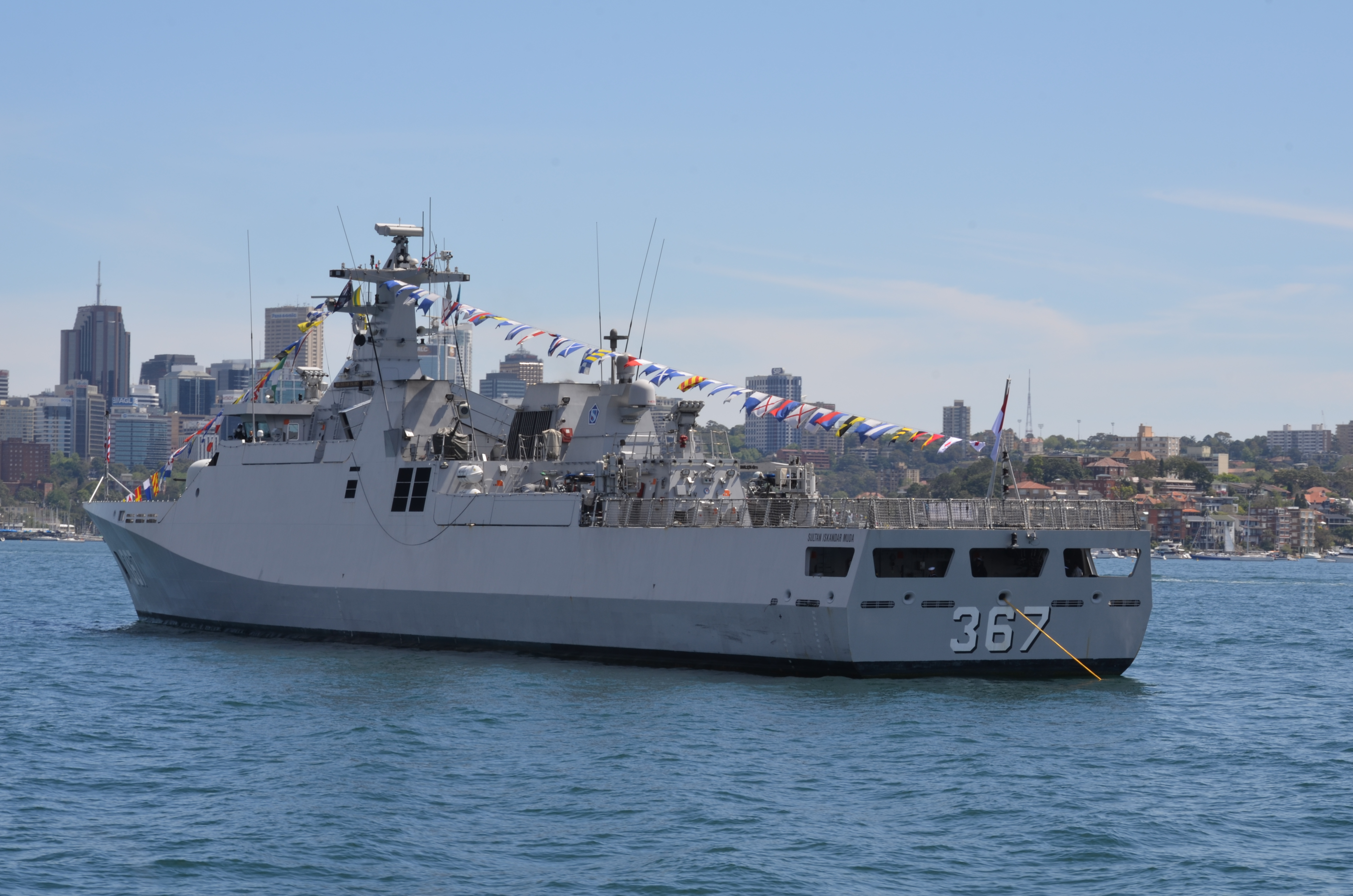
KRI Iskandar Muda in Sydney Harbour on 5 October 2013.

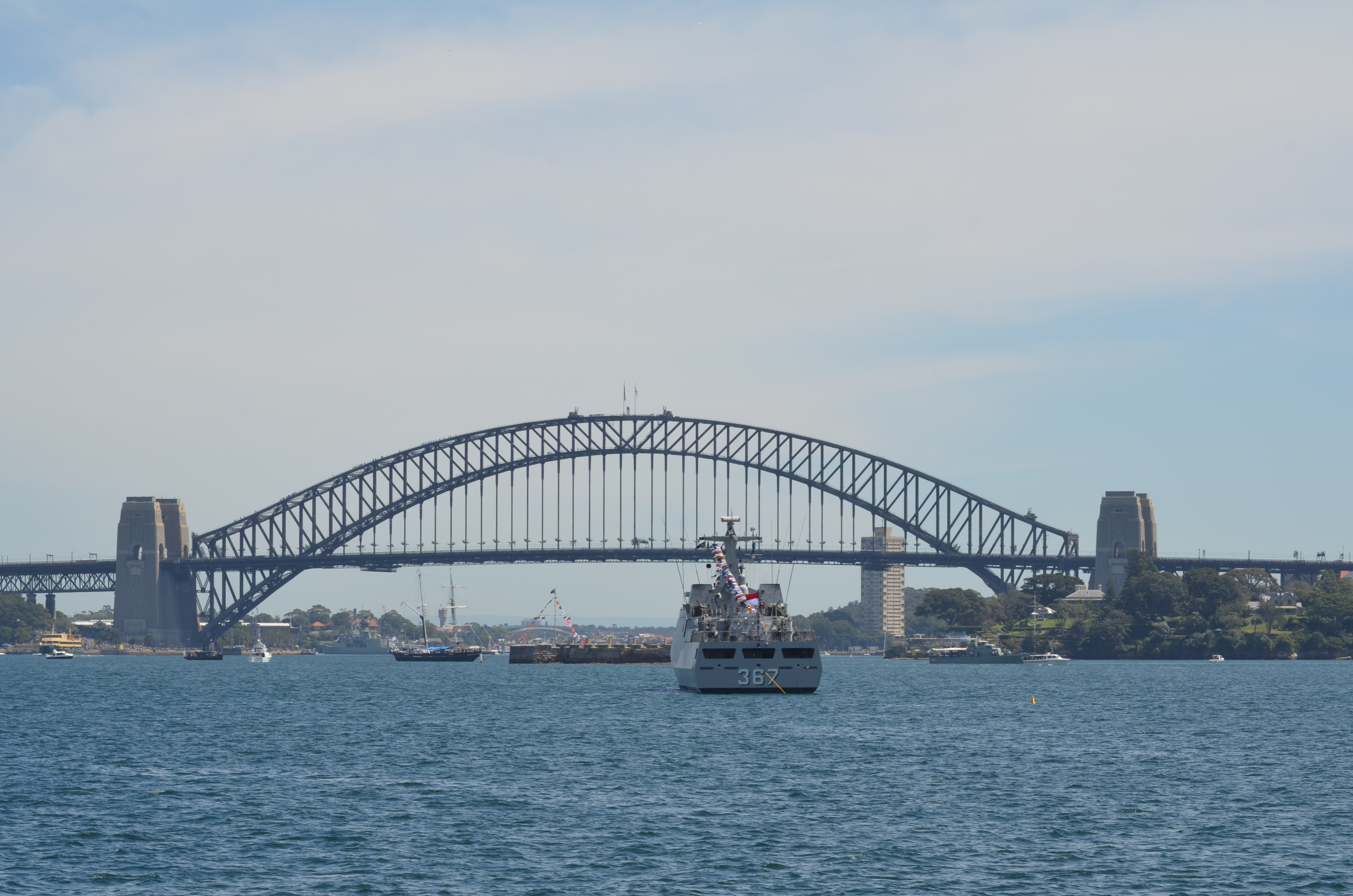
KRI Iskandar Muda in Sydney Harbour on 5 October 2013.
