= HNLMS Isaac Sweers (F814) =

Dutch-built frigate of the Indonesian Navy

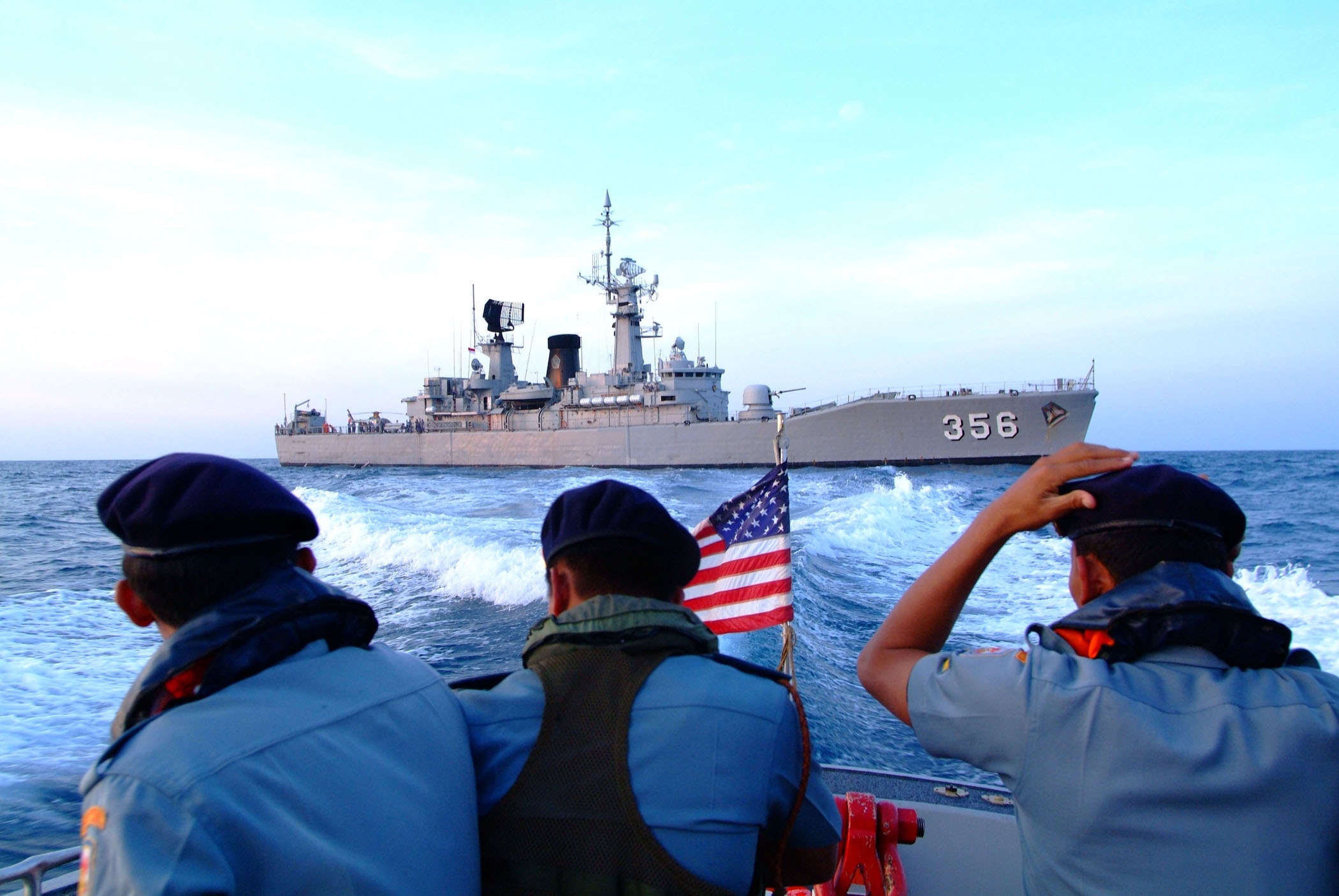
- KRI Karel Satsuitubun during CARAT 2005 exercise

History

Netherlands
- Name: Isaac Sweers
- Namesake: Isaac Sweers
- Builder: NDSM, Amsterdam
- Laid down: 5 May 1965
- Launched: 10 March 1967
- Commissioned: 15 May 1968
- Decommissioned: 1990
- Identification: Pennant number: F814; Code letters: PAVF
- Fate: Sold to the Indonesian Navy

Indonesia
- Name: Karel Satsuitubun
- Namesake: Karel Satsuit Tubun
- Acquired: 13 May 1989
- Commissioned: 1 November 1990
- Identification: MMSI number: 525114014; Callsign: PLHD; Pennant number: 356
- Status: In active service

General characteristics
- Class & type: Van Speijk class; Ahmad Yani class
- Displacement: 2,200 tons standard, 2,850 tons full load
- Length: 113.4 m (372 ft)
- Beam: 12.5 m (41 ft)
- Draught: 5.8 m (19 ft)
- Propulsion: As built; 2 x Babcock & Wilcox boilers; 2 x Werkspoor/English Electric steam turbines; 22,370 kW (30,000 shp); 2 x shafts; Rebuild; 2 x Caterpillar 3612 diesels; 9,200 kW (12,300 shp); 2 x shafts
- Speed: 28.5 kn (52.8 km/h; 32.8 mph); With new diesels - estimated max. 24 kn (44 km/h; 28 mph)
- Range: 4,500 nmi (8,300 km; 5,200 mi) at 12 kn (22 km/h; 14 mph)
- Complement: 180
- Sensors & processing systems: Radar: LW-03, DA-02, M45, M44; Sonar: Types 170B, 162; Combat system: SEWACO V
- Armament: as Karel Satsuitubun; 1 × OTO Melara 76 mm gun; 4 × 12.7 mm DShK HMGs; 2 × twin Simbad launcher for Mistral SAMs; 4 × C-802 SSM; 2 × 3 – Mk 32 anti submarine torpedo tubes
- Aircraft carried: one NBO-105C
- Aviation facilities: Hangar

HNLMS Isaac Sweers (F814) (Dutch: Hr.Ms. Isaac Sweers) is a frigate of the Van Speijk class. The ship was in service with the Royal Netherlands Navy from 1968 to 1990. The ship's radio call sign was "PAVF". She was sold to the Indonesian Navy where the ship was renamed KRI Karel Satsuitubun (356) and commissioned in November 1990.

== Design and construction ==
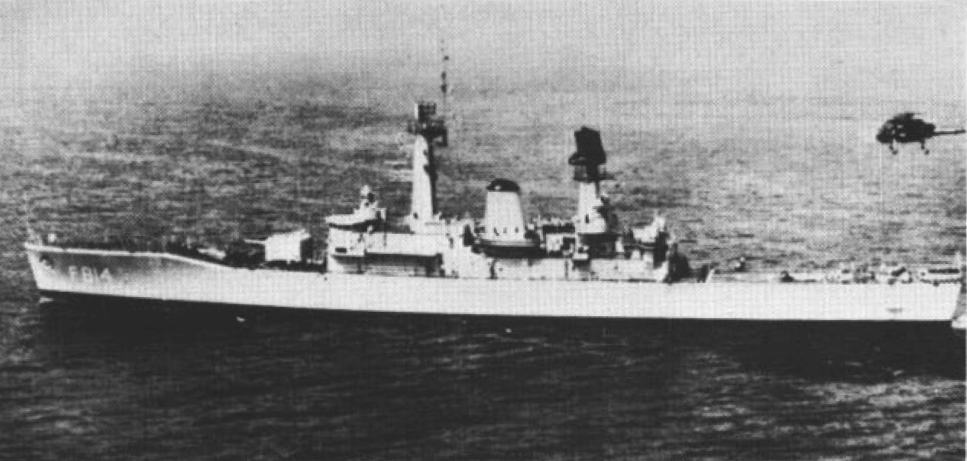
HNLMS Isaac Sweers c. 1969

In the early 1960s, the Royal Netherlands Navy had an urgent requirement to replace its Van Amstel-class frigates, obsolete ex-American escorts built during the Second World War. To meet this requirement, it chose to build a modified version of the British Leander-class frigate as its Van Speijk class, using broadly the same armament as the original design, but where possible, substituting Dutch electronics and radars.

The Van Speijks were 113.4 m (372 ft) long overall and 109.7 m (360 ft) between perpendiculars, with a beam of 12.5 m (41 ft) and a draught of 5.8 m (19 ft). Displacement was 2,200 long tons (2,200 t) standard and 2,850 long tons (2,900 t) full load. Two Babcock & Wilcox boilers supplied steam to two sets of Werkspoor-English Electric double reduction geared steam turbines rated at 30,000 shp (22,000 kW) and driving two propeller shafts. This gave a speed of 28.5 kn (32.8 mph; 52.8 km/h).

A twin 4.5-inch (113 mm) Mark 6 gun mount was fitted forward. Anti-aircraft defence was provided by two quadruple Sea Cat surface-to-air missile launchers on the hangar roof. A Limbo anti-submarine mortar was fitted aft to provide a short-range anti-submarine capability, while a hangar and helicopter deck allowed a single Westland Wasp helicopter to be operated, for longer range anti-submarine and anti-surface operations.

As built, Isaac Sweers was fitted with a Signaal LW-03 long range air search radar on the ship's mainmast, with a DA02 medium range air/surface surveillance radar carried on the ship's foremast. M44 and M45 fire control radars were provided for the Seacat missiles and the ship's guns respectively. The ship had a sonar suite of Type 170B attack sonar and Type 162 bottom search sonar. The ship had a crew of 251.

=== Modifications ===
All six Van Speijks were modernised in the 1970s, using many of the systems used by the new Kortenaer-class frigates. The 4.5-inch gun was replaced by a single OTO Melara 76 mm and launchers for up to eight Harpoon anti-ship missiles fitted (although only two were normally carried). The hangar and flight deck were enlarged, allowing a Westland Lynx helicopter to be carried, while the Limbo mortar was removed, with a pair of triple Mk 32 torpedo launchers providing close-in anti-submarine armament. A Signaal DA03 radar replaced the DA02 radar and an American EDO Corporation CWE-610 sonar replaced the original British sonar. Isaac Sweers was modernised at the Den Helder naval dockyard between 1 July 1980 and 28 October 1983. Isaac Sweers and Evertsen also received AN/SQR-18A towed array sonar system. The system was removed when the ships was sold to Indonesia.

== Dutch service history ==
The Royal Netherlands Navy placed an order for four Van Speijks in 1962, with two more, including Isaac Sweers, ordered in 1964. The ship was built at NDSM in Amsterdam. The keel laying took place on 5 May 1965 and the launching on 10 March 1967. The ship was put into service on 15 May 1968 with the pennant number F814.

In late 1972 she served as flagship for STANAVFORLANT.

In 1975 Isaac Sweers participated in the NATO exercise Ocean Safari.

The ship received a mid-life modernization in Den Helder, starting on 1 July 1980 and lasting till 28 October 1983. The completion of modernization was delayed by around eight months beyond the intended date due to lack of civilian labor in naval dockyards.

In 1986 she was present at the national Fleet days.

Isaac Sweers was decommissioned in 1990 and along with Evertsen were sold to Indonesia. She was transferred to the Indonesian Navy on 1 November 1990.

== Indonesian service history ==
On 13 May 1989, Indonesia and the Netherlands signed an agreement for transfer of the last two Van Speijk-class ships. The ship was transferred to Indonesia on 1 November 1990 and renamed as KRI Karel Satsuitubun, assigned with pennant number 356.

By 2002, the ship's Seacat missiles were inoperable and it was reported that propulsion problems were badly effecting the availability of the ships of this class. The ship's Seacat launchers were therefore replaced by two Simbad twin launchers for Mistral anti-aircraft missiles, and Karel Satsuitubun was re-engined with two 9.2 megawatts (12,300 shp) Caterpillar 3612 diesel engines. As the Indonesian Navy retired Harpoon missile from its stockpiles, Karel Satsuitubun was rearmed with Chinese C-802 missiles.

In December 2020, Indonesian Navy and Russian Navy conducted a joint naval exercise of Passex (Passing Exercise) Rusindo-20. The exercise took place in the Java Sea on Thursday, 17 December 2020. Indonesian Navy sent 3 ships (KRI Karel Satsuitubun, KRI Diponegoro, and KRI Tombak), while the Russian Navy sent 3 ships (Varyag, Admiral Panteleyev, and Pechenga). The exercise conducted several drills such as Maneuver Exercise, RAS approach, Flaghoist, Flashex, and Passing Exercise.

Karel Satsuitubun, along with Abdul Halim Perdanakusuma, Raden Eddy Martadinata, I Gusti Ngurah Rai, Fatahillah, Malahayati, Sultan Hasanuddin, Sultan Iskandar Muda, Sultan Nuku, dr. Wahidin Sudirohusodo, Surabaya, Teluk Banten, Tarakan and Bima Suci were deployed in waters off Nusa Dua, Bali to patrol the area during 2022 G20 Bali summit on 15–16 November 2022.
