= KRI Malahayati =

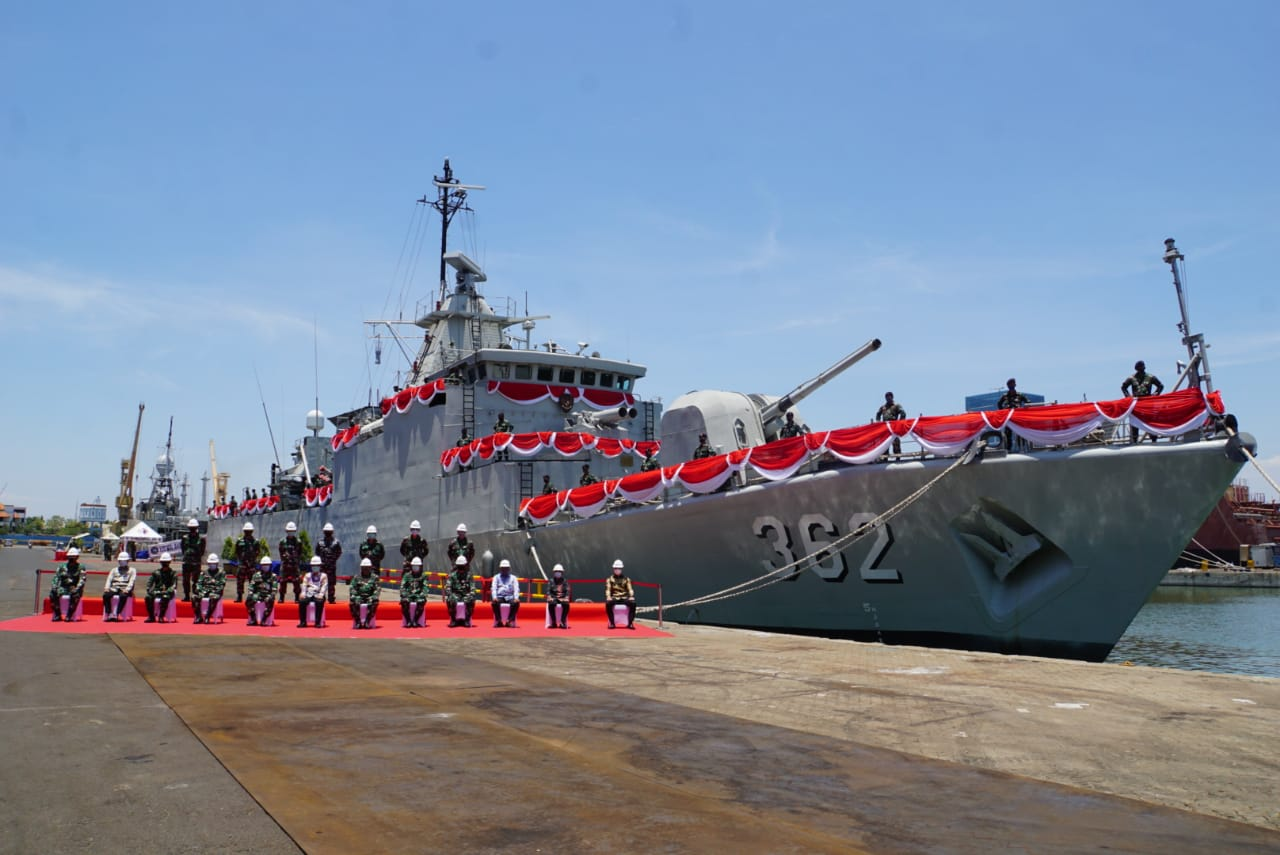
- KRI Malahayati after mid-life modernization, 2020

History

Indonesia
- Name: KRI Malahayati
- Namesake: Keumalahayati
- Builder: Wilton-Fijenoord, Schiedam, Netherlands
- Laid down: 28 July 1977
- Launched: 19 June 1978
- Commissioned: 21 March 1980
- Home port: Sorong
- Identification: MMSI number: 522114049; Callsign: YCSZ2; Pennant number: 362
- Status: In active service

General characteristics
- Class & type: Fatahillah-class corvette
- Displacement: 1,160 long tons (1,180 t) standard; 1,450 long tons (1,470 t) full load
- Length: 83.85 m (275 ft 1 in)
- Beam: 11.10 m (36 ft 5 in)
- Draught: 3.30 m (10 ft 10 in)
- Propulsion: Combined diesel or gas (CODOG), 2 shafts; 1 × Rolls-Royce Olympus TM-3B gas turbine, 16,670 kW (22,360 shp) or; 2 MTU 16V956 TB81 diesel engines, 8,000 bhp (6,000 kW); Replaced with Combined diesel and diesel (CODAD) after Mid-Life Upgrades
- Speed: 30 kn (56 km/h; 35 mph) (gas turbines); 21 kn (39 km/h; 24 mph) (diesels)
- Range: 4,250 nmi (7,870 km; 4,890 mi) at 16 kn (30 km/h; 18 mph)
- Complement: 82
- Sensors & processing systems: Search radar: Terma SCANTER 4603 X-band radar; Navigation radar: 1 × Sperry VisionMaster FT 340 S-band radar; 1 × Sperry Marine BridgeMaster E X-band radar; Fire control system: 1 × Navantia DORNA EO gun fire control system; Sonar: Signaal PHS-32 Hull-mounted Sonar; IFF system: Indra CIT 25D IFF system; ESM system: Indra RIGEL RESM system; Decoy & Countermeasure system: 2 × 8-barrelled Knebworth-Corvus countermeasures launchers; 1 × T-Mk 6 Fanfare towed sonar decoy; Combat management system: Navantia CATIZ Combat Management System; SATCOM: SkyTech BB110 Ku-band VSAT antenna
- Armament: 1 × Bofors 120 mm/46 TAK120 automatic gun; 1 × Bofors SAK40/L70-350 AFD 40 mm anti-aircraft gun; 2 × Rheinmetall Mk 20 Rh-202 20mm autocannon; 1 × Bofors SR375A 375 mm twin tube anti-submarine rocket launcher; 2 × Mk 32 triple torpedo launcher for Mark 46 or WASS A244-S lightweight torpedo
- Notes: The Mid-Life Modernization programs include replacing the ship propulsion from CODOG to CODAD, also the removal of Signaal DA05 radar and MM38 Exocet missile

KRI Malahayati (362) is an Indonesian Navy ship named after Malahayati, a national war hero from Aceh. The ship is a missile-equipped corvette, the second ship of the Fatahillah class.

== Design ==
Malahayati has a length of 83.85 m (275.1 ft), a beam of 11.10 m (36.4 ft), a draught of 3.3 m (11 ft) and displacement of 1,160 long tons (1,180 t) standard and 1,450 long tons (1,470 t) at full load. The ship has two shafts and was powered with CODOG-type propulsion, which were consisted of one Rolls-Royce Olympus TM-3B gas turbine with 21,000 kW (28,000 shp) and two MTU 16V956 TB81 diesel engines with 6,000 bhp (4,500 kW). The ship has a top speed of 30 knots (56 km/h). Malahayati has a complement of 89 personnel, including 11 officers.

The ship are armed with one Bofors 120 mm Automatic Gun L/46, one Bofors 40 mm Automatic Gun L/70 and two Rheinmetall Mk 20 Rh-202 autocannons. For anti-submarine warfare, the ship are equipped with one Bofors 375 mm twin anti-submarine rocket launcher and two triple Mk 32 324 mm torpedo launchers. For surface warfare, Malahayati was equipped with four Exocet MM 38 anti-ship missile launchers. Due to obsolescence, the ship never carried the missiles since early 2000s.

=== Mid-life upgrade ===
The mid-life upgrade of KRI Malahayati was awarded to a consortium consisting of Navantia and Indra in 2016. The scope of the upgrade includes the installation of Indra's Rigel ESM system, Navantia DORNA Fire Control System and Navantia CATIZ Combat Management System.

In October 2020, PT. PAL finished KRI Malahayati Mid-Life Modernization works and proceed to hand over the ship to Indonesian navy.

== Service history ==
Malahayati was laid down on 28 July 1977 at Wilton-Fijenoord, Schiedam, Netherlands. The ship was launched on 19 June 1978 and was commissioned on 21 March 1980.

The ship, along with Fatahillah, Sultan Nuku, Sultan Hasanuddin, Sultan Iskandar Muda, Raden Eddy Martadinata, I Gusti Ngurah Rai, Abdul Halim Perdanakusuma, Karel Satsuitubun, dr. Wahidin Sudirohusodo, Surabaya, Teluk Banten, Tarakan and Bima Suci were deployed in waters off Nusa Dua, Bali to patrol the area during 2022 G20 Bali summit on 15–16 November 2022.
