= EID, S.A. =

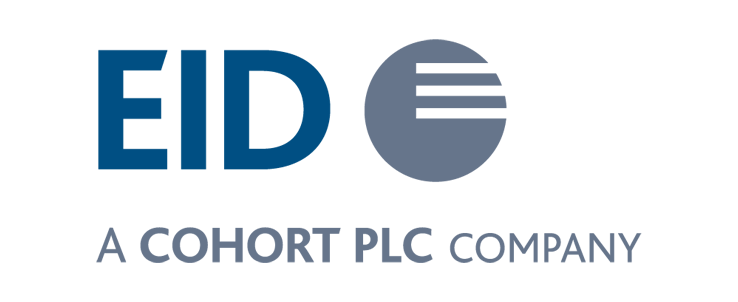
- Company type: Private company
- Industry: Telecommunications, Electronics, Defense
- Founded: 1983; 43 years ago
- Headquarters: Lazarim, Portugal
- Website: www.eid.pt

EID, S.A. (Empresa de Investigação e Desenvolvimento de Electrónica, S.A.) is a Portuguese research and development company, established in 1983. The company is specialized in the fields of electronics, communications and command and control, mainly for Defence use.

EID is a private owned company. Its shareholder structure is composed by Cohort Plc (80%), idD Portugal Defence (18%) and IAPMEI (2%).

The company makes military communications systems, including its ICCS (Integrated Communications Control System) that is the responsible for the integration and management of all the communications on board a warship, intercom systems for all types of armoured vehicles, field digital switchboards and telephony equipment, etc., besides the design, supply and deployment of large scale turnkey systems at National scales.

EID's Customers include a number of armed forces in Europe, Africa, South America, Middle East and Asia Pacific.

The activities of EID are divided by the following lines of business: naval communications, tactical communications, military messaging and systems integration.

In 2012 EID already supplied more than 500 field switchboards and more than 7000 telephone sets to different customers.

== Customers ==
Nowadays EID’s naval communications systems equip more than 160 warships from 19 Navies around the world.

- Algeria: Algerian National Navy
- Angola
- Australia: Royal Australian Navy
- Austria
- Bahrain: Royal Bahraini Army
- Bangladesh: Bangladesh Army
- Belgium: Belgian Navy
- Brazil: Brazilian Navy and Brazilian Army
- Cape Verde: Cape Verdean Armed Forces (Probably donated by the Portuguese Armed Forces)
- Denmark
- Egypt: Egyptian Army
- France
- Germany
- Greece
- Guinea-Bissau: Armed Forces of Guinea-Bissau (Probably donated by the Portuguese Armed Forces)
- Indonesia: Indonesian Navy
- Italy: Armed forces of Italy
- Lithuania
- Malaysia: Malaysian Army and Royal Malaysian Navy
- Mozambique: Armed forces of Mozambique (Probably donated by the Portuguese Armed Forces)
- Netherlands: Royal Netherlands Navy
- Philippines: Armed Forces of the Philippines
- Poland: Polish Navy
- Portugal: Portuguese Army, Portuguese Navy and Portuguese Air Force.
- São Tomé and Príncipe: Armed Forces of São Tomé and Príncipe (Probably donated by the Portuguese Armed Forces)
- Saudi Arabia: Armed Forces of Saudi Arabia
- Spain: Spanish Navy
- Timor-Leste: Timor Leste Defence Force (Probably donated by the Portuguese Armed Forces)
- United Arab Emirates: United Arab Emirates Army
- United Kingdom: Royal Navy
- United States: United States Navy
- Uruguay
