= KRI Bima Suci =

Barque of the Indonesian Navy

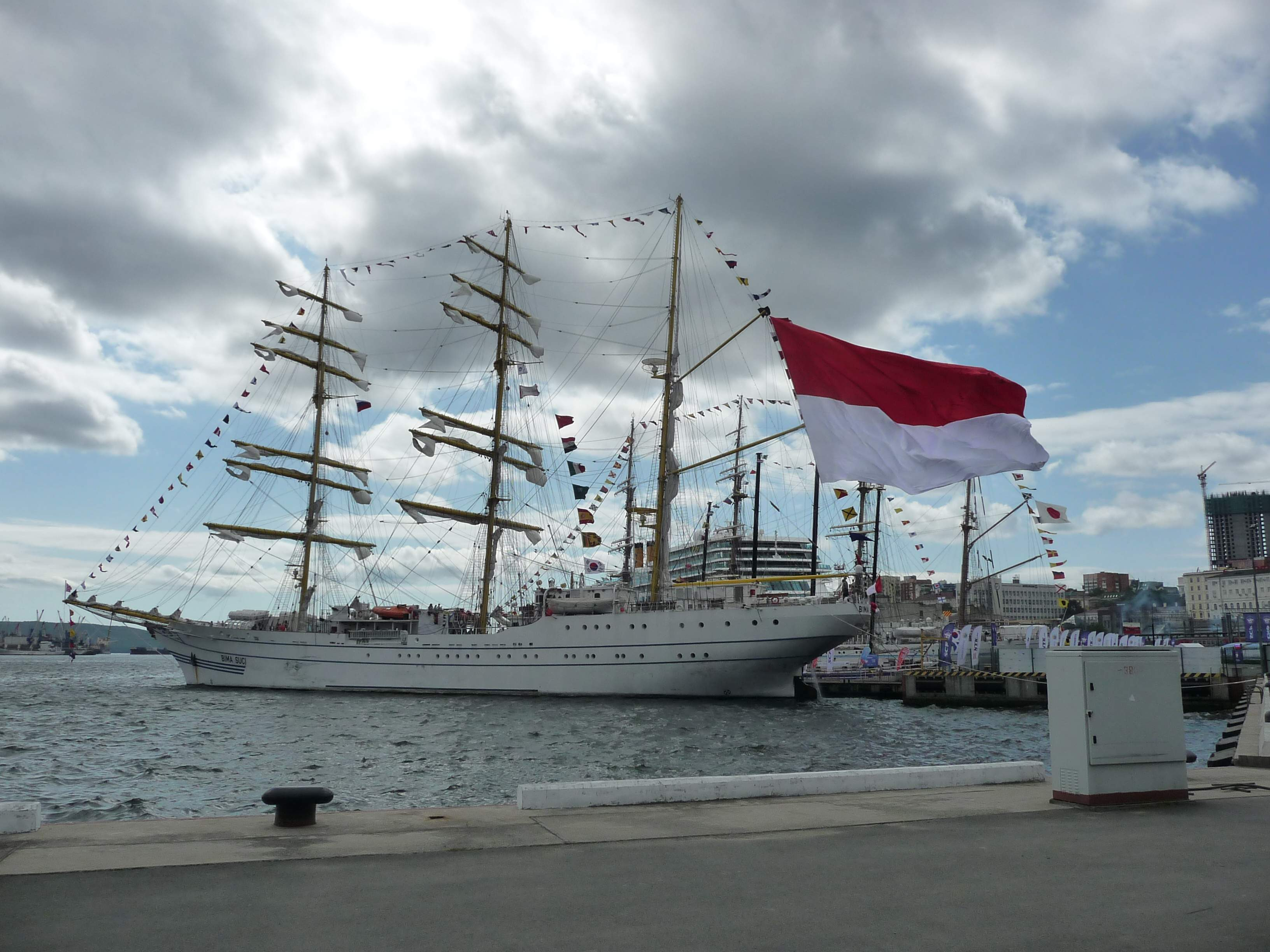
- KRI Bima Suci in Vladivostok on 12 September 2018

History

Indonesia
- Name: Bima Suci
- Builder: Freire Shipyard, Vigo
- Laid down: 2016
- Launched: 18 September 2017
- Commissioned: 2017
- Home port: Surabaya
- Identification: IMO number: 9792319; MMSI number: 9792319; Callsign: YBIE2; Pennant number: 945
- Status: Active

General characteristics
- Type: Barque
- Length: 364.8 ft (111 m)
- Beam: 10 m (32.8 ft)
- Draft: 19.5 ft (5.9 m)
- Speed: 12 knots (22 km/h; 14 mph) engine; 12 knots (22 km/h; 14 mph) sail
- Complement: 120 crew
- Crew: 118

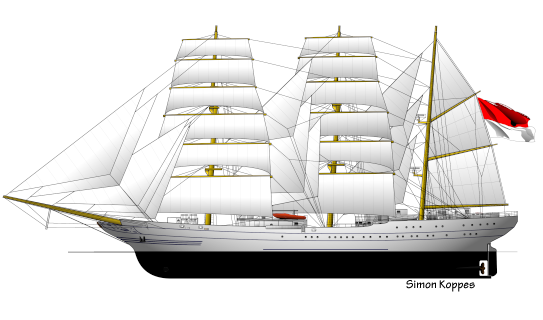
Drawing of the Indonesian sailing ship KRI Bima Suci

KRI Bima Suci (945) is a barque and training ship of the Indonesian Navy.

== Development and design ==
The technical design of this high mast sailing ship has a length of 111.20 meters, a width of 13.65 meters, a draft depth of 5.95 meters, and a maximum mast height of 49 meters from the upper deck surface. The three-masted Bark-class ship has 26 sails with a total sail area of 3,352 square meters. The main deck height is 9.20 meters above sea level.

KRI Bima Suci is planned to immediately carry out its first task of crossing operations by sailing from Spain to the country on 18 September. On its maiden voyage, KRI Bima Suci also carried out the 2017 Kartika Jala Krida (KJK) voyage, together with 119 cadets. KJK is a goodwill voyage abroad as well as training and practice (Latek) for AAL Cadets with using the training ship, and it is hoped that KRI Bima Suci will arrive in Surabaya on November 24, 2017.

== Construction and career ==
Bima Suci was launched on 18 September 2017 by Freire Shipyard, Vigo, Spain. The vessel was commissioned in 2017.

KRI Bima Suci was in Padang from 8 to 11 November, before leaving for Jakarta to be officially received in Indonesia. During this stopover in the West Sumatran capital, KRI Bima Suci and 119 AAL cadets who carried out the 2017 Kartika Jala Krida will carry out a series of activities, namely, Open Ship for the local community, City Carnival from the West Sumatra Governor's Office and ending at the Muara Peace Monument. On her maiden voyage, KRI Bima Suci commanded by Marine Lt. Col. (F) Widyatmoko Baruno Aji, and 119 AAL cadets/Cadets carried out Kartika Jala Krida (KJK) in 2017 commanded by Marine Lt. Col. (F) Tonny Sundah M. Tr. Han., has been through various countries with shipping routes, namely, Vigo (Spain) – Civitavecchia (Italy) – Port Said (Egypt) – Jeddah (Saudi Arabia) – Colombo (Sri Lanka) – and currently in Padang.
