= KRI Surabaya =

Makassar-class landing platform dock

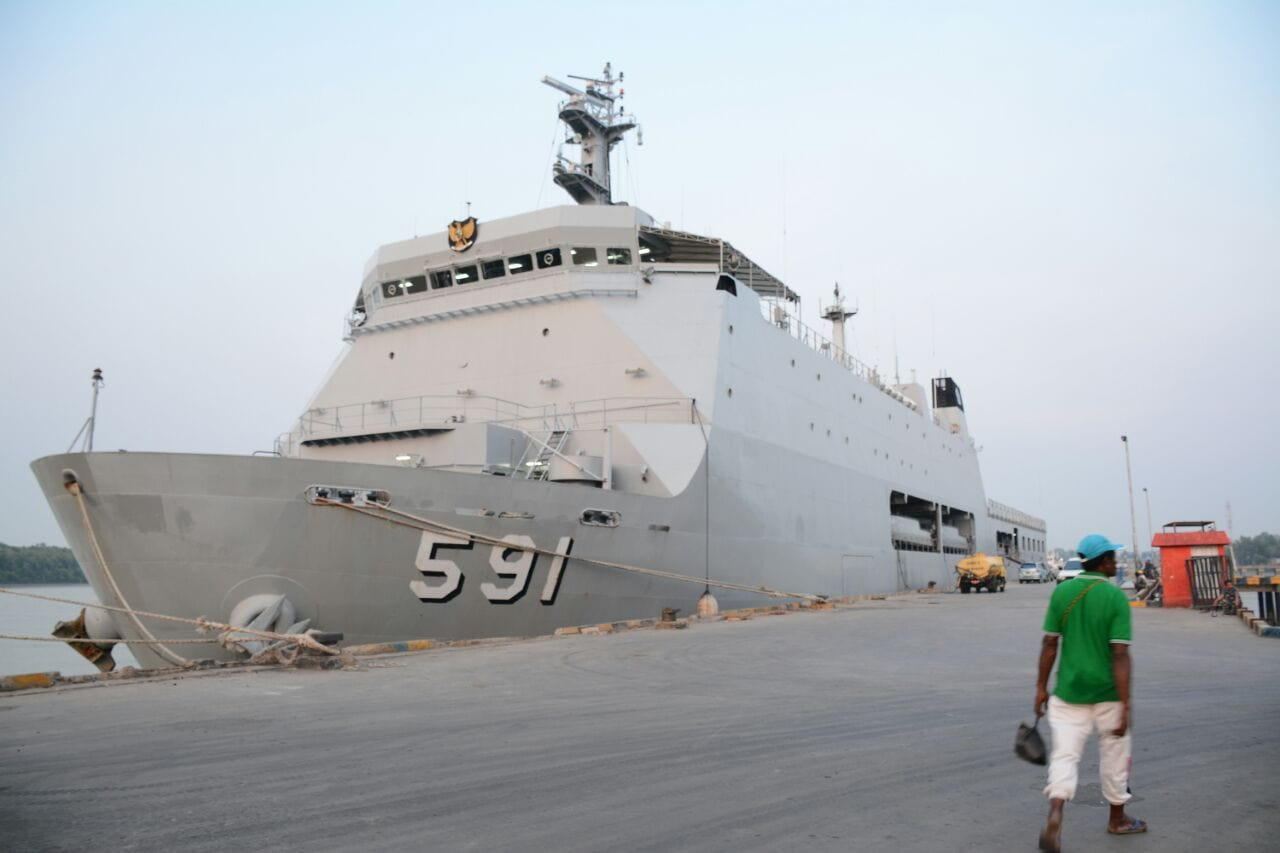
- KRI Surabaya at Makassar in 2017

History

Indonesia
- Name: Surabaya
- Namesake: Surabaya
- Ordered: December 2004
- Builder: DAESUN, Busan
- Laid down: 7 December 2006
- Launched: 23 March 2007
- Commissioned: 1 August 2007
- Identification: MMSI number: 525001013; Callsign: PLET; Pennant number: 591
- Status: Active

General characteristics
- Class & type: Makassar-class landing platform dock
- Tonnage: 12,400 tons
- Displacement: 11,300 tons standard displacement; 15,994 tons full displacement
- Length: 122 meters
- Beam: 22 meters
- Height: 56 meters
- Draft: 4.9 meters
- Decks: (Tank Deck); 6.7 meter,(Truck Deck); 11.3 meter
- Propulsion: CODAD, 2 shafts; 2 × MAN B&W 8L28/32A diesel rated at 2666 BHP/1960 kW@ 775 RPM
- Speed: Maximum: 16 knots; Cruising: 14 knots; Economy: 12 knots
- Range: 30 days, up to 10,000 Nm
- Endurance: +45 days
- Boats & landing craft carried: 2 x LCVP
- Capacity: up to 35 infantry vehicles
- Troops: 354 troops
- Complement: accommodations up to 507 persons
- Crew: 126 crew
- Armament: 1 x Leonardo OTO Twin 40L70 Compact (Stealth) 2 x 20mm Oerlikon 2 x Mistral Simbad
- Aircraft carried: Up to 5 helicopters
- Aviation facilities: 2 helideck spot (Medium-sized helicopters)

KRI Surabaya (591) is the second ship of the Makassar-class landing platform dock of the Indonesian Navy.

== Development and design ==
Indonesia signed a US$150 million contract in December 2004 and the first two units were built in Busan, South Korea. The remaining two were built at Indonesia's PT PAL shipyard in Surabaya with assistance from Daesun.The contract for the 3rd and 4th LPD to be built in Indonesia was signed with PT PAL on March 28, 2005.

On 19 October 2006, the first of the two Indonesian-built units, was laid down in a ceremony by Admiral Slamet Subiyanto, Chief of Staff of Indonesian Navy. The 3rd and 4th units had been designed to function as flagships with provisions for a command and control system, 57mm gun and air defence systems.

The 5th ship ordered by Indonesian Navy on 11 January 2017. First steel cutting ceremony for said ship was conducted on 28 April 2017. The ship's keel was laid on 28 August 2017.

== Construction and career ==
Surabaya was laid down 7 December 2006 and launched on 23 March 2007 by DSME at Busan. She was commissioned on 1 August 2007.

No less than 800 children from Banyuwangi, consisting of students and Scouts, youth organizations, and various representatives of community elements, joined the joysailing initiated by the Banyuwangi Navy Base on 8 December 2019.
