= Diponegoro-class corvette =

Corvette class of Indonesian Navy

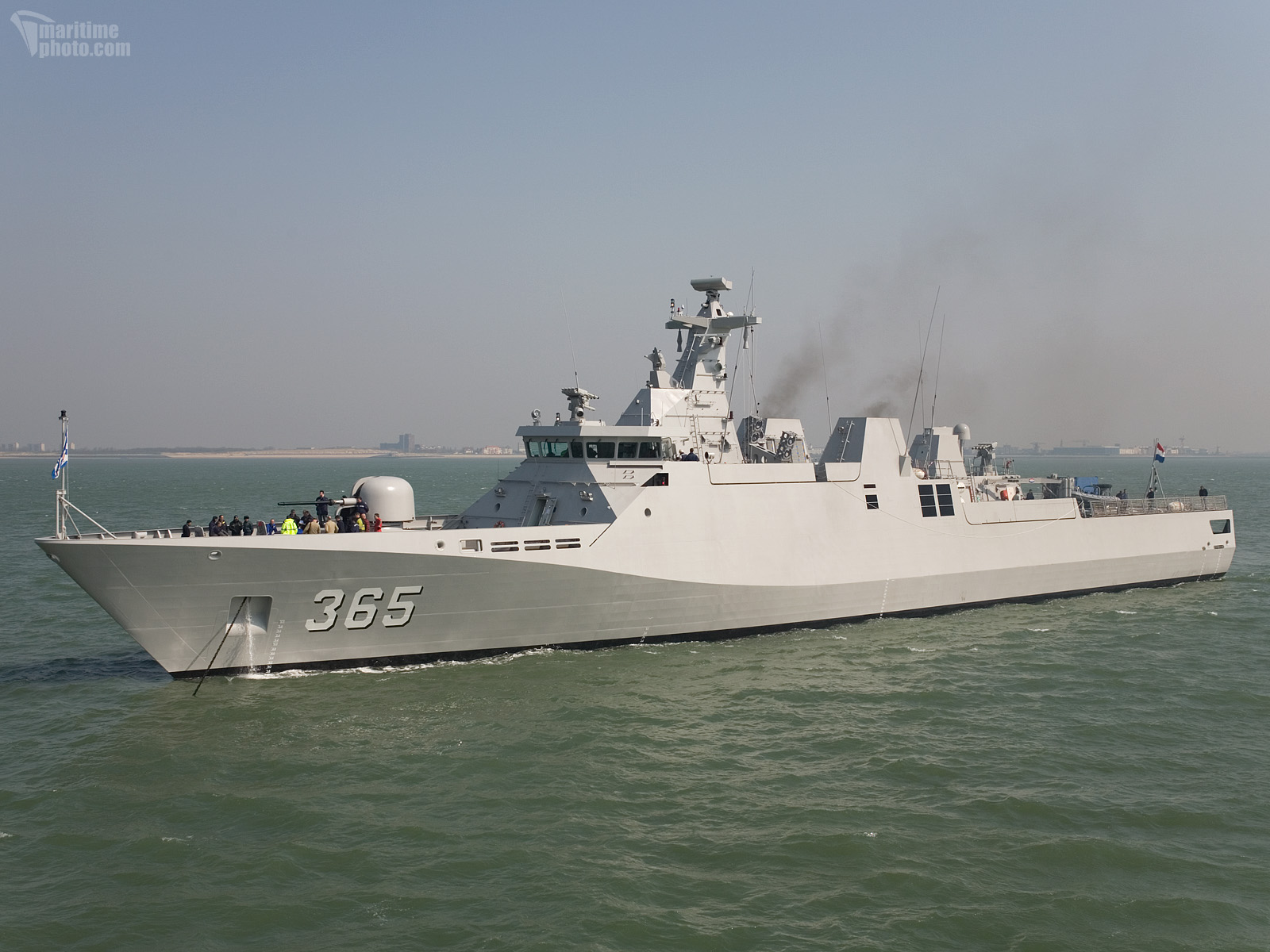
- KRI Diponegoro, lead ship of the class

Class overview
- Name: Diponegoro class
- Builders: Damen Schelde Naval Shipbuilding
- Operators: Indonesian Navy
- Preceded by: Fatahillah class; Dewantara class
- Succeeded by: Bung Tomo class
- Cost: $222 million
- Built: 2005–2008
- In commission: 2007–present
- Planned: 8
- Completed: 4
- Active: 4

General characteristics (Corvette 9113)
- Type: Multi-purpose corvette / frigate
- Displacement: 1,692 tons
- Length: 90.71 m (297 ft 7 in)
- Beam: 13.02 m (42 ft 9 in)
- Draft: 3.60 m (11 ft 10 in)
- Propulsion: 2 × SEMT Pielstick 20PA6B STC rated at 8910 kW each driving a lightweight Geislinger coupling combination BE 72/20/125N + BF 110/50/2H (steel – composite coupling combination); 4 × Caterpillar 3406C TA generator rated at 350 kW each; 1 × Caterpillar 3304B emergency generator rated at 105 kW; 2 × shaft with Rolls-Royce Kamewa 5 bladed controllable pitch propeller; 2 × Renk ASL94 single step reduction gear with passive roll stabilization
- Speed: Maximum: 28 knots (52 km/h; 32 mph); Cruising: 18 knots (33 km/h; 21 mph); Economy: 14 knots (26 km/h; 16 mph)
- Range: Cruising speed at 18 kn (33 km/h; 21 mph): 3,600 nmi (6,700 km; 4,100 mi); Economy speed at 14 kn (26 km/h; 16 mph): 4,800 nmi (8,900 km; 5,500 mi)
- Complement: 20, up to 80
- Sensors & processing systems: Combat System: Thales Group TACTICOS with 4 x Multifunction Operator Console Mk 3 2H; Search radar: MW08 3D multibeam surveillance radar; IFF: Thales TSB 2525 Mk XA (integrated with MW08); Navigation radar: Sperry Marine BridgeMasterE ARPA radar; Fire control radar: LIROD Mk 2 tracking radar; Data Link: LINK Y Mk 2 datalink system; Sonar: Thales UMS 4132 Kingklip medium frequency active/passive ASW hull mounted sonar; Internal Communications: Thales Communication's Fibre Optical COmmunications Network (FOCON) or EID's ICCS where on-board users have access to internal and/or external communication channels and integrated remote control of communications equipment; Satellite Comms: Nera F series; Navigation System: Raytheon Anschutz integrated navigation; Integrated Platform Management System: Imtech UniMACs 3000 Integrated Bridge System
- Electronic warfare & decoys: ESM: Thales VIGILE 100; ECM: Racal Scorpion 2L; Decoy: TERMA SKWS, DLT-12T 130mm decoy launchers, port, starboard
- Armament: Guns: 1 × Oto Melara 76 mm gun (A position) 2 × 20 mm Denel GI-2 gun (B position); Missiles: 2 × quad (8) Mistral TETRAL Anti-air missile, forward & aft 4 × Exocet MM40 Block III anti-surface vessel missile; Torpedoes: 2 × triple launchers for WASS A244-S mod.3
- Aviation facilities: Landing pad, optional hangar

The Diponegoro class of guided-missile corvettes of the Indonesian Navy are SIGMA 9113 types of the Netherlands-designed Sigma family of modular naval vessels, named after Indonesian Prince Diponegoro. Currently there are four Diponegoro-class corvette in service.

== History ==
The Indonesian variant is based on the Sigma 9113 design. Work on the first of the class, KRI Diponegoro, began with the first steel cutting conducted in October 2004. The ship was christened on 16 September 2006 and commissioned on 2 July 2007 by Admiral Slamet Soebijanto, Indonesian Navy Chief of Staff.

Options for two other units were exercised in January 2006 with the first steel cut commenced on 3 April 2006 in Damen's Schelde Naval Shipbuilding yard, Vlissingen-Oost yard and not in Surabaya stated earlier.

On 28 August 2007, Jane's Missiles and Rockets reported that Indonesia was having problems securing the export license for the MM-40 Exocet block II and are considering Chinese made C-802 anti-ship missiles as alternatives. However, the ships have already been delivered with the Exocet missiles. In 2019 MM40 Exocet Block III were launched from KRI Sultan Iskandar Muda (367).

== Modernisation ==
In early November 2022, PT Len and Thales Nederland has signed a contract to undertake the refurbishment of the integrated mission systems for all four Diponegoro-class ships. These ships will soon be refurbished with an Integrated Missions System including the TACTICOS Baseline 2 Combat Management System, the Naval Smarter (NS) 50 radar, as well as the latest in software-driven radar technology able to combat the highest level of threats.

In September 2026 it was reported that Nevesbu has presented its concept design for the refurbishment of the Diponegoro class corvettes.

== Ships of class ==
Indonesian Navy / Sigma 9113 design

Name	Pennant	Laid down	Launched	Commissioned	Notes
KRI Diponegoro	365	24 March 2005	16 September 2006	5 July 2007	Diponegoro, a National Hero from Central Java
KRI Sultan Hasanuddin	366	24 March 2005	16 September 2006	24 November 2007	Sultan Hasanuddin, a National Hero from South Sulawesi
KRI Sultan Iskandar Muda	367	8 May 2006	24 November 2007	18 October 2008	Iskandar Muda, a National Hero from Aceh
KRI Frans Kaisiepo	368	8 May 2006	28 June 2008	7 March 2009	Frans Kaisiepo, a National Hero from Papua and the fourth Governor of Papua

== See also ==
- List of corvette classes in service

Equivalent modern corvettes

- Braunschweig-class – (Germany)
- Steregushchiy-class – (Russia)
- Kamorta-class – (India)
- Ada-class – (Turkey)
- Sa'ar 6-class – (Israel)
- Pohjanmaa-class – (Finland)
