= KRI Diponegoro (365) =

Diponegoro-class corvette of the Indonesian Navy

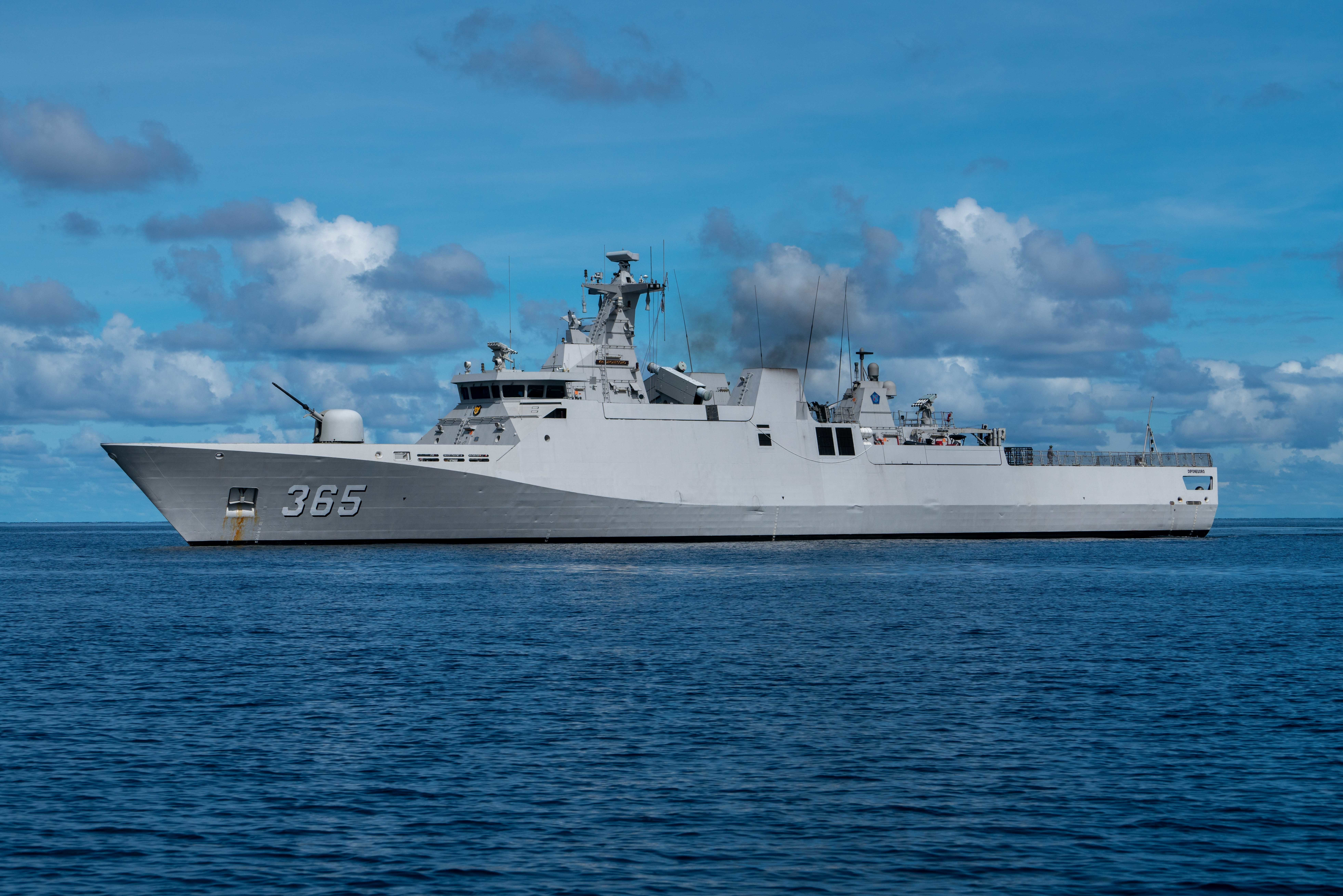
- KRI Diponegoro during CARAT Indonesia, 9 November 2021

History

Indonesia
- Name: Diponegoro
- Namesake: Diponegoro
- Builder: Damen Group, Vlissingen
- Laid down: 24 March 2005
- Launched: 16 September 2006
- Commissioned: 5 July 2007
- Identification: IMO number: 9334052; MMSI number: 525014039; Callsign: PLHA; Pennant number: 365
- Status: Active

General characteristics (Corvette 9113)
- Type: Diponegoro-class corvette
- Displacement: 1,692 tons
- Length: 90.71 m (297 ft 7 in)
- Beam: 13.02 m (42 ft 9 in)
- Draft: 3.60 m (11 ft 10 in)
- Propulsion: 2 × SEMT Pielstick 20PA6B STC rated at 8910 kW each driving a lightweight Geislinger coupling combination BE 72/20/125N + BF 110/50/2H (steel – composite coupling combination); 4 × Caterpillar 3406C TA generator rated at 350 kW each; 1 × Caterpillar 3304B emergency generator rated at 105 kW; 2 × shaft with Rolls-Royce Kamewa 5 bladed controllable pitch propeller; 2 × Renk ASL94 single step reduction gear with passive roll stabilization
- Speed: Maximum: 28 knots (52 km/h; 32 mph); Cruising: 18 knots (33 km/h; 21 mph); Economy: 14 knots (26 km/h; 16 mph)
- Range: Cruising speed at 18 kn (33 km/h; 21 mph): 3,600 nmi (6,700 km; 4,100 mi); Economy speed at 14 kn (26 km/h; 16 mph): 4,800 nmi (8,900 km; 5,500 mi)
- Complement: 20-80 crew
- Sensors & processing systems: Combat System: Thales Group TACTICOS with 4 x Multifunction Operator Console Mk 3 2H; Search radar: MW08 3D multibeam surveillance radar; IFF: Thales TSB 2525 Mk XA (integrated with MW08); Navigation radar: Sperry Marine BridgeMasterE ARPA radar; Fire control radar: LIROD Mk 2 tracking radar; Data Link: LINK Y Mk 2 datalink system; Sonar: Thales UMS 4132 Kingklip medium frequency active/passive ASW hull mounted sonar; Internal Communications: Thales Communication's Fibre Optical COmmunications Network (FOCON) or EID's ICCS where on-board users have access to internal and/or external communication channels and integrated remote control of communications equipment; Satellite Comms: Nera F series; Navigation System: Raytheon Anschutz integrated navigation; Integrated Platform Management System: Imtech UniMACs 3000 Integrated Bridge System
- Electronic warfare & decoys: ESM: Thales DR3000; ECM: Racal Scorpion 2L; Decoy: TERMA SKWS, DLT-12T 130mm decoy launchers, port, starboard
- Armament: Guns: 1 × Oto Melara 76 mm gun (A position) 2 × 20 mm Denel GI-2 gun (B position); Missiles: 2 × quad (8) Mistral TETRAL Anti-air missile, forward & aft 4 × Exocet MM40 Block III anti-surface vessel missile; Torpedoes: 2 × triple launchers for 3A 244S Mode II/EuroTorp MU 90 torpedoes
- Aviation facilities: Helipad

KRI Diponegoro (365) is the lead ship of the Diponegoro-class corvette of the Indonesian Navy.

== Development ==
The Diponegoro-class guided-missile corvettes of the Indonesian Navy are SIGMA 9113 types of the Netherlands-designed Sigma family of modular naval vessels, named after Indonesian Prince Diponegoro. Currently there are 4 Diponegoro-class corvette in service.

== Construction and career ==
Diponegoro was laid down on 24 March 2005 and launched on 16 September 2006 by Damen Group, Vlissingen. She was commissioned on 5 July 2007 by Admiral Slamet Soebijanto, Indonesian Navy Chief of Staff.

Since its first participation in 2009, Diponegoro has taken part in the Maritime Task Force of the United Nations Interim Force in Lebanon several times.

On 28 June 2016, KRI Diponegoro arrived at Joint Base Pearl Harbor-Hickam for RIMPAC 2016 from 30 June to 4 August 2016.

On 21 April 2021, immediately after the disappearance of KRI Nanggala, the navy deployed KRI Diponegoro, KRI Raden Eddy Martadinata, and KRI I Gusti Ngurah Rai to search for the missing submarine.

In November 2021, she and KRI I Gusti Ngurai Rai participated with US Pacific Fleet for the joint exercise CARAT Indonesia 2021.

On 1 November 2022, KRI Diponegoro arrived at Funakoshi Quay, Yokosuka, Japan to participate in the 2022 International Fleet Review (IFR) from 1 to 8 November 2022.

On 4 February 2025, the Diponegoro arrived at the Port of Colombo, Sri Lanka, for an official visit under the command of Commander Wirastyo Haprabu. The vessel departed the island following the conclusion of the visit on 5 February 2025.

== Gallery ==
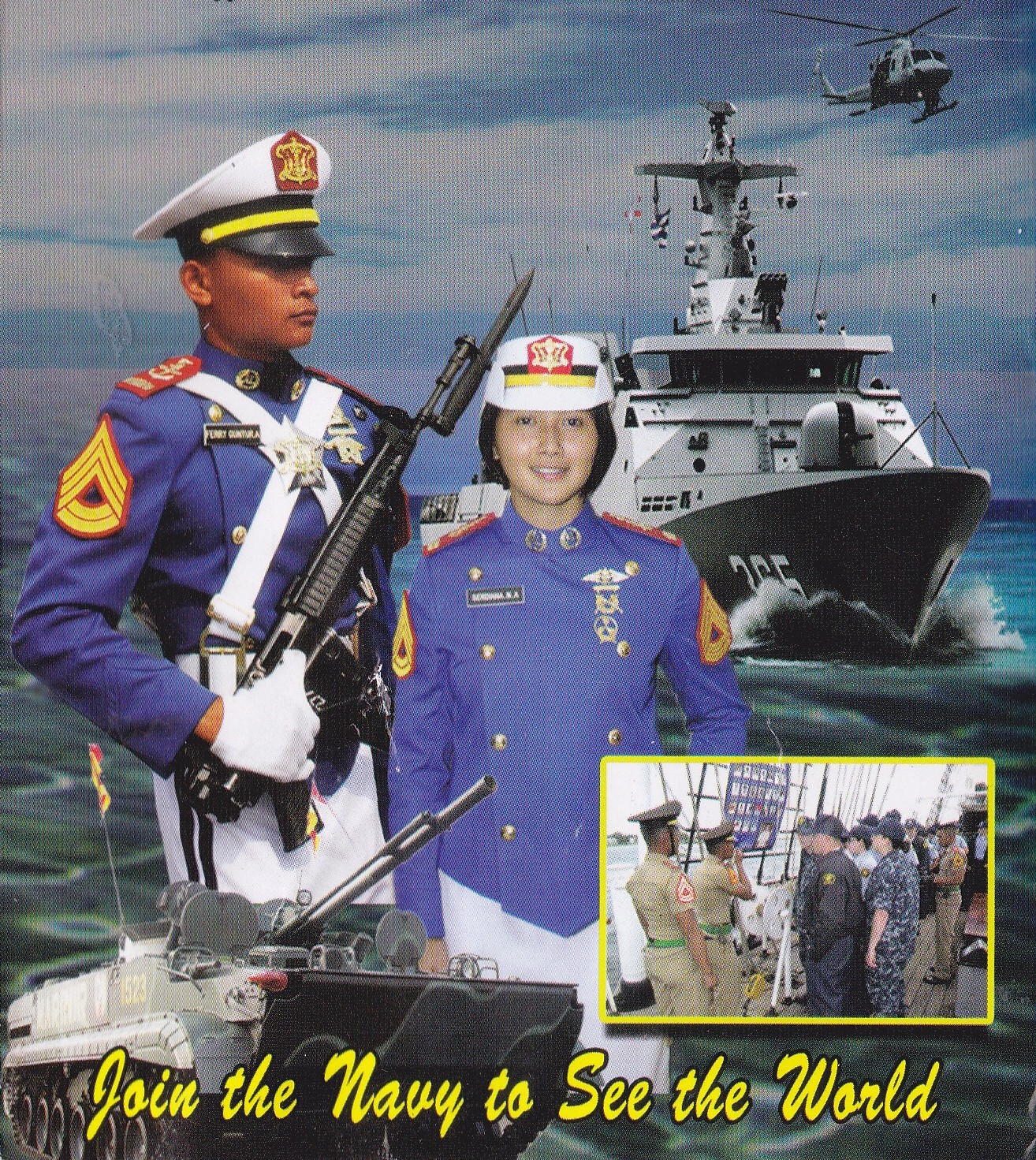
KRI Diponegoro on a recruiting poster.

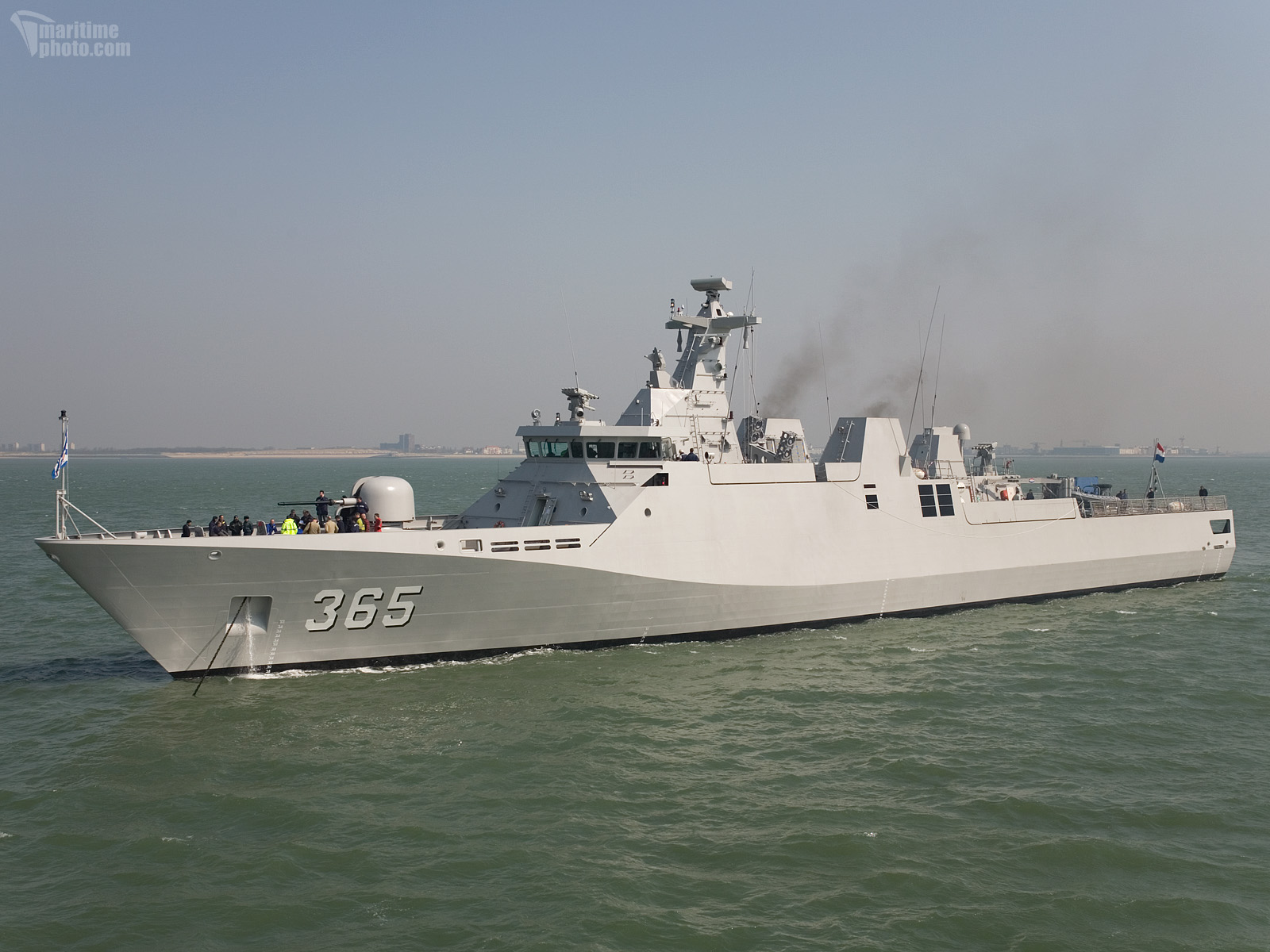
KRI Diponegoro on 2 April 2007.

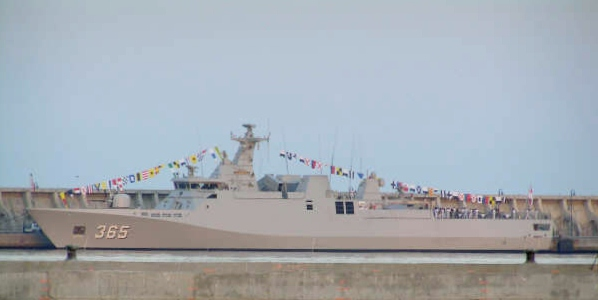
KRI Diponegoro in Málaga in 2008.

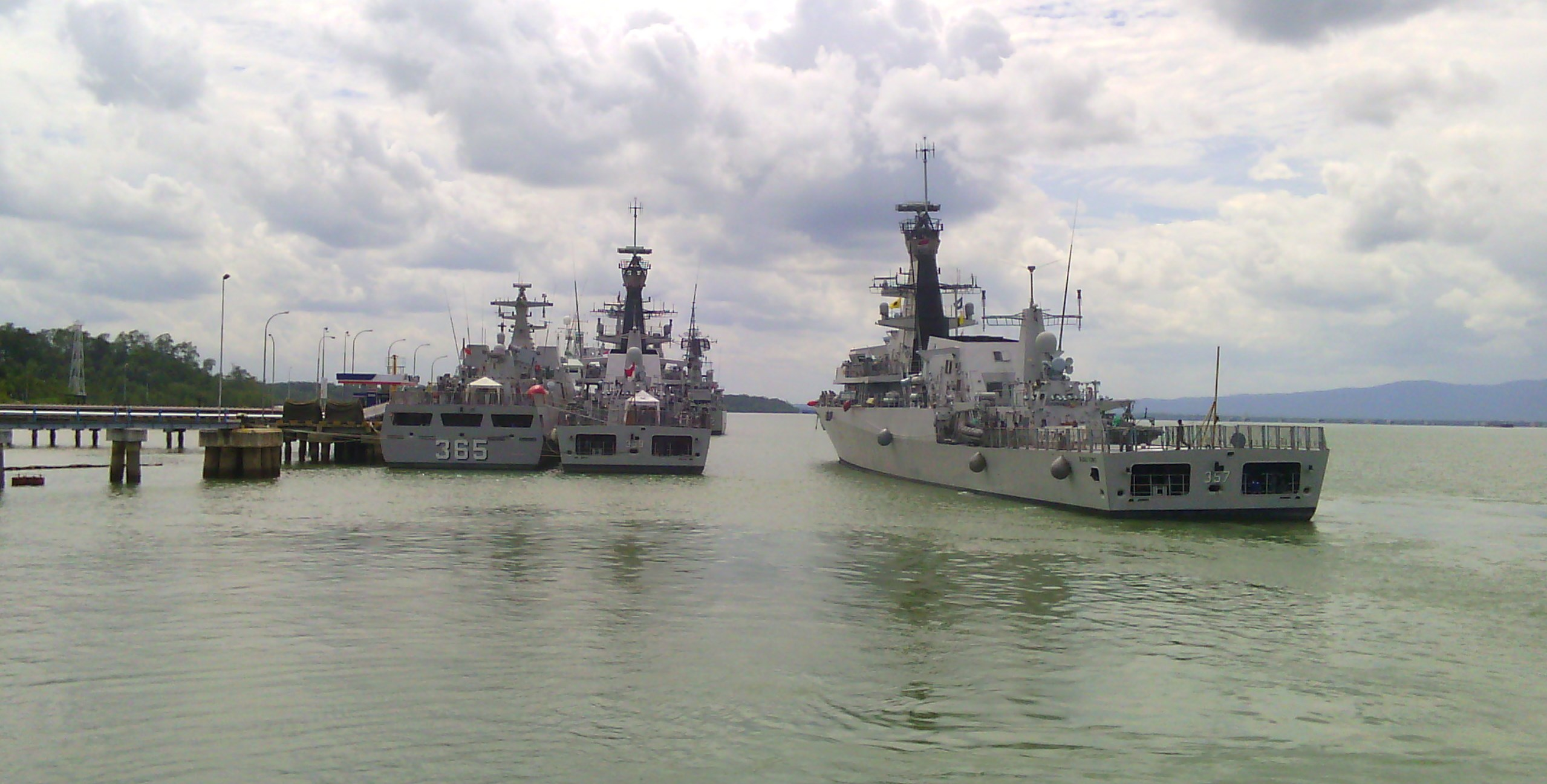
KRI Diponegoro, KRI Bung Tomo and KRI John Lie in Kota Bharu on 12 December 2014.

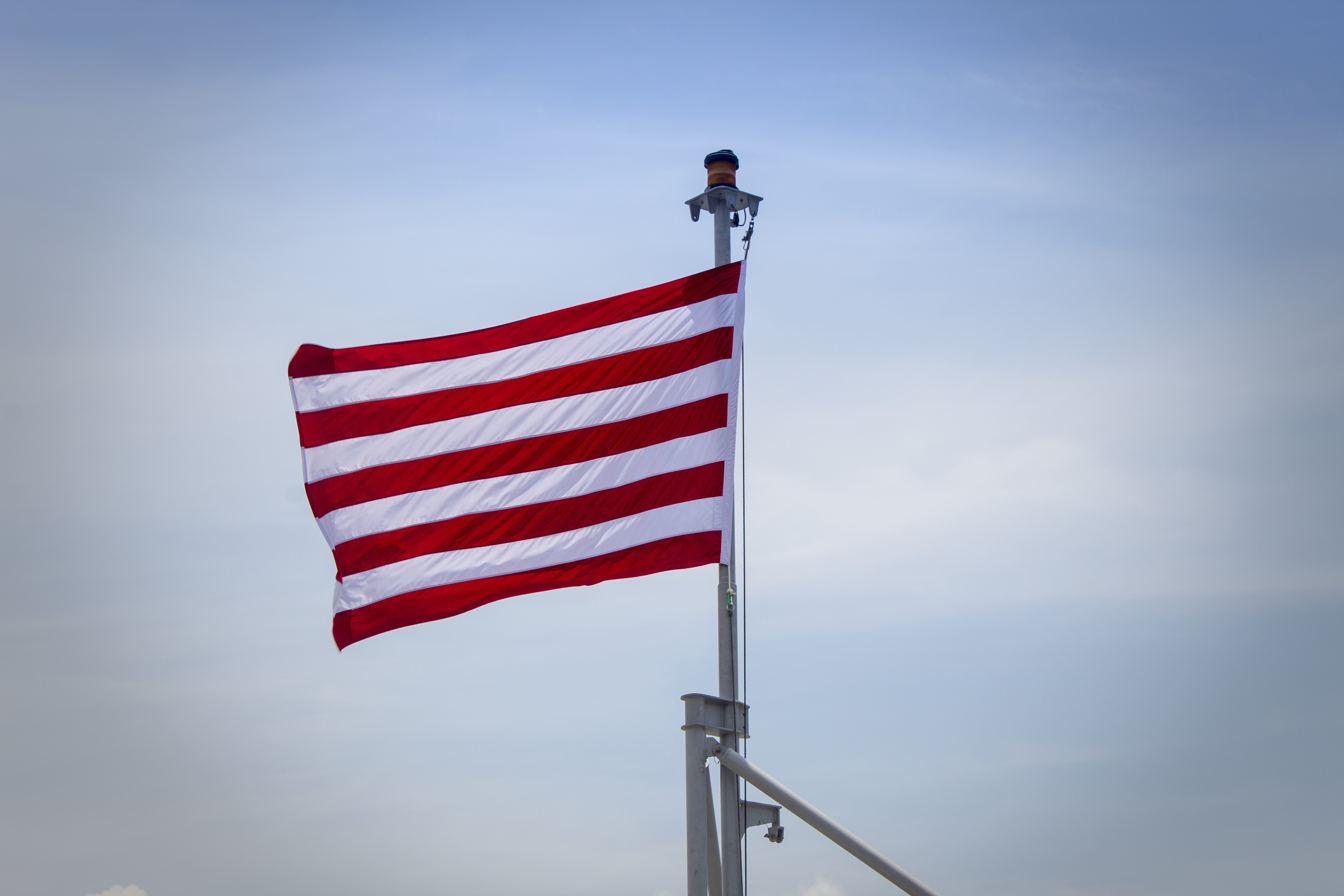
Naval jack of KRI Diponegoro on 6 October 2018.

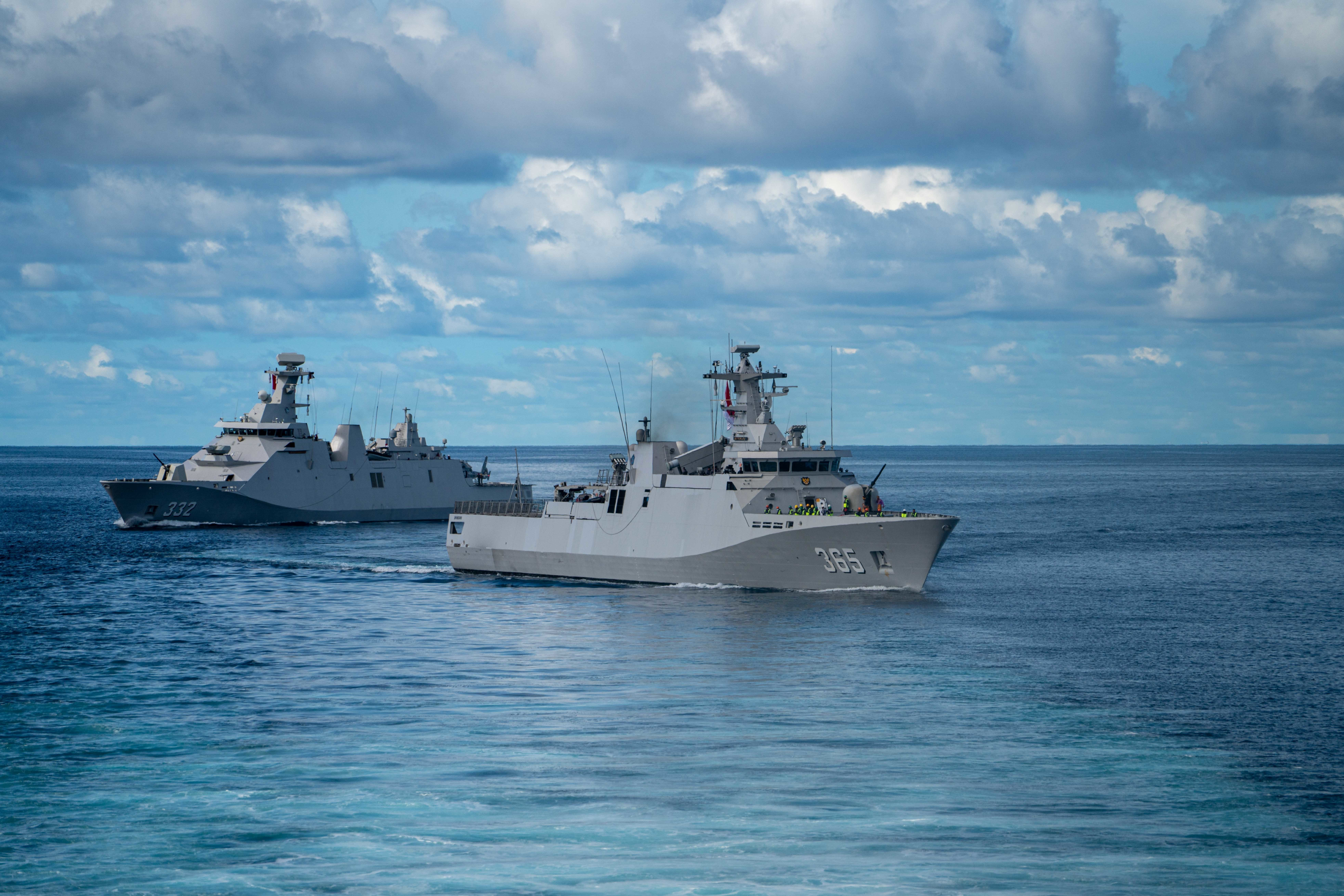
KRI Diponegoro and KRI I Gusti Ngurah Rai during CARAT Indonesia 2021.

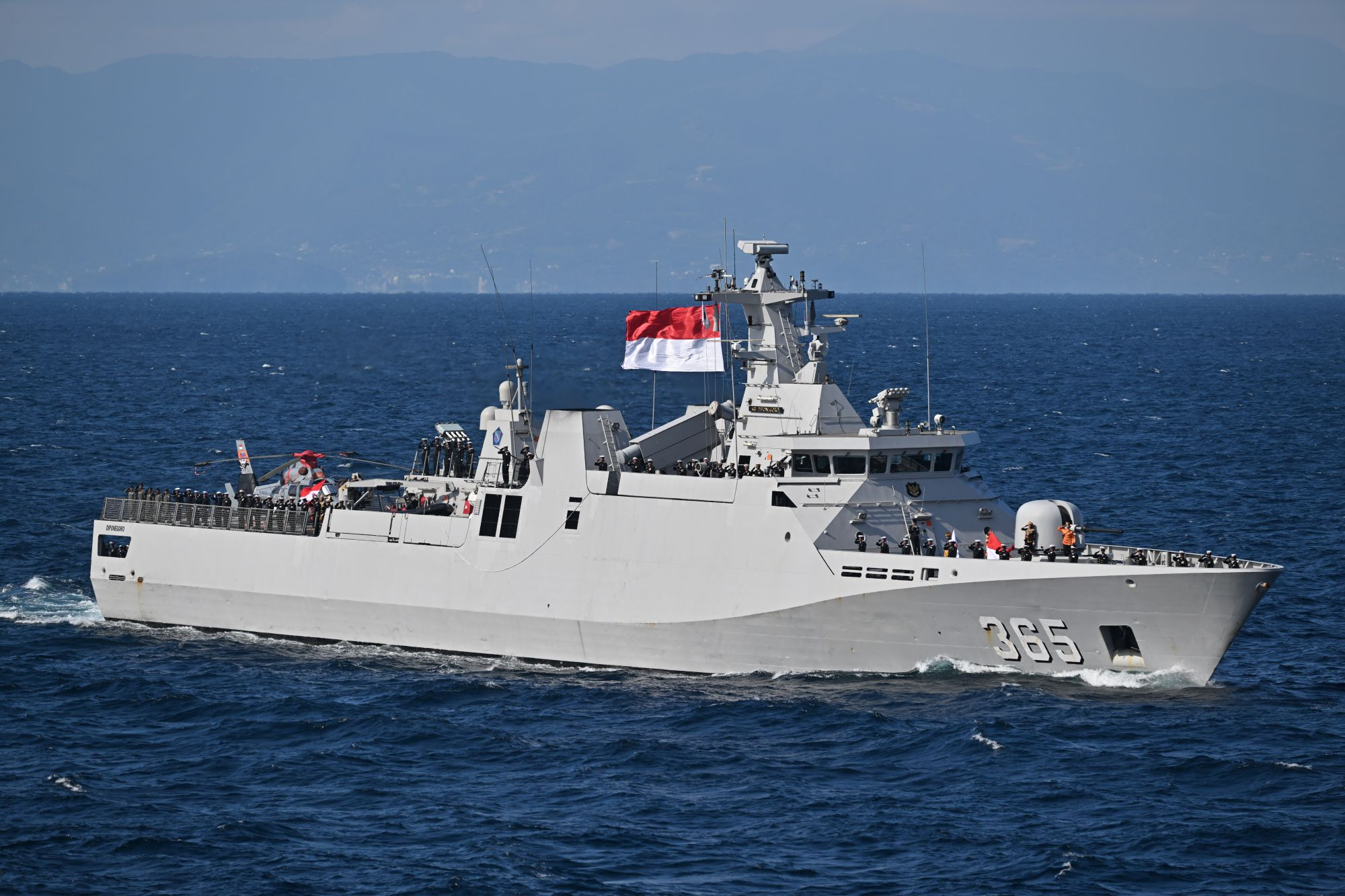
KRI Diponegoro during 2022 International Fleet Review, 6 November 2022.

== See also ==
- KRI Sultan Hasanuddin
- KRI Sultan Iskandar Muda
- KRI Frans Kaisiepo
