= KRI Frans Kaisiepo =

Diponegoro-class corvette of the Indonesian Navy

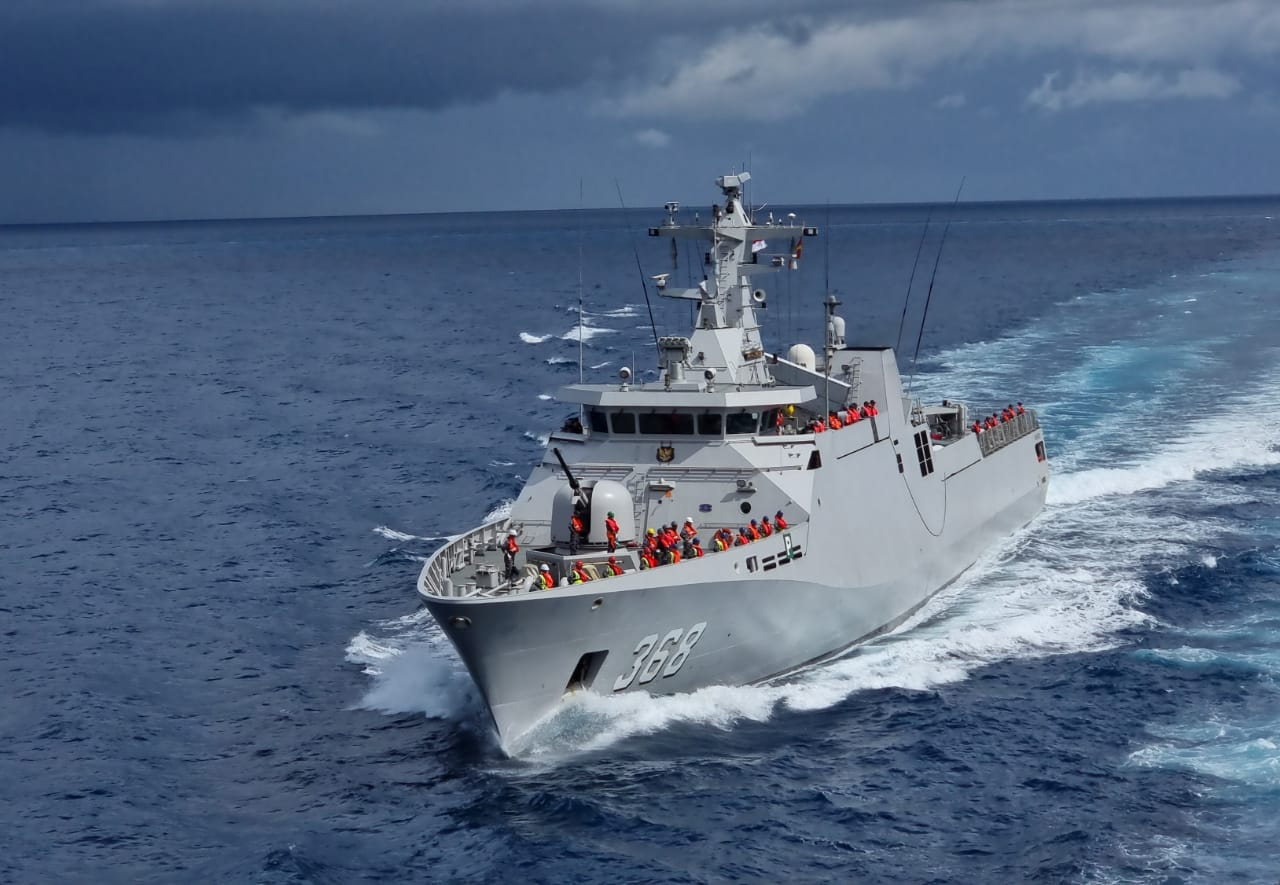
- KRI Frans Kaisiepo during Super Garuda Shield 2022

History

Indonesia
- Name: Frans Kaisiepo
- Namesake: Frans Kaisiepo
- Builder: Damen Group, Vlissingen
- Laid down: 8 May 2006
- Launched: 28 June 2008
- Commissioned: 7 March 2009
- Identification: IMO number: 9397975; MMSI number: 525014049; Callsign: PLER; Pennant number: 368
- Status: Active

General characteristics (Corvette 9113)
- Type: Diponegoro-class corvette
- Displacement: 1,692 tons
- Length: 90.71 m (297 ft 7 in)
- Beam: 13.02 m (42 ft 9 in)
- Draft: 3.60 m (11 ft 10 in)
- Propulsion: 2 × SEMT Pielstick 20PA6B STC rated at 8910 kW each driving a lightweight Geislinger coupling combination BE 72/20/125N + BF 110/50/2H (steel – composite coupling combination); 4 × Caterpillar 3406C TA generator rated at 350 kW each; 1 × Caterpillar 3304B emergency generator rated at 105 kW; 2 × shaft with Rolls-Royce Kamewa 5 bladed controllable pitch propeller; 2 × Renk ASL94 single step reduction gear with passive roll stabilization
- Speed: Maximum: 28 knots (52 km/h; 32 mph); Cruising: 18 knots (33 km/h; 21 mph); Economy: 14 knots (26 km/h; 16 mph)
- Range: Cruising speed at 18 kn (33 km/h; 21 mph): 3,600 nmi (6,700 km; 4,100 mi); Economy speed at 14 kn (26 km/h; 16 mph): 4,800 nmi (8,900 km; 5,500 mi)
- Complement: 20-80 crew
- Sensors & processing systems: Combat System: Thales Group TACTICOS with 4 x Multifunction Operator Console Mk 3 2H; Search radar: MW08 3D multibeam surveillance radar; IFF: Thales TSB 2525 Mk XA (integrated with MW08); Navigation radar: Sperry Marine BridgeMasterE ARPA radar; Fire control radar: LIROD Mk 2 tracking radar; Data Link: LINK Y Mk 2 datalink system; Sonar: Thales UMS 4132 Kingklip medium frequency active/passive ASW hull mounted sonar; Internal Communications: Thales Communication's Fibre Optical COmmunications Network (FOCON) or EID's ICCS where on-board users have access to internal and/or external communication channels and integrated remote control of communications equipment; Satellite Comms: Nera F series; Navigation System: Raytheon Anschutz integrated navigation; Integrated Platform Management System: Imtech UniMACs 3000 Integrated Bridge System
- Electronic warfare & decoys: ESM: Thales DR3000; ECM: Racal Scorpion 2L; Decoy: TERMA SKWS, DLT-12T 130mm decoy launchers, port, starboard
- Armament: Guns: 1 × Oto Melara 76 mm gun (A position) 2 × 20 mm Denel GI-2 gun (B position); Missiles: 2 × quad (8) Mistral TETRAL Anti-air missile, forward & aft 4 × Exocet MM40 Block III anti-surface vessel missile; Torpedoes: 2 × triple launchers for 3A 244S Mode II/EuroTorp MU 90 torpedoes
- Aviation facilities: Helipad

KRI Frans Kaisiepo (368) is a Diponegoro-class corvette of the Indonesian Navy.

== Development ==
The Diponegoro-class guided-missile corvettes of the Indonesian Navy are SIGMA 9113 types of the Netherlands-designed Sigma family of modular naval vessels, named after Indonesian Prince Diponegoro. Currently there are 4 Diponegoro-class corvette in service.

== Construction and career ==
Frans Kaisiepo was laid down on 8 May 2006 and launched on 28 June 2008 by Damen Group, Vlissingen. She was commissioned on 7 March 2009.
