= Frans Kaisiepo =

Papuan politician and Indonesian nationalist (1921–1979)

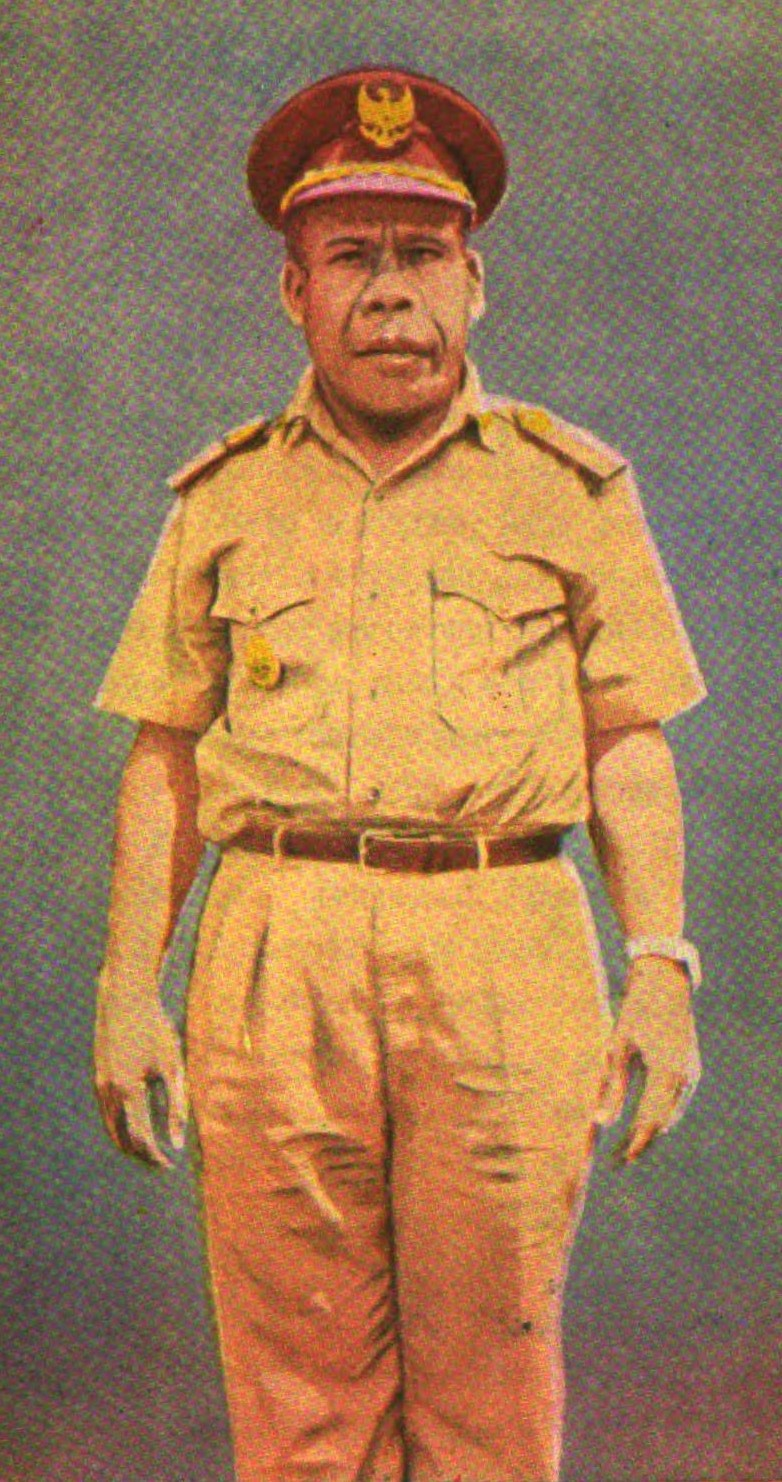

4th Governor of Irian Jaya (Note: At the time Kaisiepo came into office, the name of the Province was “West Irian”. The name later changed to “Irian Jaya” whilst Kaisiepo was still in office. It is now known as Papua Province.)
- In office 26 November 1964 – 29 June 1973
- President: Sukarno; Suharto
- Deputy: Agus Subekti; Mohammad Sarwono
- Preceded by: Eliëzer Jan Bonaÿ
- Succeeded by: Acub Zainal

Personal details
- Born: 10 October 1921 Biak, Department of New Guinea, Dutch East Indies
- Died: 10 April 1979 (aged 57) Jayapura, Papua, Indonesia
- Spouses: Anthomina Arwam; Maria Moorwahyuni (m. 1973)
- Children: Manuel Kaisiepo

Frans Kaisiepo (10 October 1921 – 10 April 1979) was a Papuan politician and Indonesian nationalist. He served as the fourth Governor of Papua Province. In 1993, Kaisiepo was posthumously declared a National Hero of Indonesia (Indonesian: Pahlawan Nasional Indonesia) for his lifelong efforts to unite West Irian with Indonesia. As the representative of Papua province, he was involved in the Malino Conference, where the formation of the United States of Indonesia was discussed.

== Biography ==
Kaisiepo was born on the island of Biak on 10 October 1921. He studied at Sekolah Guru Normal at Manokwari. Kaisiepo, and later attended a Civil Administration course at the School of Civil Service in New Guinea.

=== Indonesian nationalism ===
In 1945, Kaisiepo met Sugoro Atmoprasodjo at the School of Civil Service (Bestuur School). They quickly found common ground due to their shared support for Indonesian independence. Kaisiepo often held discreet meetings to discuss the annexation of Dutch New Guinea by the Republic of Indonesia. During one of these tribal meeting to discuss new name for Papua in Tobati, Jayapura, he suggested the name from Mansren Koreri myths, Iri-an from the Biak language of Biak Island, meaning "hot land" referring to the local hot climate, but also from Iryan which means heated process as a metaphor for the land that is entering a new era. Other desirable meanings were found in many native Papuan languages, so they agreed to adopt the new name. He with his brother Markus Kaisiepo then wrote an article in British Columbia Camp newsletter with the title “PAPUA or IRIAN” published on 8 September 1945 to promote its adoption. By this time he and Marcus also lead an effort to change the name of the civil service school, from Papua Bestuur School to Irian Bestuur School.

In July 1946, Kaisiepo was the West New Guinean delegate and only Papuan native at the Malino Conference in South Sulawesi. This was because the first choice delegate Silas Papare was captured and exiled to Serui due to his participation in a failed rebellion in December 1945. Before going to Malino on 9 July 1946, on the advice of Corinus Krey, he alongside Corinus secretly met with Sugoro, who was imprisoned in Abepura due to his participation in the same failed rebellion, facilitated by colonial prison guard Elly Uyo and member of Papuan Battalion, Johan Aer. In this meeting they agreed to promote the name “Irian”. As delegate, he suggested the territory be called "Irian", explaining the word means "steamy" in his native Biak. Among Indonesian nationalists such as Papare, Indey, Krey, and others, "IRIAN" also meant "Ikut Republik Indonesia Anti Nederlands" (English: Join Republic of Indonesia Anti Netherlands). In the same month, with his involvement, the Partai Indonesia Merdeka (English: Indonesia Independence Party) was reactivated in Biak, with Lukas Rumkorem as the party's elected leader. The party was the first political party in Biak, founded in September 1945 based in Nusi, before moved to Bosnek after January 1946.

=== Political career ===
Upon release from prison in the year 1961, and during his time as district head in Mimika, Kaisiepo established Irian Sebagian Indonesia (ISI) Party. that strove to unite Netherlands New Guinea with the Republic of Indonesia. To envisage the decolonization of Netherlands New Guinea, President Sukarno made a speech that established the Trikora (Tri Komando Rakyat, "People's Triple Command") on 19 December 1961 in Yogyakarta. The command's goals were:

- aborting the formation of the "Papua state" as created by colonial Dutch powers
- raising the Indonesian flag in West Irian, thus affirming Indonesian sovereignty in the area
- preparing mobilization to "defend the independence and unification of the motherland"

As a result of this historic address, many Indonesians including exiles from Papua, volunteers from Singapore and Malaya chose to join in organisation called Perintis Irian Barat (PIB), and was organised into volunteer battalions such as Yon Karya Jaya I under Kodam Jaya V, as part of Operation Trikora. While members of ISI would later be trained to coordinate with Indonesian infiltration forces that managed to land in Mimika.

The Dutch and Indonesian governments signed an agreement known as the New York Agreement on 15 August 1962, 12:01 hours, and the transfer of government administration to UNTEA occurred on 1 October 1962. The transfer of West Irian to Indonesia was conducted by the United Nations the following year on 1 May 1963. Meanwhile, the Indonesian government would be entrusted with developing the region from 1963 to 1969, and at the end of that year, the Papuans would have to decide whether or not to join Indonesia or remain autonomous.

The first governor of Irian was Elieser Jan Bonay, who held the office for less than a year (1963–64). In the beginning, Bonay sided with the Indonesians. However, in 1964, he used the Act of Free Choice in Irian Jaya to call for the independence of West Irian as a separate country; this request was forwarded to the United Nations. His action caused him to resign from his post in 1964, when Kaisiepo replaced him as governor. He later joined as officials in Indonesian Ministry of Home Affairs, before working in Regional state companies from 1972 to 1979. Because of his disappointment with the Suharto military regime, he would later join the Papuan exile in Wijhe, the Netherlands since 1982, leaving his family in Indonesia and playing an important role in the Free Papua Movement.

During Kaisiepo's term as governor of Irian, he strove to promote Papua as part of Indonesia, by campaigning in all regencies like Merauke, Jayawijaya, Paniai, Fak-fak, Sorong, Manokwari, Teluk Cendrawasih and Jayapura for unification. This encouraged support within the state for the Act of Free Choice option of unification, as opposed to full independence, despite huge opposition from some Papuan natives. In 1969, following the Act of free Choice, in which 1,022 Papuan figures chosen by Indonesia voted for incorporation, Irian became part of Indonesia as Irian Jaya (later Papua) Province. According to Drooglever, during his time as governor the population of Papuan increased and the education level improved compared with situation under Dutch colonial authority. For his efforts in the unification of Papua with Indonesia, he was elected an MP for Papua in the People's Consultative Assembly elections of 1973 and was appointed to the Supreme Advisory Council in 1977 as its representative for Papuan affairs.

=== Death ===
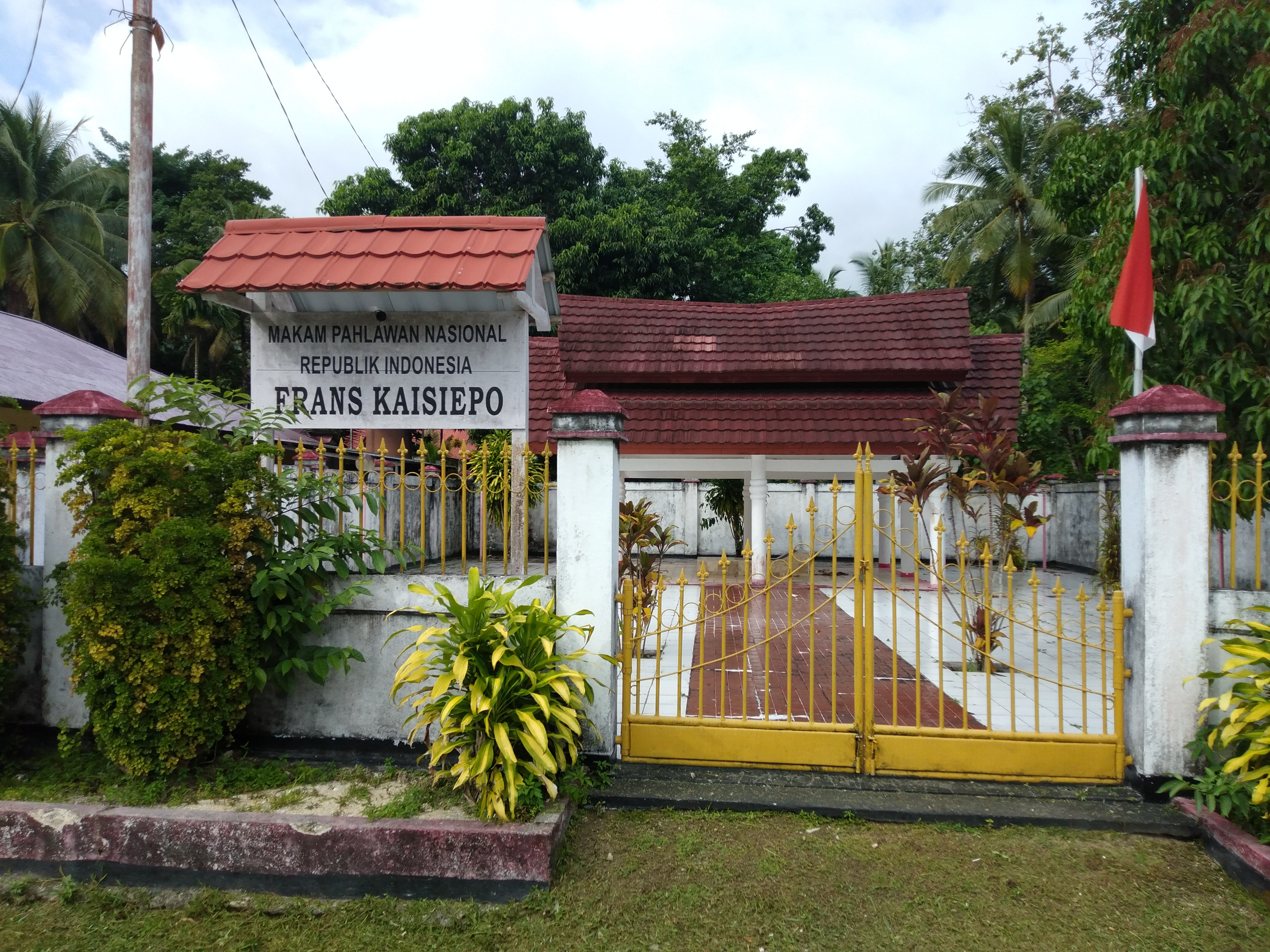
Tomb of National Hero Frans Kaisiepo at Kampung Mokmer, Biak Island, Papua, Indonesia

Kaisiepo died on 10 April 1979. He was interred in a plot of land across the street from Cendrawasih Heroes' Cemetery (Indonesian: Taman Makam Pahlawan Cendrawasih) in Biak, which is now designated as the Tomb of National Hero Frans Kaisiepo (Makam Pahlawan Nasional Frans Kaisiepo). The tomb and the cemetery are located several kilometers east of the Frans Kaisiepo Airport, named after Kaisiepo himself.

== Family ==
Kaisiepo married Anthomina Arwam and had three children. The couple remained together until Arwam's death. On 12 November 1973, he married Maria Magdalena Moorwahyuni, a Christian woman from aristocratic Tjondronegoro family, with her great-grandfather being Bupati of Kudus, Central Java. They had one son together and later adopted a daughter.

== Legacy ==
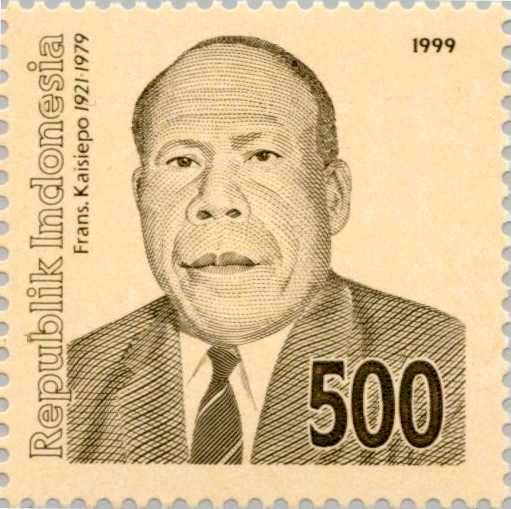
1999 Frans Kaisiepo stamp issued by Pos Indonesia.

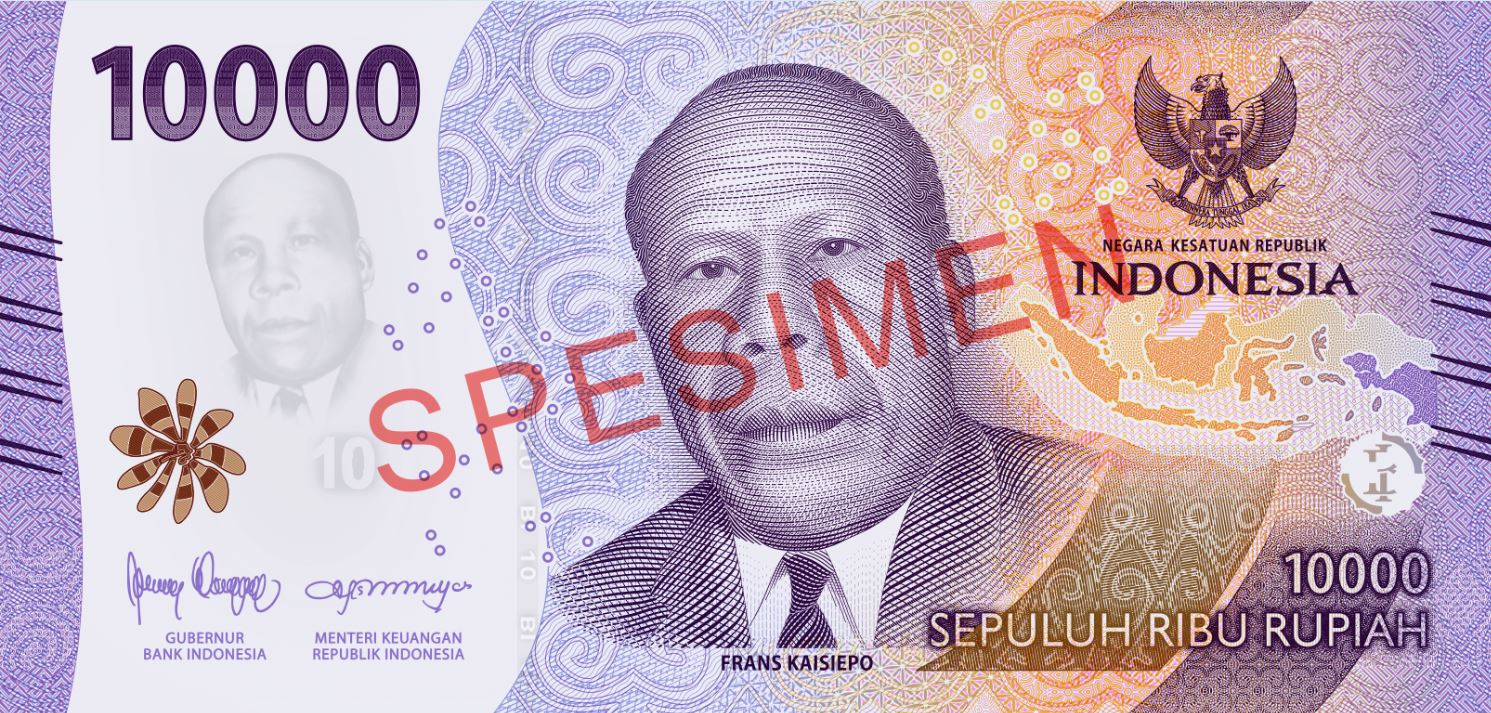
10,000 rupiah banknote featuring Frans Kaisiepo, issued by Bank Indonesia in 2022.

Due to his meritorious service, Frans Kaisiepo was awarded Bintang Mahaputera Adipradana by the Indonesian government. Frans Kaisiepo desired national unity, and worked toward that goal all of his life. He was honored posthumously as a National Hero of Indonesia on the 30th anniversary of the handover of Papua to Indonesia in 1993.

He is also the namesake of the local airport serving Biak, known as the Frans Kaisiepo Airport. An Indonesian naval ship, KRI Frans Kaisiepo, is named after him.

Kaisiepo is among the historical figures chosen to be depicted in the 2016 edition of Indonesian rupiah banknotes. His picture is on the Rp10,000 note. Kaisiepo is also featured on the newer 2022 banknote series.
