= Geislinger coupling =

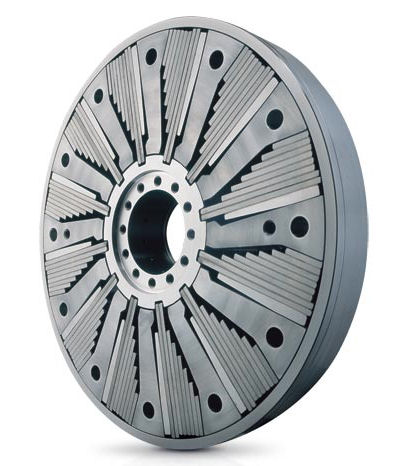
The Geislinger coupling is a torsional elastic, high-damping steel spring coupling with hydrodynamic damping. High reliability, long intervals between overhauls, and low life-cycle cost are its main advantages.

The Geislinger coupling is an all-metal coupling for rotating shafts. It is elastic in torsion, allowing it to absorb torsional vibration.

Unlike some other coupling types, it is not intended to compensate for high radial misalignment between shafts, but it can compensate for axial misalignments better than elastomer couplings. The coupling may have a small ability to compensate for varying alignment, but if this is needed it is generally done through using an additional coupling in tandem. The coupling also runs at the same speed for input and output shafts, unlike a torque converter.

== Development ==
The design was invented by Dr. Ing. Leonhard Geislinger in 1958. Its first use was for large diesel engines in locomotives, but it is also widely used in ships.

Geislinger couplings are constructed inside robust enclosed steel housings. An outer housing and a central hub, or "inner star" form the input and output drive members. Internally, the drive is transmitted through radial leaf springs. The steel leaf springs are available in several configurations, and the stiffness increases linearly with displacement. These leaf springs are damped by a damping ring, the tips of the longest leaves engaging in splines in the inner star.

Hydraulic damping is provided, as the leaf springs are immersed in oil. Any movement of the spring plates must squeeze oil through the narrow gaps around them between the plates and the casing. As the springs have a high surface area, yet there is only a small gap between them and their housing, the damping factor can be high. Damping can be adjusted completely independently from the coupling's torsional stiffness. The oil used for damping is usually supplied by the engine lubrication system, through a drilling in the crankshaft. If this is unavailable, an oil-filled coupling can be used. This oil filling also aids lubrication and encourages a long service life.

== Uses ==
The coupling is mostly used on the output of large diesel engines. It isolates vibration between engines, shafts and driven components. A major benefit can be to avoid resonance problems where systems have a critical speed that must be avoided. The use of a damped coupling can shift this frequency to an unimportant speed, outside the engine operation speed range and damp resonance peak. The Geislinger coupling's ability to easily tailor its damping is valuable here to allow tuning for a particular frequency. The nearly linear torsional stiffness makes it easy to calculate torsional vibrations.

== Advantages ==
- High damping. The ratio between damping and elastic torques can be between 0.2 and 0.7, considerably higher than for an elastomeric coupling.
- Wide range of stiffness variation. Stiffness and damping are adjustable independent to each other. These can also be adjusted by swapping spring packs, without needing to replace an entire coupling.
- No aging. Unlike elastomer couplings, the materials do not change or wear out over time. Stiffness and damping remain constant in service.
- High permissible torques (up to 6,500 kN⋅m) and high resistance to vibratory torques.
- Unaffected by hot and oily environment.
- The coupling may continue in service, even with broken spring plates.
- Compact design.

== Disadvantages ==
- The coupling is large and relatively complex. It is best suited to high-power applications. In small applications, a simpler elastomeric gear or spline coupling is adequate and sometimes cheaper.

== Geislinger damper ==
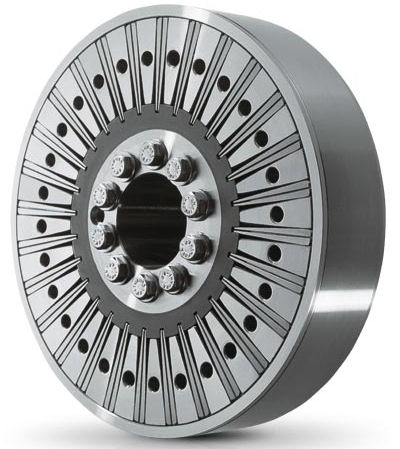
The Geislinger damper utilizes steel leaf springs and engine oil

A related device is the Geislinger damper. This is broadly the same coupling, but both input and output shafts are connected to the same central hub. The massive outer casing is connected to this through similar leaf spring packs, but is free to move torsionally, with damping. It is used as a harmonic damper to control vibrations in shafts.

The steel springs are tuned to optimize the natural frequency of a system, and engine oil is used to reduce torsional vibrations. Geislinger uses specially developed software to select the specific damper parameters which best protect the engine crank- and camshaft, as well as intermediate and propeller shafts from damage due to critical vibratory loads. The Geislinger damper provides constant stiffness and very high damping over the damper life, independent of engine room temperature.
