= MW08 =

Thales MW 08
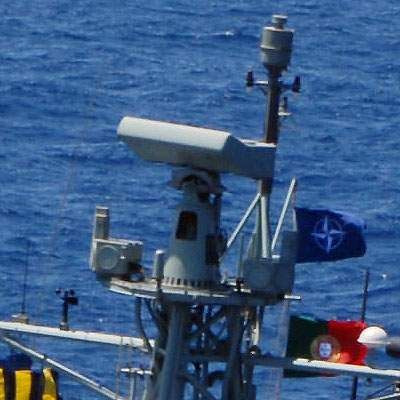
- Thales MW 08
- Country of origin: Netherlands
- Introduced: unknown
- No. built: unknown
- Type: 3D Air/Surface Search
- Frequency: G band
- Range: 0.1m^{2} target: 17 km 1m^{2} target: 27 km 2m^{2} target: 32 km
- Altitude: unknown
- Azimuth: unknown
- Elevation: unknown
- Precision: Resolution In bearing: 2^{0} In range: 90 m Tracking accuracy In bearing: 0.25^{0} In range: 40 m In elevation: 1.2^{0} Tracking capacity Air targets: 20 (basic configuration); Surface targets: 8 (basic configuration) Surface targets: 2 (gun-fire accuracy control)
- Power: 50 kW (Peak)

Thales Naval Nederland (formerly Signaal) MW08 is a G-band passive electronically scanned array target indication 3D radar, part of the 3D multibeam 'SMART' (Signal Multibeam Acquisition Radar for Tracking) family which includes E/F band (former S band) SMART-S/SMART-S Mk2 and D band (former L-band) SMART-L.

== Design ==
MW08 transmits six 2 by 12 degree stacked beams up to 70 degrees for height finding and is capable of fully automatic detection and tracking (ADT). The radar also directs gunfire against surface targets by 3 Track-While-Scan surface windows with splash plotting capability, but does not provide up-link commands to surface-to-air missiles in flight. In February 1996 Jane's International Defence Review reported that the radar was no longer offered to new customers due to Thales Group's product rationalization policy favoring MRR 3D radar developed by Thales France, formerly Thomson-CSF. However the policy has been quietly reversed.

== Users ==
MW08 is installed on the following ship classes.

- South Korea: 3 Gwanggaeto the Great-class destroyer, 4+2 Chungmugong Yi Sun-shin-class destroyer, 1 Dokdo-class amphibious assault ship
- Greece: 4 Hydra class frigates, 7 Roussen Class FACM
- Portugal: 3 Vasco da Gama-class frigate
- Turkey: 7 Kilic class fast attack craft
- Oman: 2 Qahir class corvettes
- Indonesia: 4 Sigma class corvettes
