= Super Garuda Shield =

Military exercise

Exercise Super Garuda Shield
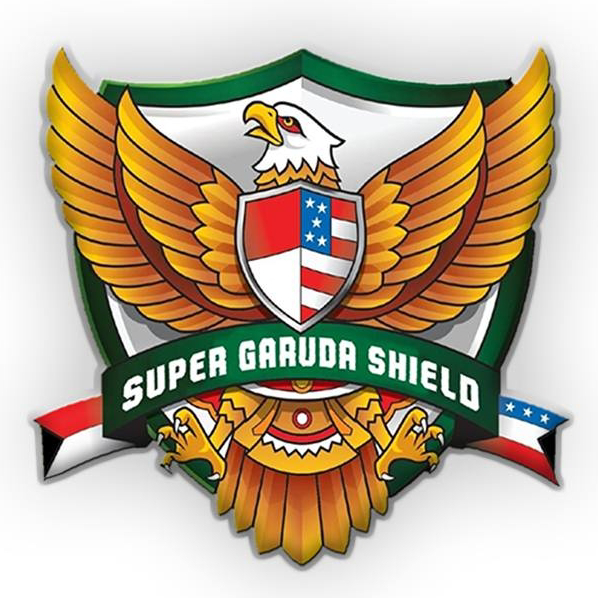
- Status: Active
- Genre: Multinational military exercise
- Frequency: Annual
- Location: Indonesia
- Years active: 2007–present
- Members: 13 Participants; 11 Observers (2025) List: Australia; Brazil; Brunei; Cambodia; Canada; Fiji; France; Germany; India; Indonesia; Japan; Malaysia; Netherlands; New Zealand; Papua New Guinea; Philippines; Saudi Arabia; Singapore; South Korea; Thailand; Timor Leste; United Kingdom; United States; Vanuatu; 9 Past Participants List: Bangladesh; China; Italy; Mongolia; Nepal; Russia; Sri Lanka; Tonga; Vietnam
- Organized by: United States Indo-Pacific Command; Indonesian National Armed Forces

Super Garuda Shield (formerly Garuda Shield) is a two-week multinational military exercise between the United States Armed Forces, Indonesian National Armed Forces, and multiple partner nations. The purpose of this joint exercise is to maintain peace and security, including to strengthen relationships within the Indo-Pacific region by enhancing military capabilities, interoperability, and collective commitment to a free and open Indo-Pacific. This joint-exercise is annually conducted since 2007 in Indonesia.

== Overview ==
The first Garuda Shield, in 2007, was designed to improve the military capabilities and cooperation between the U.S. and Indonesian armies. It started as a bilateral exercise between the U.S. and Indonesia, focusing on specific aspects of military training and interoperability.

Over the years, the exercise has expanded to include other countries and military branches, becoming a multinational combined arms exercise. The exercise reflects the increasing strategic importance of Indonesia in the Indo-Pacific region and the U.S.'s interest in strengthening its relationship with Indonesia through military cooperation.

Super Garuda Shield, the current iteration, emphasizes strengthening relationships within the Indo-Pacific region, including enhancing military capabilities, interoperability, and collective commitment to a free and open Indo-Pacific. The exercise typically includes field training exercises, command post exercises, and humanitarian civic action projects.

== Garuda Shield 2007 – 2021 ==
=== Garuda Shield 2007 ===
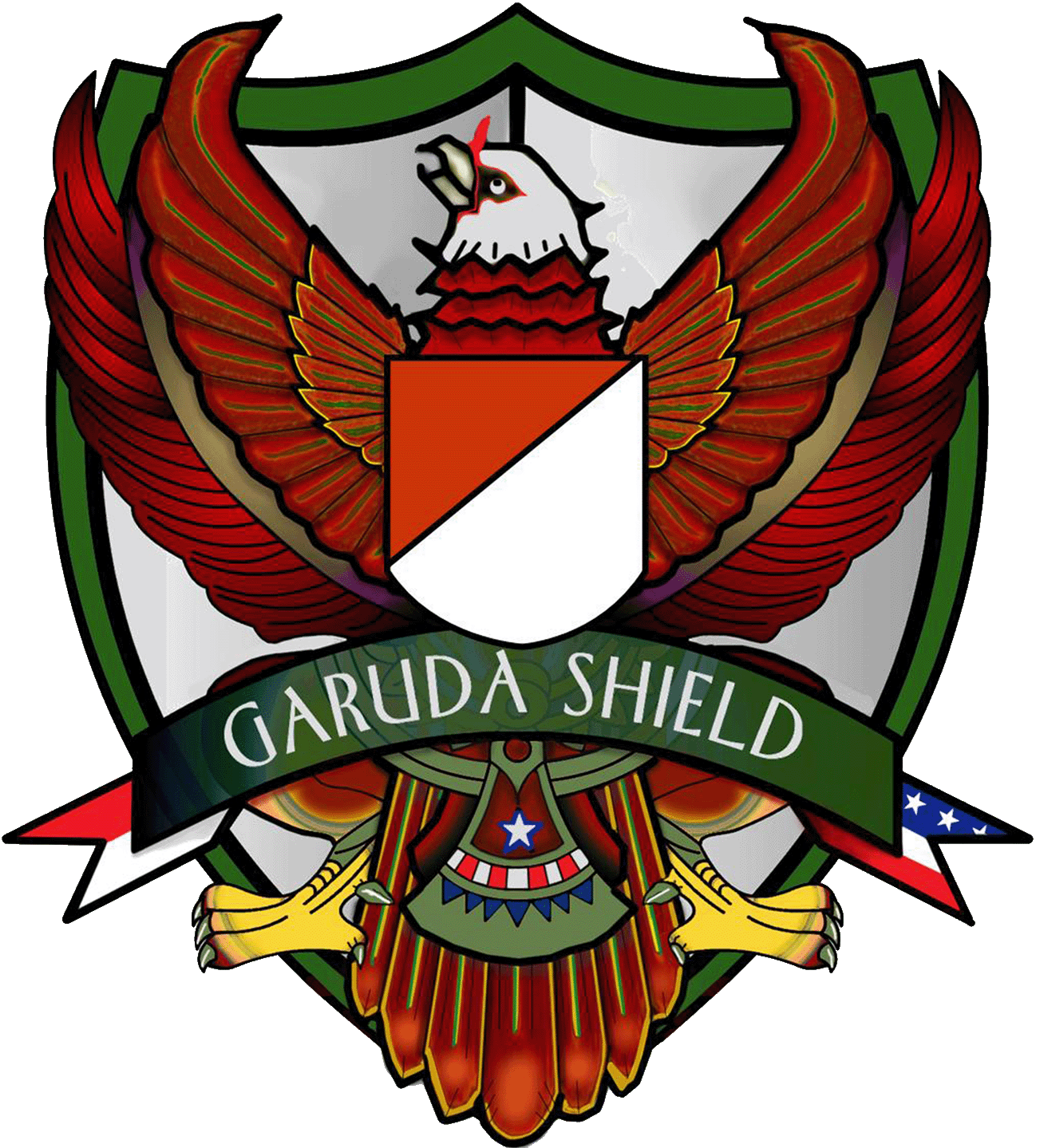
Garuda Shield 2007 logo.

The opening ceremony of Garuda Shield 2007 (GS-1/2007) was inaugurated by the Indonesian Army and the U.S. Army at the Salak Hotel, Bogor, West Java, on 16 April 2007, attended by the Chief of Staff of the Indonesian Army General Djoko Santoso and the Commanding General of the U.S. Army Pacific Lt. General John M. Brown III.

The exercise was participated by 72 Indonesian Army officers and 80 U.S. Army service members from United States Army Pacific from 16 to 27 April 2007, at Kostrad 1st Infantry Division Headquarter, in Cilodong, West Java, Indonesia. The exercise aims to improve joint brigade-level staff officers' cooperation and coordination capabilities in support of the United Nations (UN) Peacekeeping Operations.

Exercise Garuda Shield 2007 is a sequence of command post-exercises held in Indonesia that focused on improving peace support and civil-military operations capabilities. This initiative is led by the common goal of Indonesia and the U.S. to maintain peace, security, and stability in the Asia-Pacific region.

=== Garuda Shield 2008 ===
The joint exercise Garuda Shield 2008 (GS-2/2008) between the Indonesian Army and United States Army Pacific (USARPAC) officially opened at the Timor Ball Room, Borobudur Hotel, Central Jakarta, in 31 March 2008, led by the Commander of Jayakarta Military Regional Command (Kodam Jaya) of the Indonesian Army, Maj. Gen. Johannes Suryo Prabowo and Deputy Commanding General for the U.S. Army Pacific, Brig. Gen. Alexander I. Kozlov.

The personnel who participated in the joint training from the United States were represented by the U.S. Army from the 9th Mission Support Command (MSC), Hawaii National Guard’s 29th Brigade for U.S. Army Pacific (USARPAC) with the number of personnel ranging from the rank of Non-Commissioned Officer to Brigadier General totaling 108 personnel, while from Indonesia involving a unit at the level of the Kodam Jaya Brigade totaling 100 personnels.

This joint exercise was carried out from 29 March 2008 to 11 April 2008. The training material was in the form of a staff coordination simulation in the implementation of peace assistance tasks in conflict areas in the framework of military operations other than war. With the aim of building military cooperation between the Indonesian Army and USARPAC with a focus on improving the ability of cooperation and coordination of joint Brigade-level staff in supporting UN peace operations.

=== Garuda Shield 2009 ===
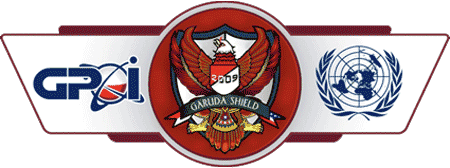
Garuda Shield 2009 logo

This was the third year for the Garuda Shield joint-exercise. This joint-exercise took place in Bandung, West Java, Indonesia. It is a continuation of ongoing joint efforts co sponsored by the U.S. military (USPACOM) and Indonesian Army to provide assistance and training to the Indonesian military, support U.S. and Indonesian security objectives, and provide certification for Indonesian instructors on all levels of the Global Peacekeeping Operation Initiative. Several other nations were invited to join the exercise. The following nations were

- Australia
- Bangladesh
- Brazil
- Brunei
- Cambodia
- Canada
- China
- France
- Germany
- India
- Italy
- Japan
- Malaysia
- Mongolia
- Nepal
- New Zealand
- Philippines
- Russia
- Sri Lanka
- South Korea
- Thailand
- Tonga
- United Kingdom
- Vietnam.

=== Garuda Shield 2010 ===
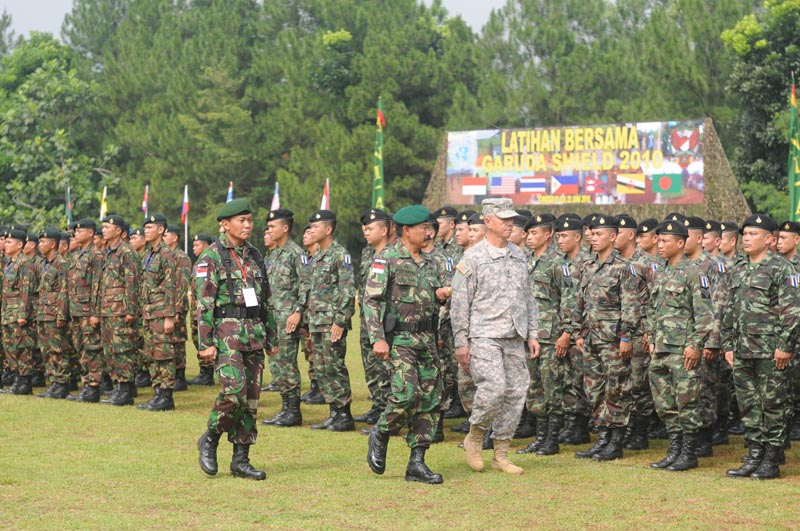
Col. Nono Mulyono, Maj. Gen. Soenarko, and Maj. Gen. Robert G.F. Lee reviewed the more than 1,100 troops representing six nations standing in formation at the Opening Ceremony for Garuda Shield 2010.

Garuda Shield 2010 was held in June 2010 in Cipatat, Bandung, Indonesia. As part of the exercise, staff officers from the Pacific Command, the HIARNG, USARPAC, and the TNI will form a brigade to test peace support and stability operations capabilities. As part of the exercise, staff officers from the Pacific Command, the HIARNG, USARPAC, and the TNI will form a brigade to test peace support and stability operations capabilities. Other troops are in the middle of conducting a field training exercise to exchange UN standardized organizational tactics, techniques and procedures to improve tactical interoperability. Meanwhile, engineers are working in Indonesia's rural communities to provide humanitarian civic actions (HCA). Every day scores of children mil about the construction sites to watch the progress. Engineer partners are making quick work of a baby clinic, community center and amphitheatre. Countries that were represented are

- Indonesia
- United States
- Thailand
- Philippines
- Nepal
- Brunei
- Bangladesh

=== Garuda Shield 2011 ===
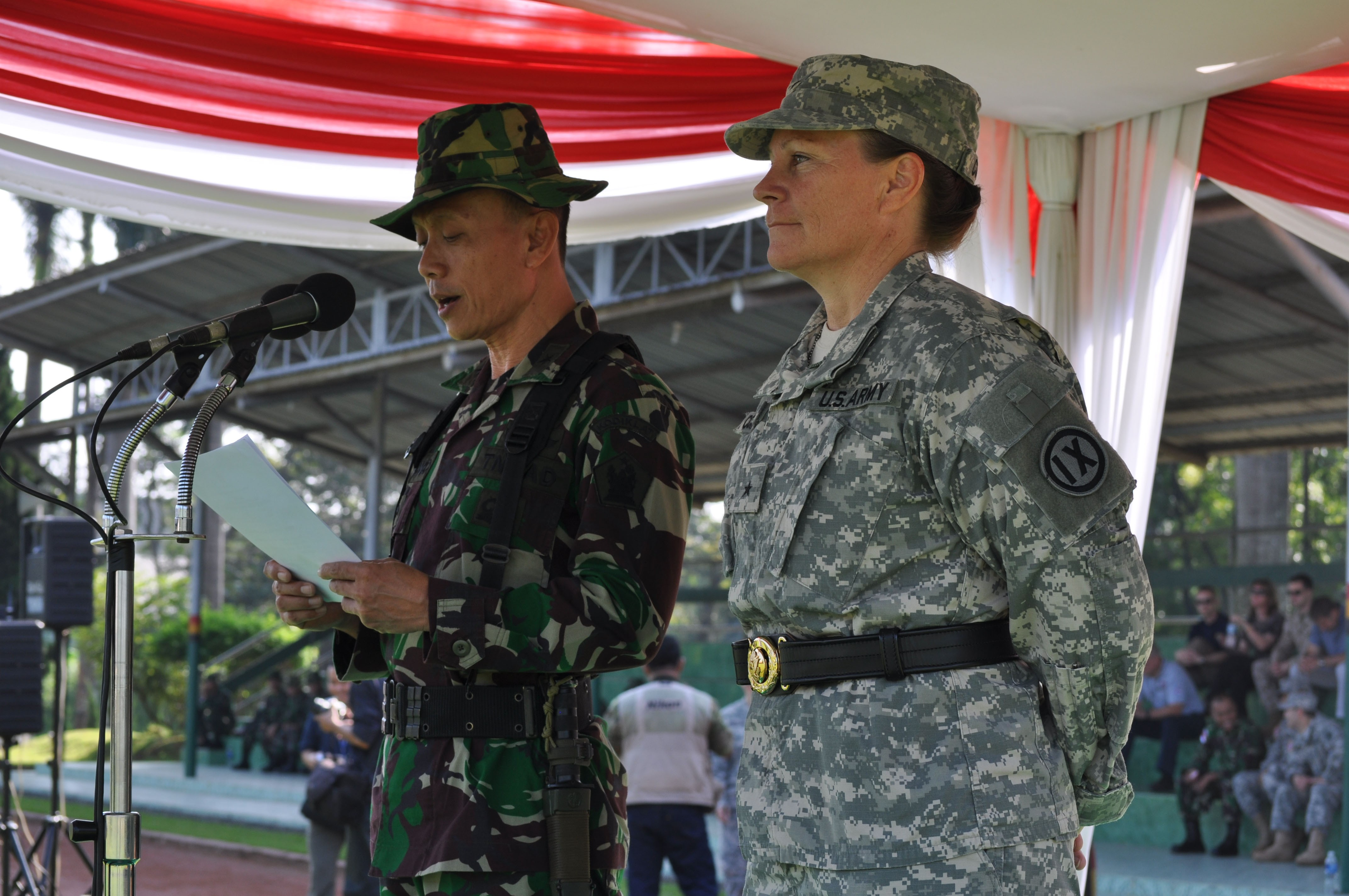
Brig. Gen. Michele G. Compton, the commanding general of the 9th Mission Support Command, and Brig. Gen. Mulyono, the training director for the Indonesian Army Training and Doctrine Command giving opening speech during Garuda Shield 2011.

Garuda Shield 2011 was returned to an annual bilateral exercise that focus on three main components: Command Post Exercise, Field Training Exercise, and humanitarian civic action project. The Opening ceremony of Garuda Shield 2011 was carried out on 10 June 2011, at the Engineer Training Center of Army Education and Training Command, Pusdikzi, Bogor, West Java.

During the opening ceremony, Brig. Gen. Michele G. Compton, the commanding general of the 9th MSC, welcomed the troops and described the importance of the regionally significant training event.

“Garuda Shield is an opportunity for the Indonesian Army and the United States Army to come together in a learning environment to share experiences and lessons learned with each other. Of equal importance during this exercise, is the opportunity to form and maintain close friendships and also to gain an enduring appreciation of each other’s customs,” said Compton.

The 12-day training, which was attended by 631 TNI AD personnel and 141 personnel from USARPAC, aims to improve interoperability among trainees and prepare capacity building facilities for UN troop-sending countries. Director of Training of the Indonesian Army Doctrine, Education and Training Development Command (Kodiklat TNI-AD) Brig. Gen. Mulyono said the joint military exercise between the two countries was conducted to place the cooperation in the United Nations peace-keeping operation on a solid footing. He said the regular annual exercise this year in Bogor involved Indonesian Ground Force and United States Army Pacific, an Army Service Component Command of the United States Army and is the army component unit of the United States Pacific Command.

"Such an exercise is the fifth of its kind because Indonesia is frequently involved in UN peace-keeping missions," Mulyono said.

He added that the "Garuda Shield" exercise in general was intended to step up the relations between the two countries` ground forces.

"The joint exercise with the US is of great advantage in the face of peace-keeping operation dynamics, and the way how to integrate the system of training in Indonesia and the United States," Mulyono said. Garuda Shield 2011 concluded on 22 June 2011.

=== Garuda Shield 2012 ===
The opening ceremony of Garuda Shield 2012 between the Indonesian Army (TNI AD) and the United States Army Pacific (USARPAC) was held at the Kostrad 2nd Infantry Division Headquarters in Singosari, Malang Regency, East Java, Monday, 11 June 2012, led by Lt. Gen. M. Munir, Commander of Kostrad accompanied by Brig. Gen. Gary M. Hara, Commander of Hawaii Army National Guard.

The joint exercise, said Lieutenant General TNI M Munir, involved 456 Indonesian Army personnel and 104 USARPAC personnel. The activities that will be carried out include the command post exercise which will be held at the Rindam Brawijaya PLDC and the field training exercise which will be held in the training area in Rindam V Brawijaya Sidodadi Lawang, Malang, and Karya Bhakti (ENCAP) which will be held in Purwosari, Pasuruan.

U.S. Army Reserve Soldiers with the 871st Engineer Company, 411th Engineer Battalion, headquartered in Hilo, Hawaii, and their counterparts with the Tentara National Indonesia Angkatan Darat, or TNI-AD, are accomplishing both tasks as they work side by side to build a community center in Malang, Indonesia, as part of Garuda Shield 2012.

In its sixth year, Garuda Shield is a combined exercise between the TNI-AD and U.S. Army that improves peacekeeping, stability operations and increases the disaster relief capabilities of both armies. A major part of the exercise is the community center construction project, as well as a sister project to renovate a family welfare center in the same part of Malang.

Garuda Shield 2012 concluded on 22 June 2012.

=== Garuda Shield 2013 ===
On 10 June 2013, the Indonesian Army and United States Army held the opening ceremony of Garuda Shield 2013 at the Kostrad 1st Infantry Division Headquarters in Depok, West Java, Indonesia. The Honorable Scot Marciel, U.S. Ambassador to the Republic of Indonesia, and exercise co-directors Maj. Gen. Gary M. Hara, Deputy Commanding General for the Army National Guard, U.S. Army Pacific (USARPAC) and Maj. Gen. Daniel Ambat, Kostrad 1st Division Commander, spoke at the ceremony.

Garuda Shield 2013 lasted for 12 days, from 10 to 21 June 2013. Deputy Commanding General of the U.S. Army National Guard in the Pacific (USARPAC), Gary M Hara, said 312 U.S. Army personnel participated in the exercise. Meanwhile, 300 personnel from Indonesia. The exercise includes planning and executing a combined brigade-level command post exercise based on a United Nations (U.N.) scenario and a field-training exercise based on a rescue operation scenario. The exercise involved troops from U.S. Army Pacific (USARPAC); the Indonesian Army National Army (TNI-AD), Kostrad 1st Division; 1st Battalion, 504th Parachute Infantry Regiment, 82nd Airborne Division; and the Indonesian Army, 17th Airborne Brigade.

Along with a series of parachute jumps, about 500 paratroopers of both nations conducted infantry training and operations during the exercise. The exercise focused on developing the respective militaries' ability to contribute to U.N. peace support operations, and on strengthening the nations' growing military relationships.

=== Garuda Shield 2014 ===
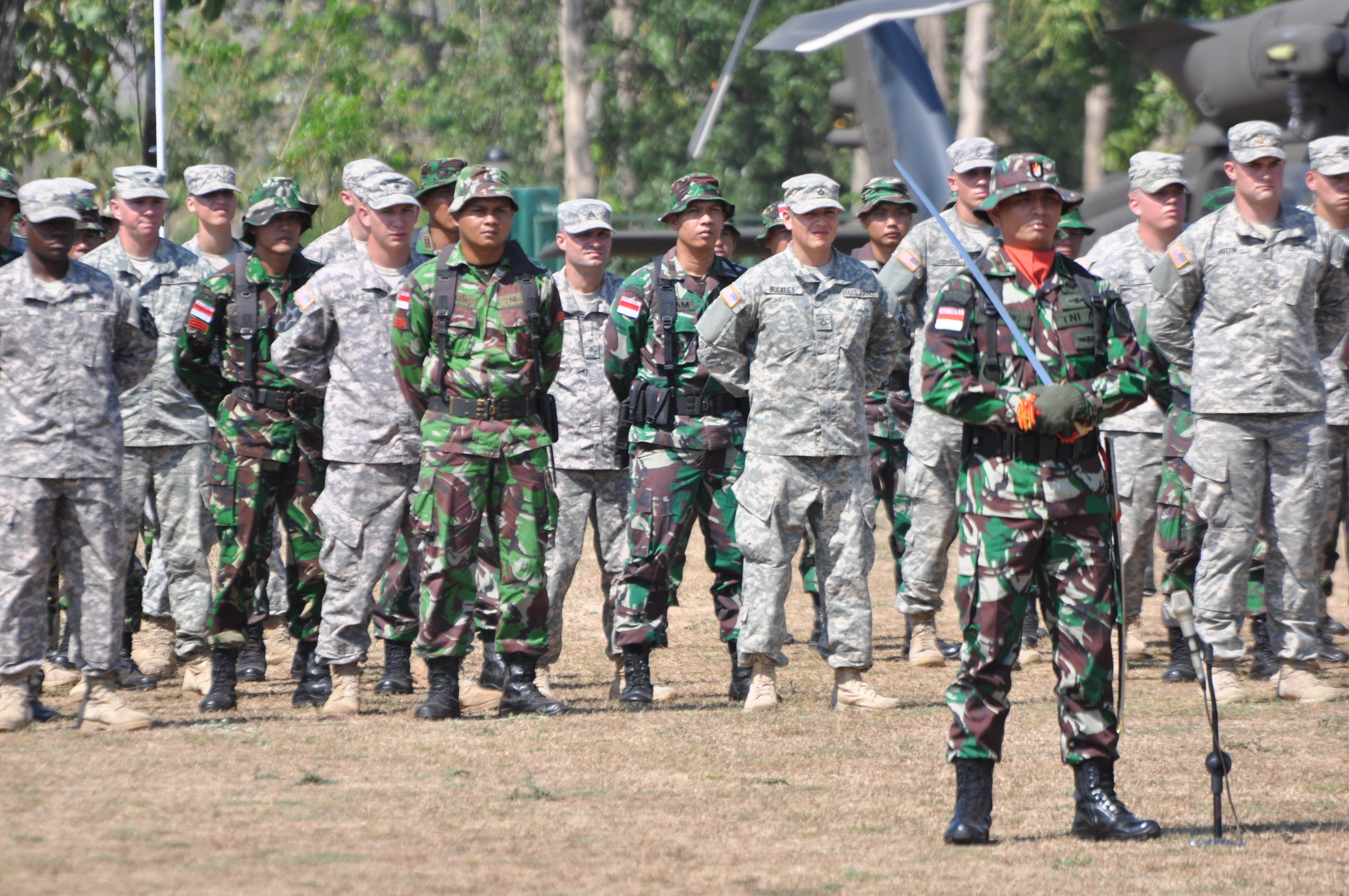
The Opening Ceremony of Garuda Shield 2014, 1 September 2014.

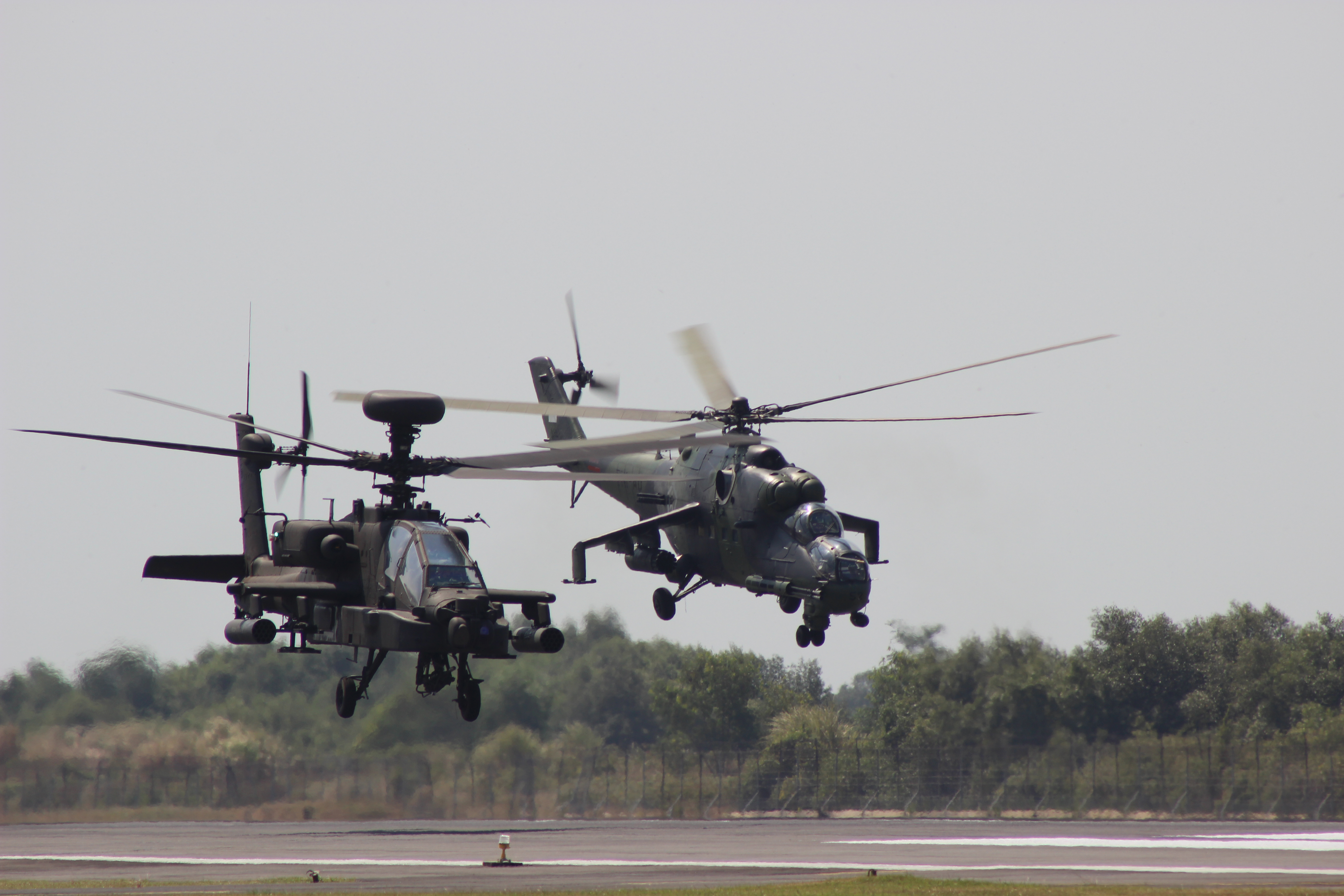
U.S Army AH-64E Apache Guardian and Indonesian Army Mi-35 Attack Helicopter during Garuda Shield 2014, 9 September 2014.

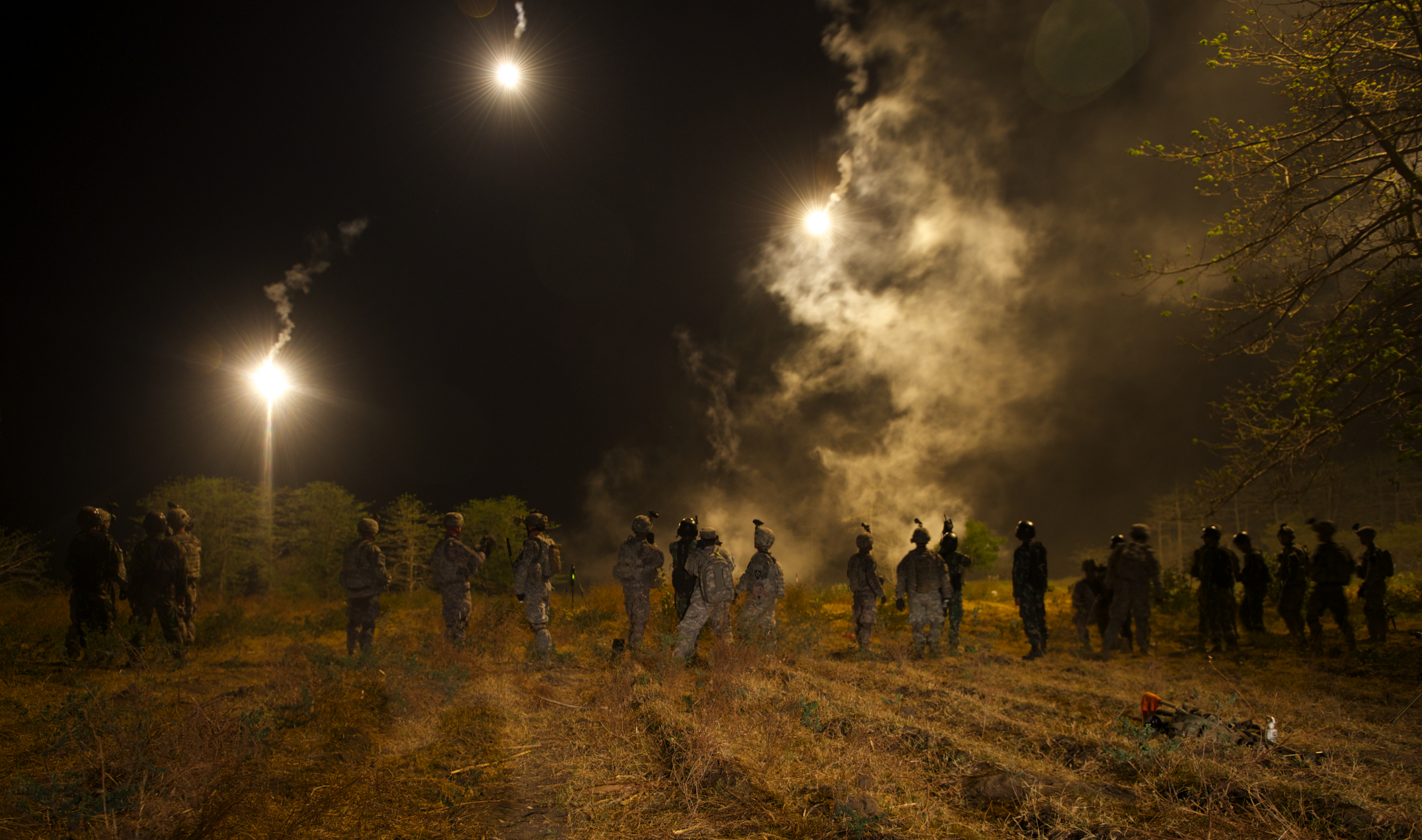
U.S and Indonesian Army carried out mortar exercise during Garuda Shield 2014, 19 September 2014.

The opening ceremony of the 2014 Garuda Shield training exercise was held on 1 September 2014 at Dodiklatpur Rindam V/BRW Asembagus, Situbondo, East Java, led by Indonesian Army Maj. Gen. Bambang Hariyanto, commander, 2nd Infantry Division, Kostrad and Lt. Gen. Stephen Lanza, commander, U.S. Army, I Corps.

This joint exercise was held for 1 month starting from 1 to 30 September 2014 at the Combat Training Education Depot (Dodiklatpur) Rindam V/Brawijaya and the Marine Combat Training Center (Puslatmar), Situbondo. This exercise also attended by Commanding General, U.S. Army Pacific Gen. Vincent K.Brooks.

Approximately 1,055 personnel consisting of 619 Kostrad soldiers under the leadership of Colonel Inf. Agung Pambudi (Danbrigif 6/2/K) as the Exercise Commander; and 436 soldiers from the U.S. Army Pacific (USARPAC) under the leadership of Brigadier General Lewinz.

Soldiers from the 2nd Brigade, 2nd Infantry Division based in Washington State, the 29th Infantry Brigade Combat Team, Hawaii Army National Guard, and the 25th Combat Aviation Brigade, 25th Infantry Division with Indonesian Army soldiers from the 2nd Kostrad Infantry Division carried out a month long exercise to foster cooperation and understanding.

Garuda Shield 2014 joint exercise consists of Command Training Operation Exercise, Command Post Exercise, Jungle Field Training Exercise, combat vehicle and aviation training, Combined Arms Fire Exercise, Medical, as well as social service activities.

=== Garuda Shield 2015 ===
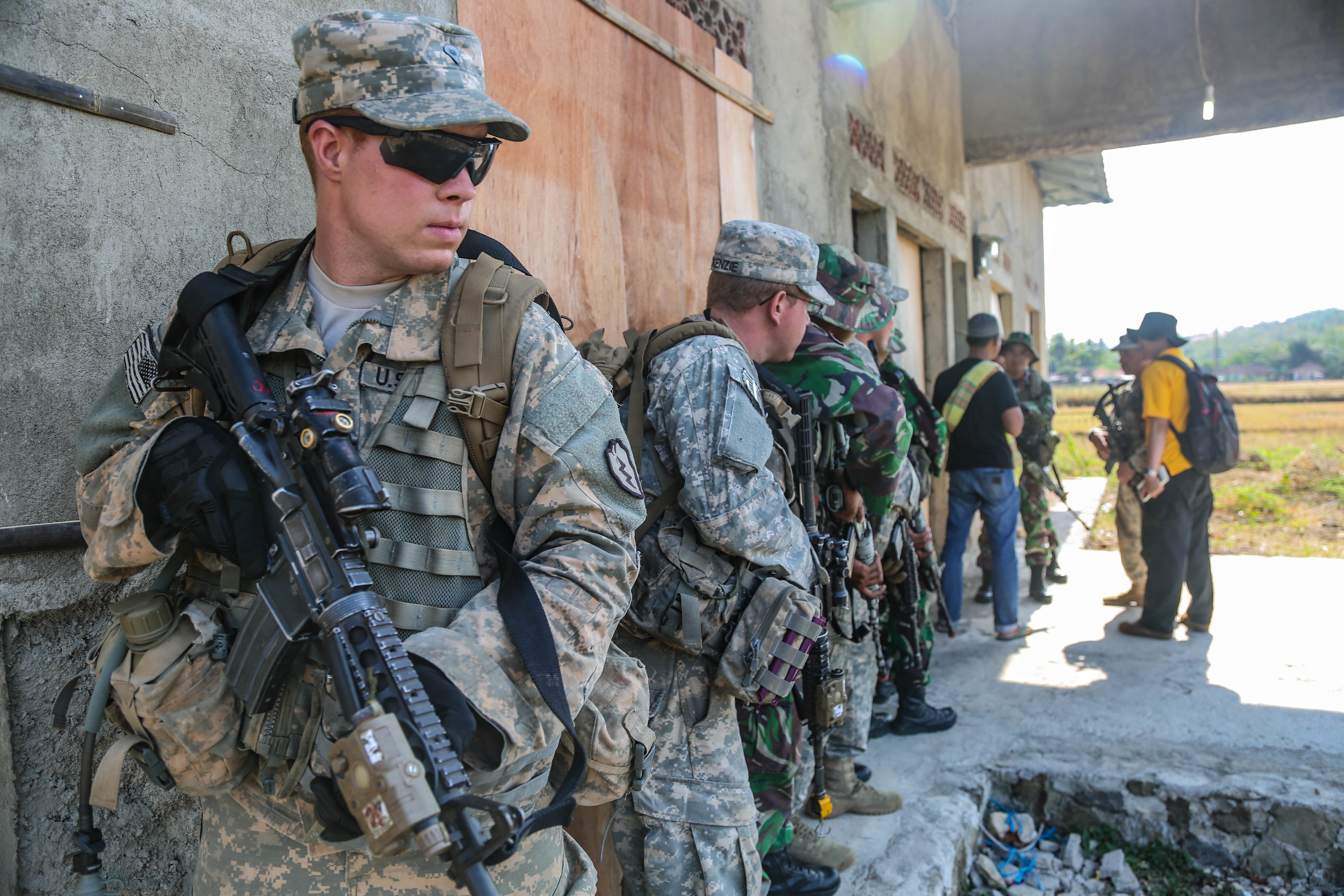
U.S. Army soldiers from Bravo Company 2-27th Infantry Regiment 3rd Infantry Brigade 25th Infantry Division, alongside Indonesian Army soldiers from 1st Infantry Division of Kostrad carry out Military Operations in Urban Terrain during Garuda Shield 2015 at Cibenda, West Java, Indonesia, on 21 August 2015.

Joint Exercise Garuda Shield 2015 between the Indonesian Army and the United States Army officially began and was opened in a military ceremony at the Kostrad Training Area, Gunung Sentul, Sukabumi, 20 August 2015. Acting as the Inspector of the Ceremony was the Chief of Staff, 1st Infantry Division, Kostrad, Brigadier General Agus Suhardi and Deputy Commander of the 25th Infantry Division USARPAC Brig. General Gary Brito. The exercise also attended by Maj. General Edward F. Dorman III, commander, 8th Theater Sustainment Command for U.S. Army Pacific.

The Garuda Shield 2015 was carried out from 20 to 28 August 2015, involving 830 soldiers from both countries consisting of 380 Indonesian Army soldiers from the 328th Infantry Battalion (Yonif Linud-328/17/1), Kostrad 1st Infantry Division and 450 United States Army soldiers from the 25th Infantry Division for USARPAC. The exercise consist of Medical/Tactical Combat Casualty Care, Combat Patrol, marksmanship, Military Operations in Urban Terrain, Close Quarter Battle (CQB), Swamp Forest Patrol, and jungle and sea survival.

=== Garuda Shield 2016 ===
Joint Exercise Garuda Shield 2016 was held on 1 to 12 August 2016, attended by 481 joint military personnel from the Kostrad Raider Battalion and the U.S. Army Pacific at Asembagus Combat Training Center (Puslatpur), Situbondo, led by the Commander of 2nd Infantry Division Kostrad, Maj. Gen. Ganip Warsito and Commander of Hawaii Army National Guard Brigadier General Keith Tamashiro.

The joint training materials between the two countries include, Command Post Exercise, Field Training Exercise including Counter Improvised Explosive Device (C-IED) training, Medical Exercise and Aviation Exercise.

=== Garuda Shield 2017 ===
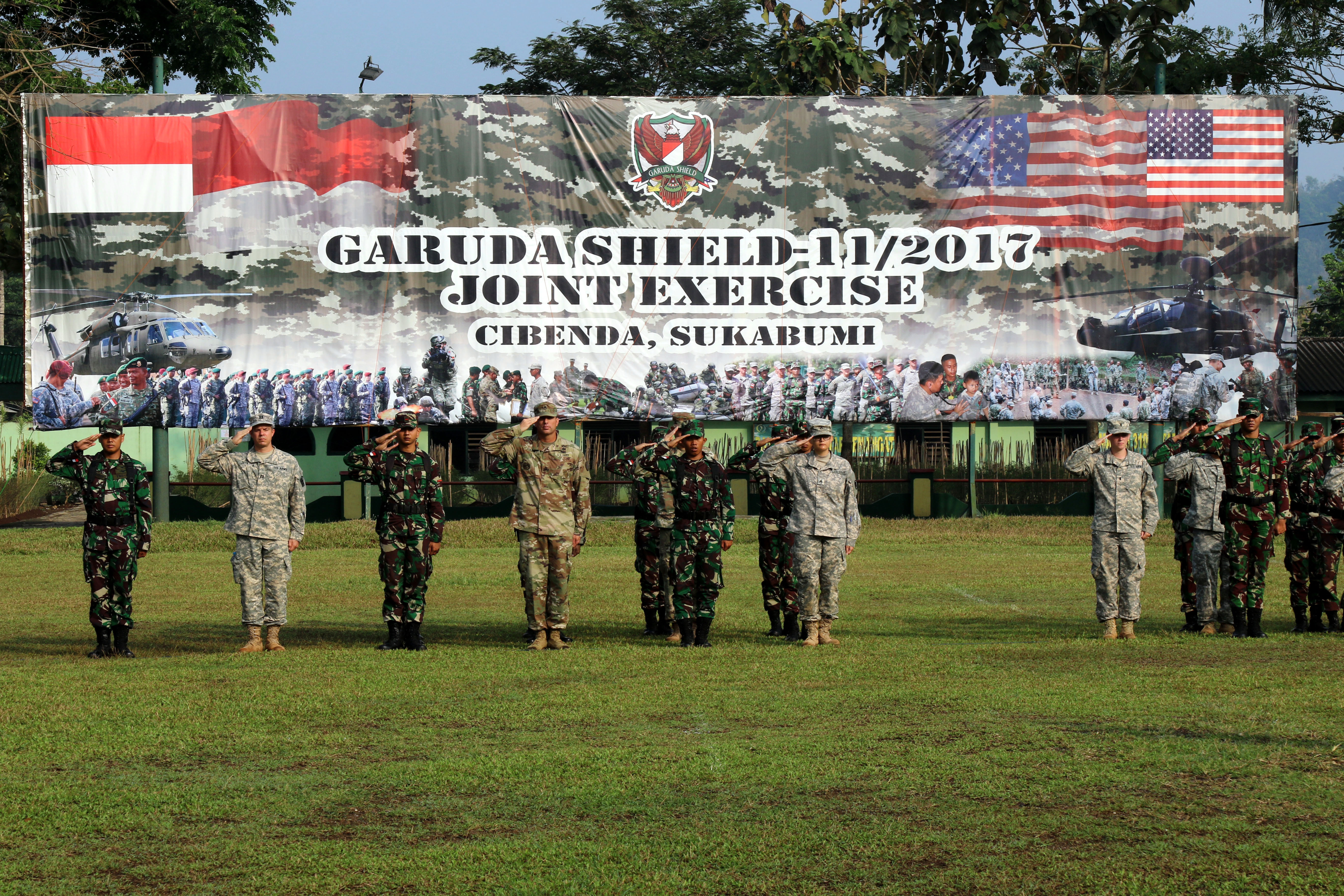
Garuda Shield 2017 Closing Ceremony, 29 September 2017.

The Indonesian Army and the United States Army held the Garuda Shield 2017 in two different training locations, 310th Battalion Infantry Base (Mayonif 310/KK") Cikembar, and Kostrad Cibenda Training Area, Sukabumi, West Java, for 11 days from 18 to 29 September 2017. The exercise led by Maj. Gen. Arthur J. Logan, Hawaii Adjutant General and Brig. Gen. Joko Putranto, Chief of Staff, Kostrad 1st Infantry Division.

The exercise involved 732 personnel from the Indonesian Army from the 303rd Para Raider Infantry Battalion (Yonif 303/SSM), 13th Raider Infantry Brigade (Brigif 13/1) assigned to Kostrad 1st Infantry Division and Army Aviation (Penerbad), together with the US Army from the United States Army Pacific (USARPAC); and 103rd Infantry Division; and US Army Aviation.

The Garuda Shield 2017 joint exercise consists of an early entry aviation Subject Matter Expert Exchange (SMEE) and unmanned aerial surveillance SMEE, aviation live fire exercises (surface and littoral), a Command Post Exercise, Combined Tactical Operation Center, and an infantry company Field Training Exercise and Live Fire Exercise (LFX). The exercise involved helicopters from both countries, with the Indonesian Army deploying Mi-35, Mi-17, Bell and Bolcow combat helicopters; and the US Army deploying Blackhawk and Apache helicopters.

=== Garuda Shield 2018 ===
Indiana Army National Guardsmen from the 76th Infantry Brigade Combat Team, with Indonesian Army soldiers from the 9th Raider Infantry Brigade, assigned to Kostrad 2nd Infantry Division, held the Opening Ceremony of Garuda Shield 2018 at the Combat Training Center (Puslatpur), Situbondo, Indonesia, 29 July 2018.

Indonesian army Maj. Gen. Marga Taufiq, the commander of the Kostrad 2nd Infantry Division, also welcomed the Hawaii National Guard Adjutant General, Army Maj. Gen. Arthur J. Logan, as his co-host of the opening ceremony while emphasizing the shared respect between the partner armies.

The Garuda Shield 2018 joint exercise was held for 2 weeks, from 30 July 2018 until 10 August 2018, which included Command Training Operation Exercise, Command Post Exercise, Field Training Exercise, Aviation and Medical as well as Community Service activities.

=== Garuda Shield 2019 ===
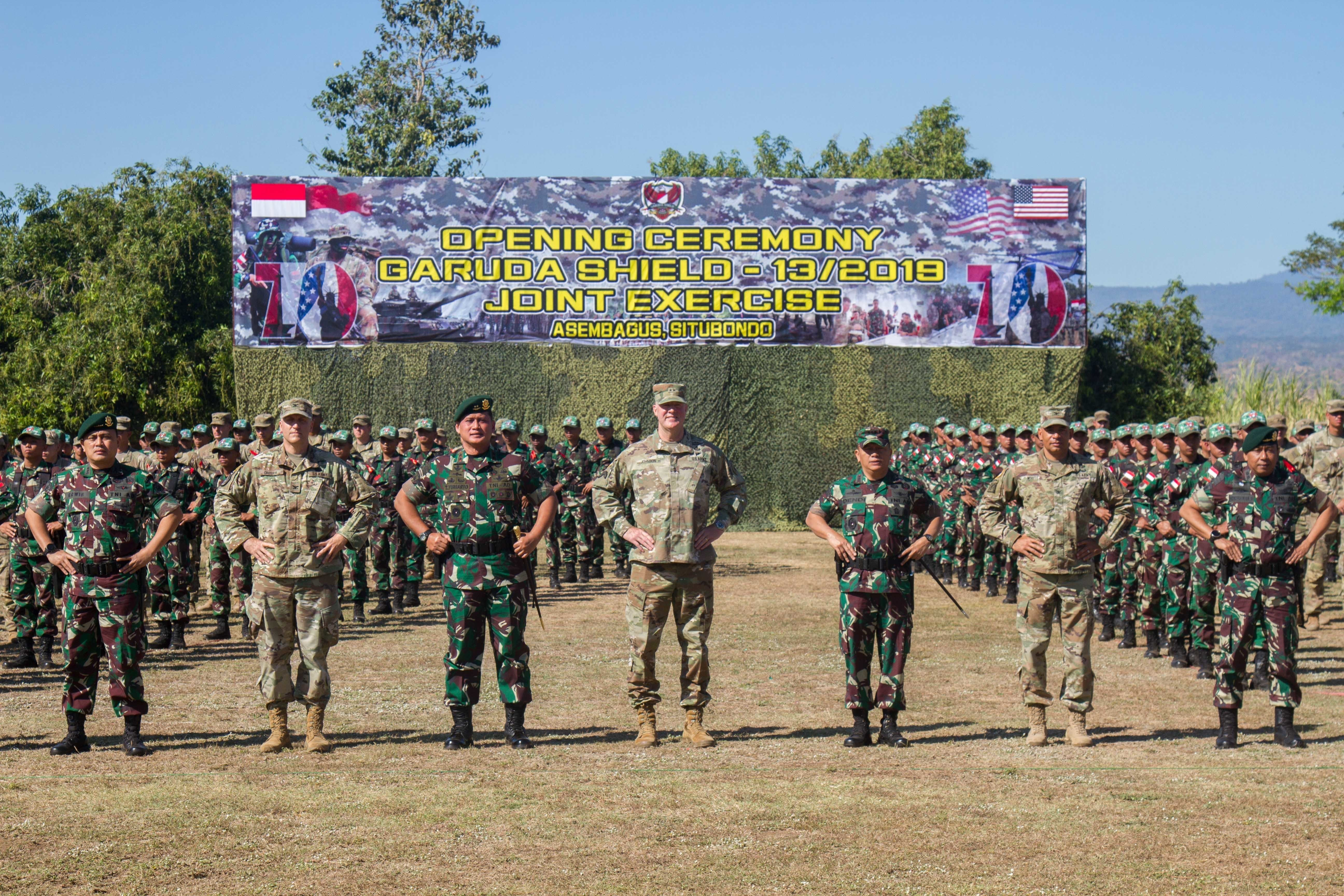
The 2019 Garuda Shield leaders from both armies pose for a picture with a formation of U.S. and Indonesian forces during the 2019 Garuda Shield opening ceremony 19 August 2019, at Dodiklatpur, Indonesia.

Indonesian Army soldiers from the 9th Raider Infantry Brigade, assigned to Kostrad 2nd Infantry Division, and the US Army from United States Army Pacific (USARPAC) held the Opening Ceremony of Garuda Shield 2019, led by Commander of Kostrad 2nd Infantry Division Maj. Gen. Tri Yuniarto and Deputy Commanding General for the United States Army Pacific Maj. Gen. Pete Johnson at Combat Training and Education Center (Dodiklatpur) Kodam V/Brw, Asembagus, Situbondo, Indonesia, 19 August 2019. The joint training was held for 12 days from 19 to 30 August 2019.

More than 700 U.S. Army personnel from 1st Battalion, 27th Infantry Regiment, 2nd Infantry Brigade Combat Team assigned to 25th Infantry Division; Hawaii, U.S. Army Pacific Command; Hawaii, 10th Support Group, Japan, I Corps, Washington, and U.S. Army National Guard from Michigan participated in Exercise Garuda Shield 19, making it not only one of the largest bilateral training exercises in the Indo-Pacific region but a true total force representation of the U.S. Army.

=== Garuda Shield 2020 ===
Garuda Shield 2020 (GS-14/2020) was opened in 9 September 2020. This exercise focuses on MDMP (Military Decision-Making Process) exercises, through conference (Indoor / computer simulation class). This exercise is limited due to COVID-19 pandemic.

=== Garuda Shield 2021 ===
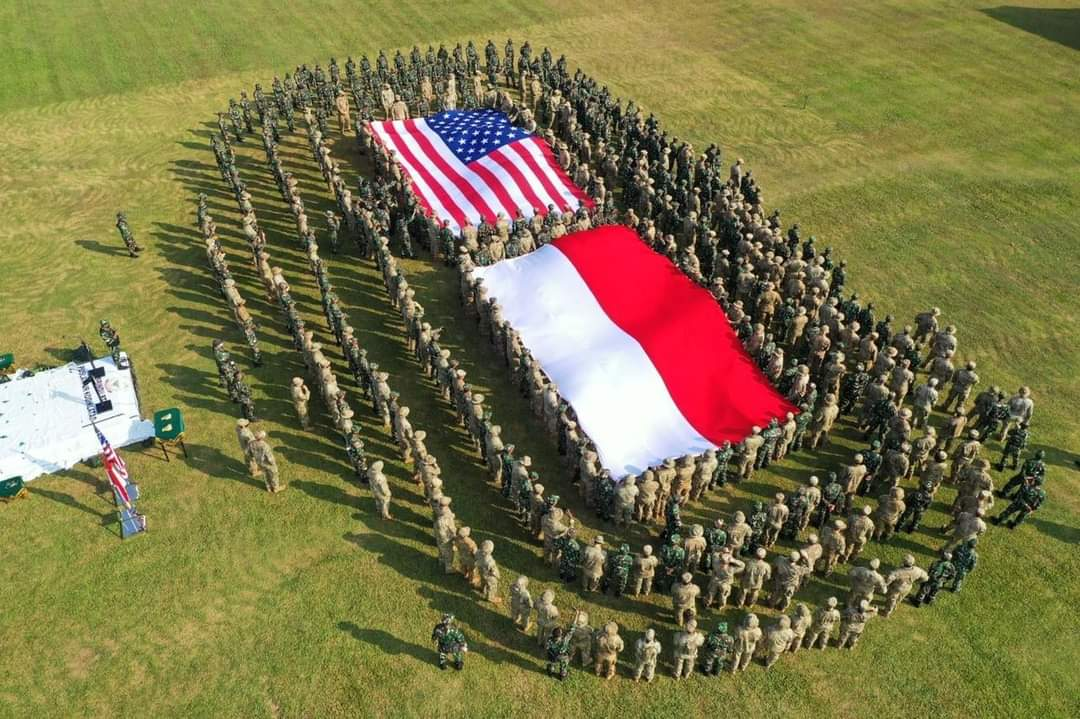
Garuda Shield 2021 opening ceremony at Baturaja, South Sumatra, 6 August 2021.

The Opening Ceremony of Garuda Shield 2021 was held on 4 August 2021, and was attended by the Commanding General of the United States Army Pacific (USARPAC), General Charles A. Flynn, and the Chief of Staff of the Indonesian Army, General Andika Perkasa at the Army Kodiklat (Combat Training Center), Baturaja, Ogan Komering Ulu, South Sumatra.

The Garuda Shield 2021 joint exercise took place from 4 to 14 August 2021, with 2,161 Indonesian Army soldiers and 1,547 United States soldiers participating. A number of materials were implemented in this exercise, including: Staff Exercise, Field Training Exercise, Live Fire Exercise, Aviation and Medical Exercise (Medex) and two training programs that will be combined, namely Joint Combined Exchange Training and Garuda Airborne.

== Super Garuda Shield 2022 ==
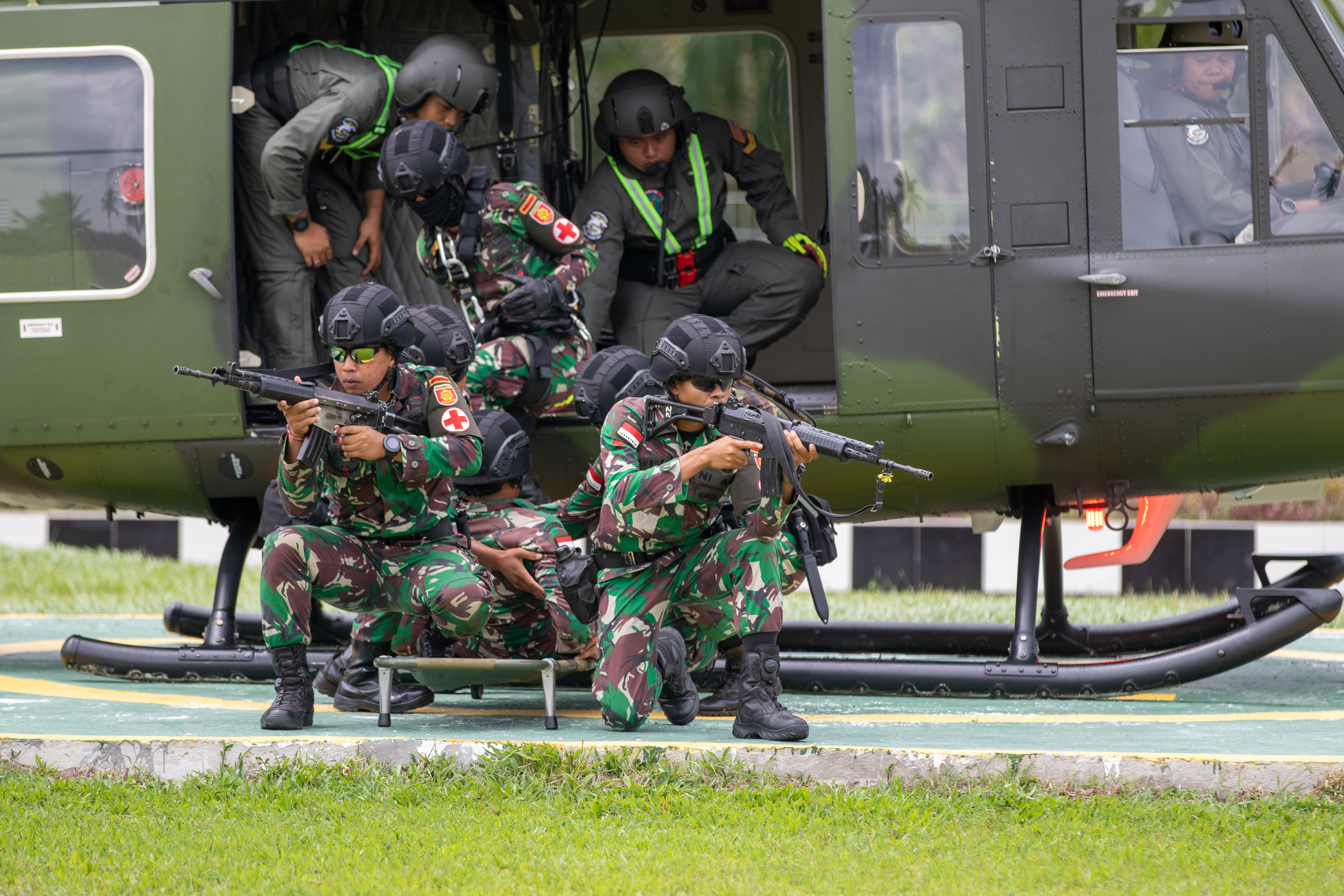
Indonesian Soldiers conduct live hoist training during Exercise Super Garuda Shield 2022 at Baturaja, Indonesia on 1 August 2022.

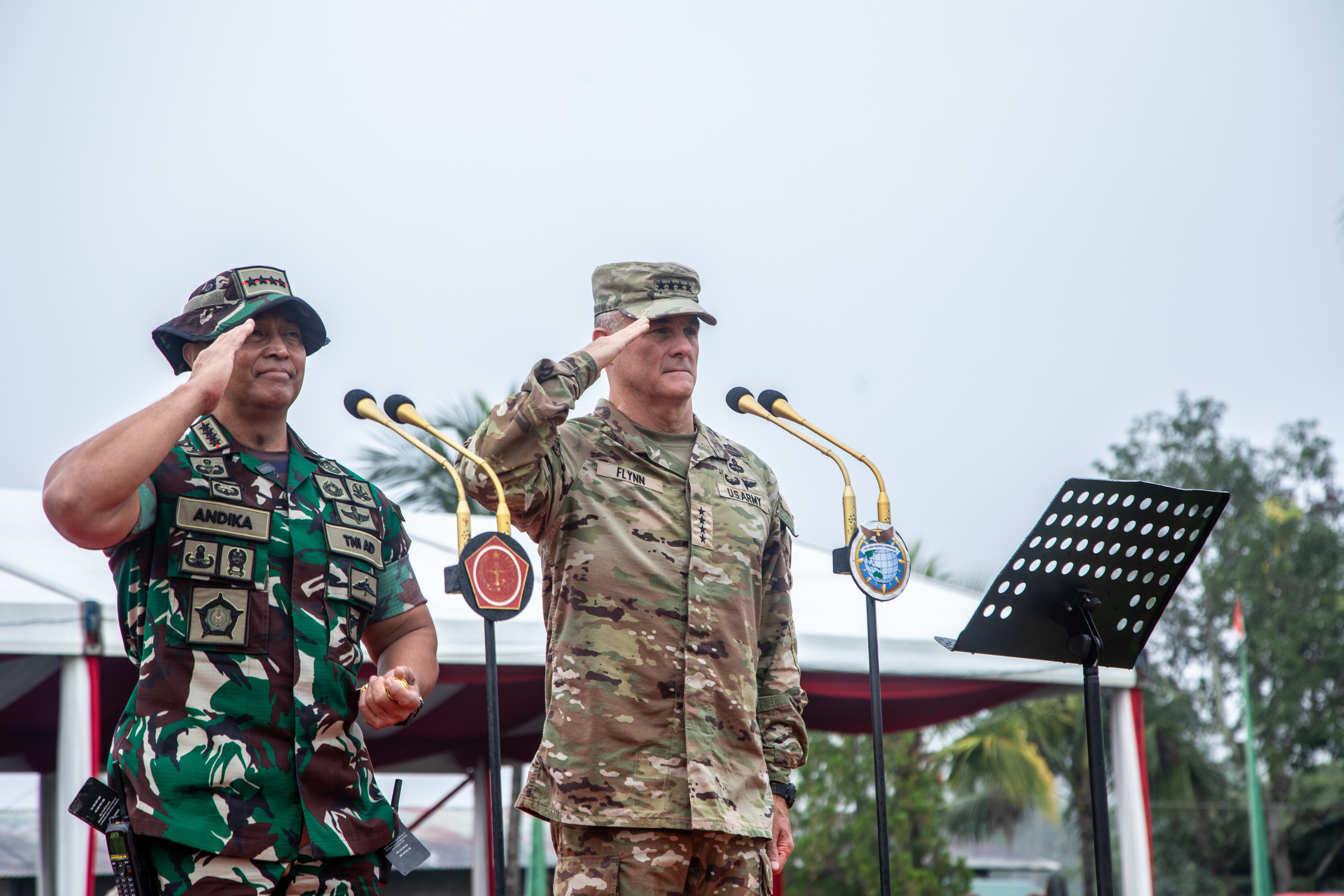
Gen. Andika Perkasa, Commander in Chief of the Indonesian National Armed Forces and Gen. Charles Flynn, Commanding General of the U.S. Army Pacific salutes the formation of troops during the opening ceremony of Super Garuda Shield 2022, Baturaja, Indonesia, 3 August 2022.

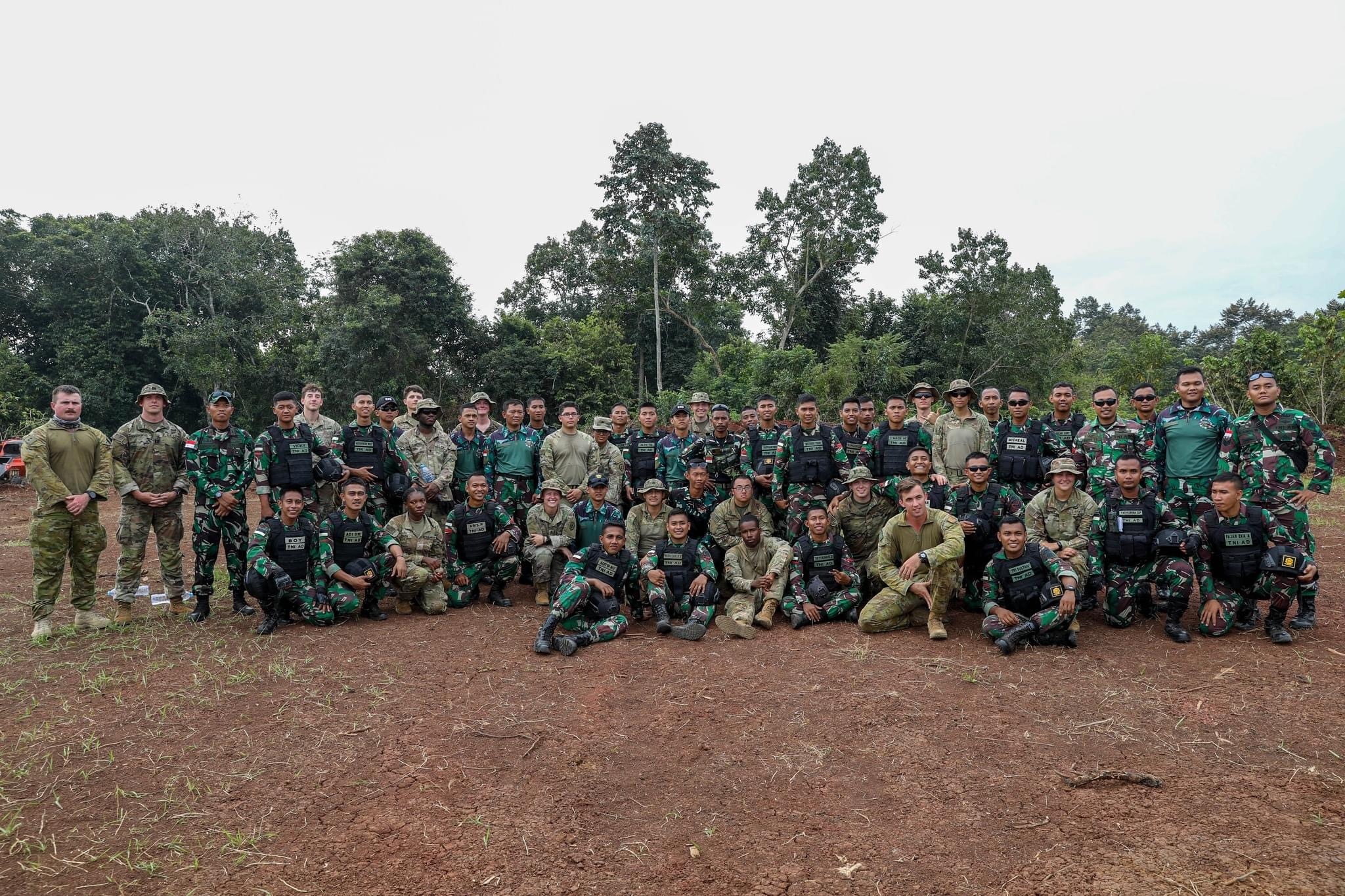
Soldiers from Australian Defense Force joined the Super Garuda Shield multinational exercise for the first time, 5 August 2022.

In April 2022, a new Garuda Shield joint-exercise was announced, which involved 14 countries, making it the largest edition of Garuda Shield by participants since it was established.

The Opening Ceremony of Super Garuda Shield 2022 held on 3 August 2022, attended by the Commanding General of the U.S. Army Pacific, General Charles Flynn, and the Commander of the Indonesian National Armed Forces, General Andika Perkasa, at Baturaja Combat Training Center (Puslatpur), South Sumatra, Indonesia.

The exercise was conducted from 3 to 14 August 2022 by more than 4,000 combined forces personnel, including first time participants Australia, Singapore, and Japan Ground Self Defense Force, are participating in support of the exercise. Other nations include Canada, France, India, Malaysia, New Zealand, the Republic of Korea, Papua New Guinea, Timor Leste, and the United Kingdom as Observer.

The exercise consisted Field Training Exercise, Medic Exercise, Combined Arms Life Fire Exercise, Counter-Improvised Explosive Devices, Ordnance Disposal, Aviation, and Subject Matter Expert Exchange. As well as Joint Exercises: Amphibious Exercise, Cooperative Deployment, Himars Rapid Infiltration/ Caesar Rapid Infiltration, Austere Airfield Ops and Airborne Operations.

Super Garuda Shield 2022 partnering nations
| Country | Role | Total service members (approx.) | Note and reference |
|---|---|---|---|
| Indonesia | Participant | 3,455 | |
| United States | Participant | 1,377 | |
| Japan | Participant | 110 | |
| Australia | Participant | 91 | |
| Singapore | Participant | 52 | |
| Canada | Observer | – | |
| France | Observer | – | |
| India | Observer | – | |
| Malaysia | Observer | – | |
| New Zealand | Observer | – | |
| South Korea | Observer | – | |
| Papua New Guinea | Observer | – | |
| Timor Leste | Observer | – | |
| United Kingdom | Observer | – | |

== Super Garuda Shield 2023 ==
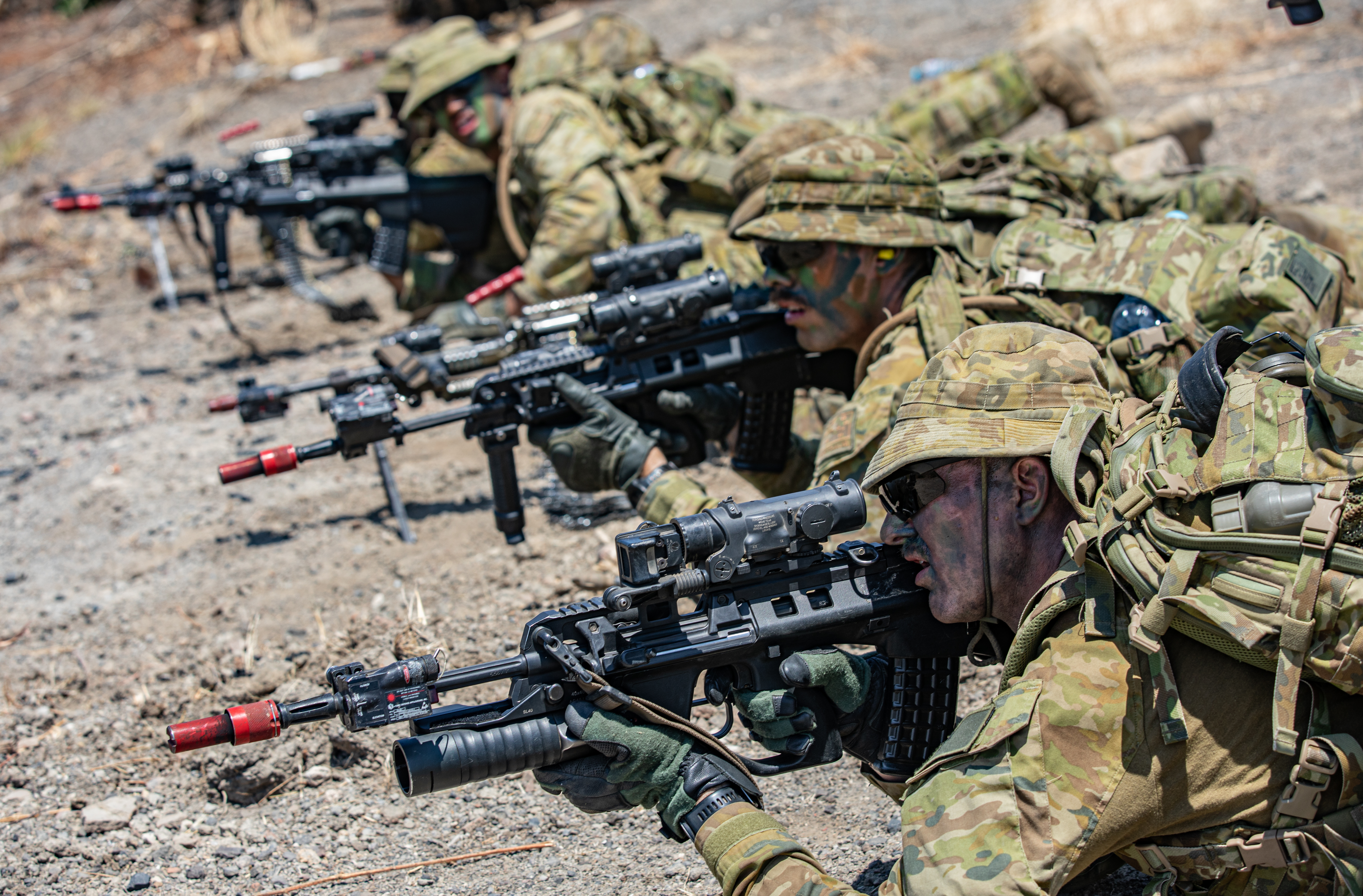
A group of Australian Defense Force Soldiers, engages the opposing force with their assigned weapons during a Field Training Exercise during Exercise Super Garuda Shield 2023, 6 September 2023.

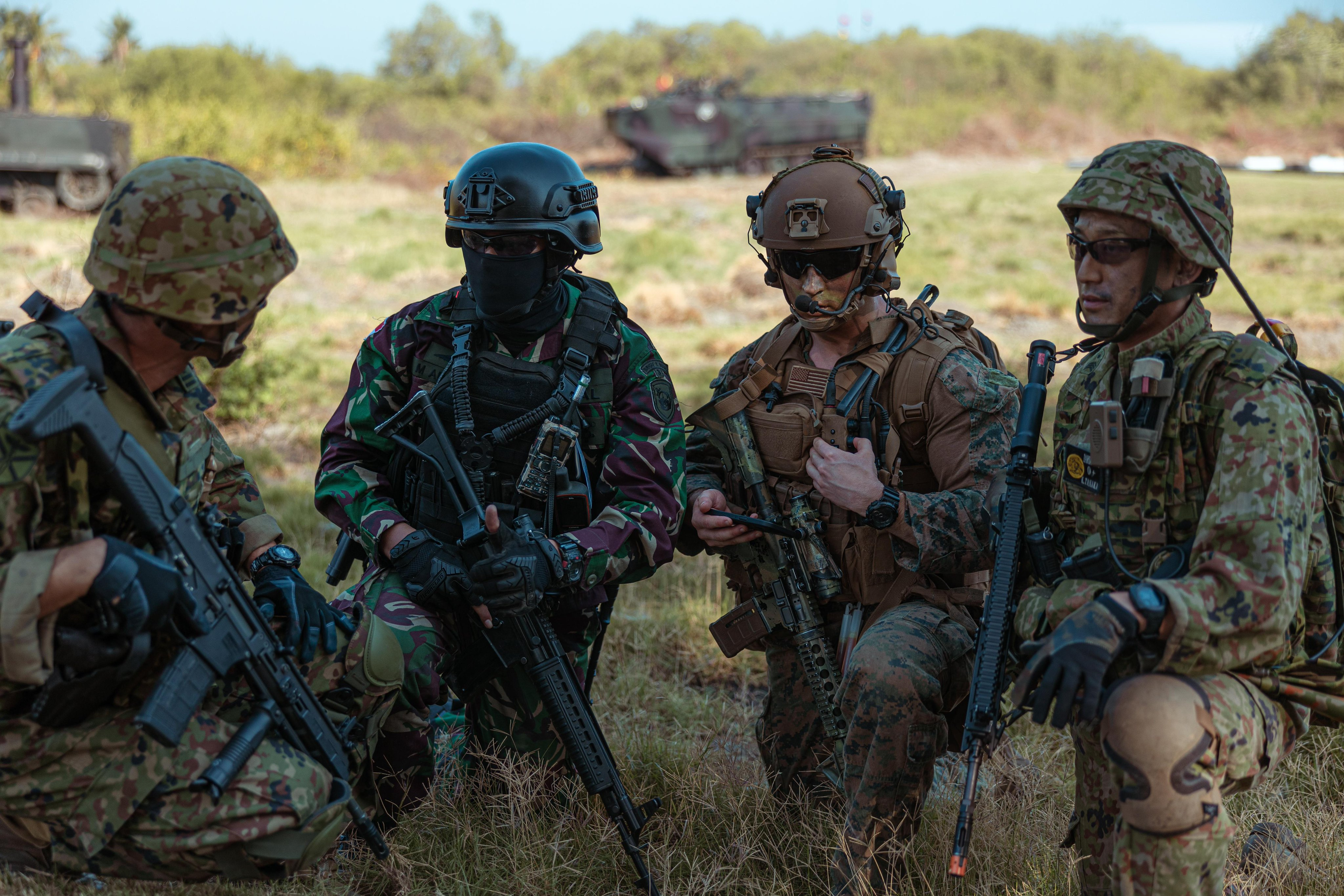
Soldiers from U.S. Marine Corps, Japan Ground Self-Defense Force, and Indonesian Marine Corps during amphibious assault in Super Garuda Shield 2023, 10 September 2023.

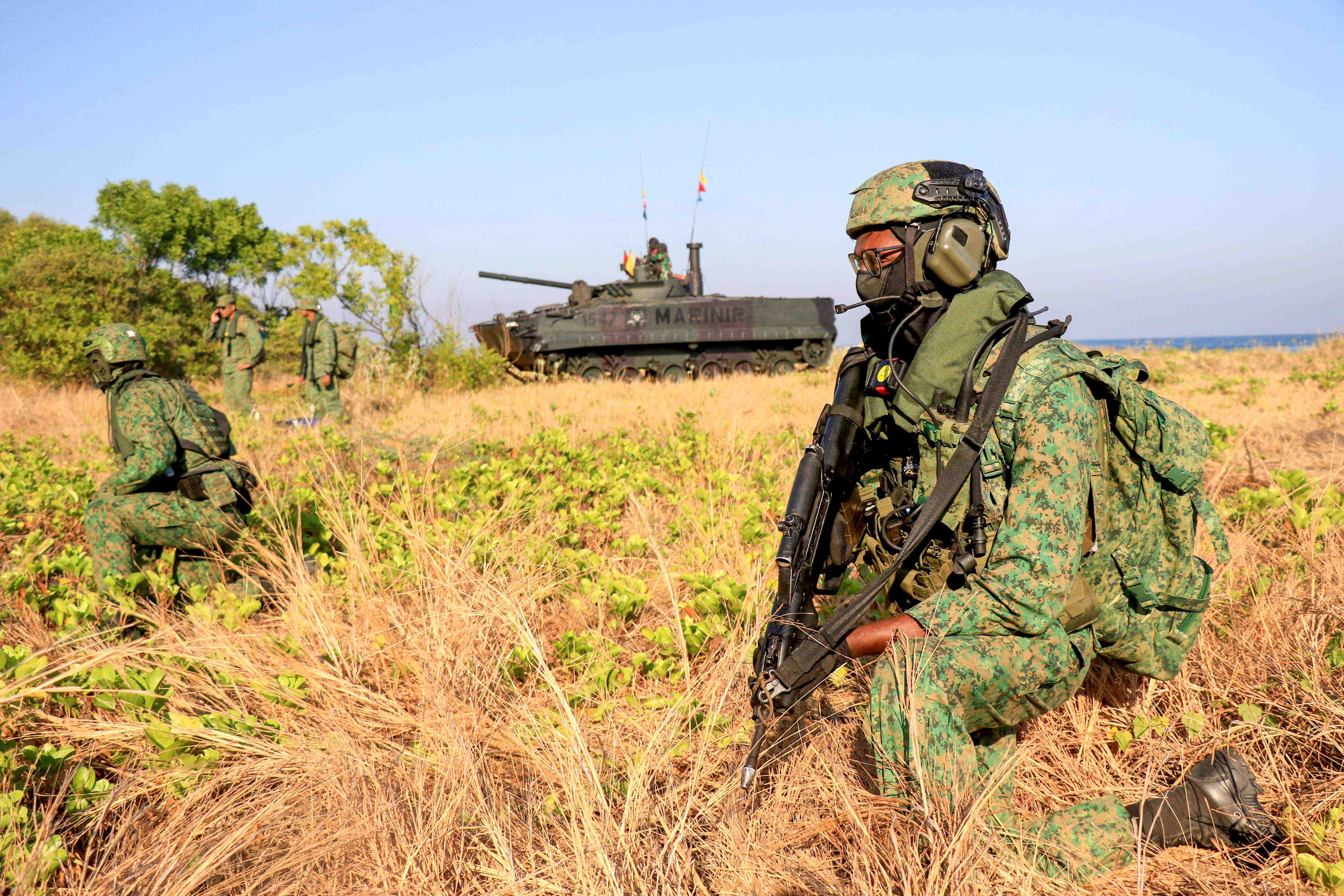
Singapore Armed Forces (SAF) soldiers carried out an amphibious landing using LVT-7 during the Super Garuda Shield (SGS) 2023 Joint Exercise at Banongan Beach, 5th Marine Combat Training Center (Puslatpurmar) Baluran, Situbondo, East Java, Sunday, 10 September 2023.

On 31 August 2023, Super Garuda Shield 2023 launched at Warships Training Center (Puslatkaprang), 2nd Fleet Command (Koarmada II), Surabaya, East Java led by Commodore Edi Haryanto, Commander of the Naval Battle Group, 2nd Fleet Command and U.S. Maj. General Jered P. Helwig, Commanding General, 8th Theater Sustainment Command; and at 5th Combat Training Center (Puslatpur 5), Baluran, Situbondo, East Java, attended by Admiral Yudo Margono, Commander of the Indonesian National Armed Forces and Lt. Gen. Xavier Brunson, Commanding General of the U.S. Army’s I Corps. Staff exercises between the US, Indonesia, the UK, and Australia were also held in addition to the regular exercises.

The exercise was conducted from 31 August to 13 September 2023 by more than 5,000 combined forces personnel from seven nations participating in support of the exercise, and other twelve nations as the Observers.

The exercise consisted Subject Matter Expert Exchange (SMEE) and engineering project (ENCAP); Joint Staff Exercise; Joint Field Training Exercise (FTX): Jungle FTX, Military Operations in Urban Terrain (MOUT), Maritime Operation, Airborne Assault, Special Operation; Austere Airfield; HIRAIN/C-RAIN; Amphibious Assault; and Combined Arms Live Fire Exercise (CALFEX).

Super Garuda Shield 2023 partnering nations
| Country | Role | Total service members (approx.) | Note and reference |
|---|---|---|---|
| Indonesia | Participant | 2,810 | |
| United States | Participant | 2,100 | |
| Singapore | Participant | 214 | |
| Australia | Participant | 125 | |
| Japan | Participant | 100 | |
| United Kingdom | Participant | – | |
| France | Participant | – | |
| Brunei Darussalam | Observer | – | |
| Brazil | Observer | – | |
| Canada | Observer | – | |
| Germany | Observer | – | |
| India | Observer | – | |
| Malaysia | Observer | – | |
| Netherlands | Observer | – | |
| New Zealand | Observer | – | |
| Papua New Guinea | Observer | – | |
| Philippines | Observer | – | |
| South Korea | Observer | – | |
| Timor Leste | Observer | – | |

== Super Garuda Shield 2024 ==
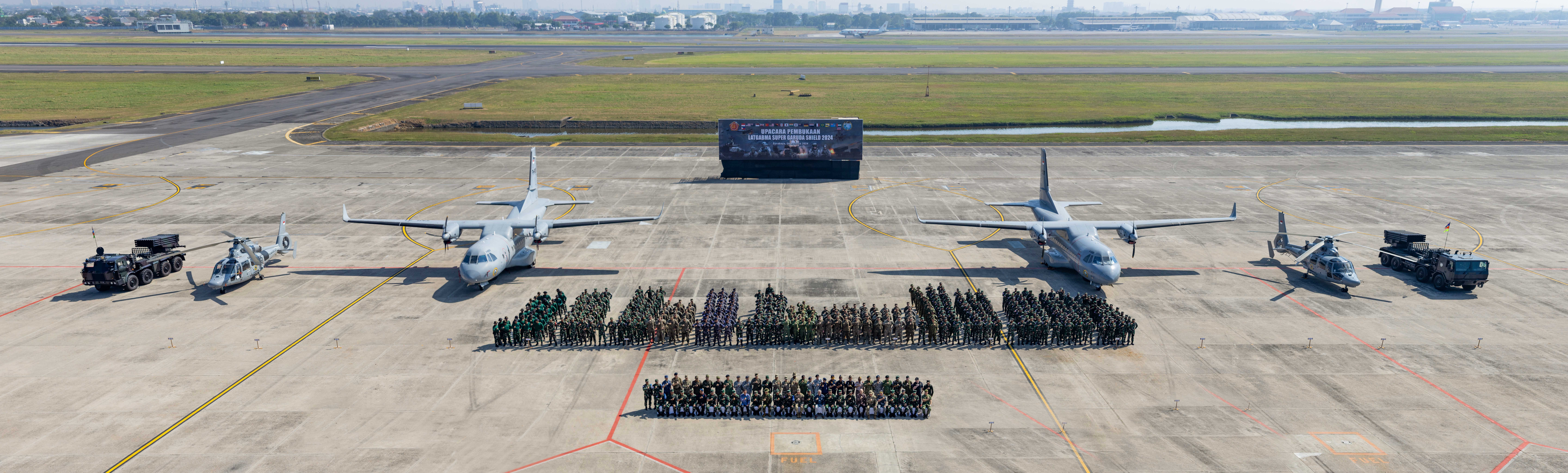
Multinational service members pose for a group photo following the opening ceremony of Super Garuda Shield 2024 at Juanda International Airport, East Java, Indonesia, 26 August 2024.

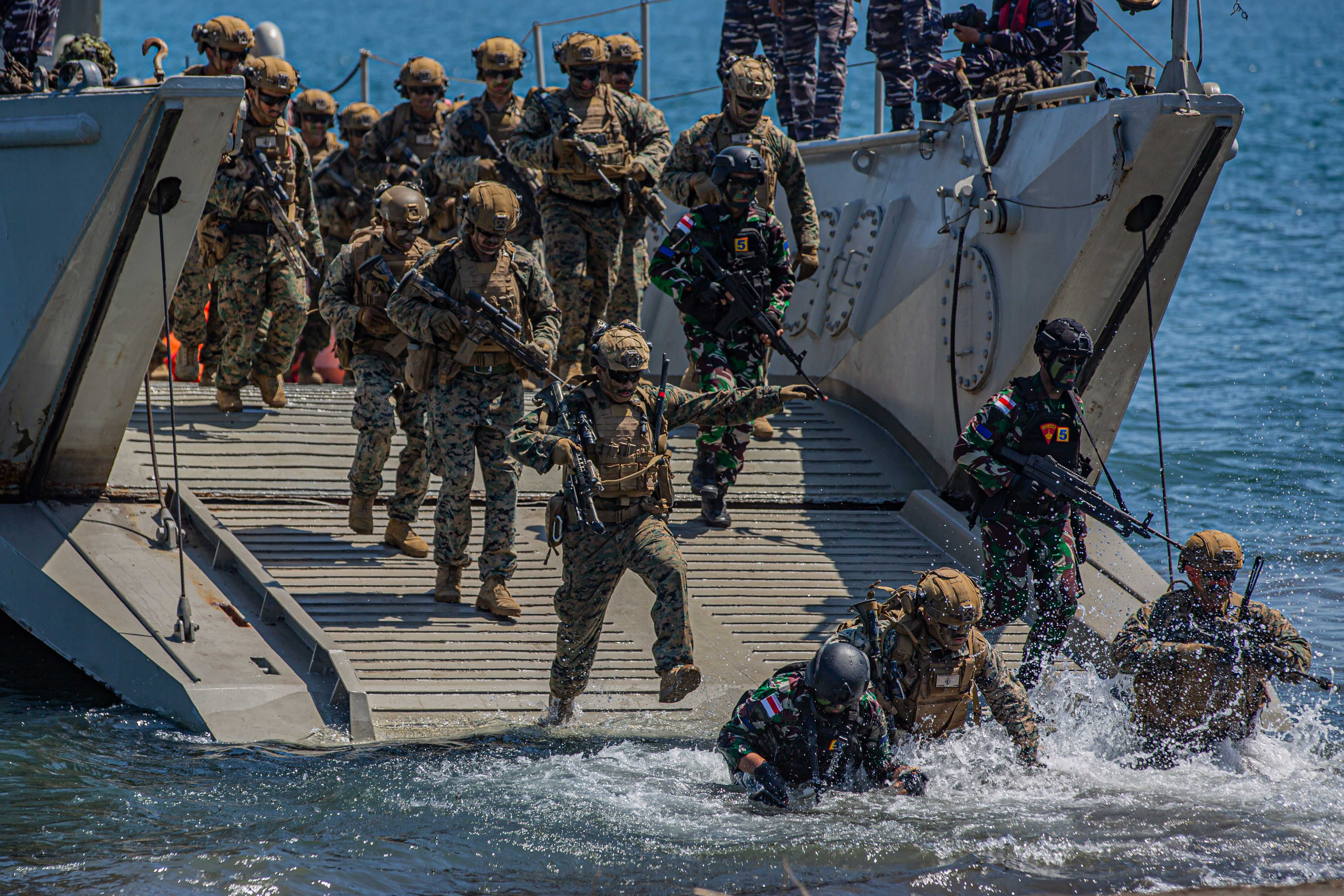
U.S. Marine and Indonesian Marine participate in an Amphibious Assault exercise as part of Super Garuda Shield 2024 near Banongan, Indonesia, 5 September 2024.

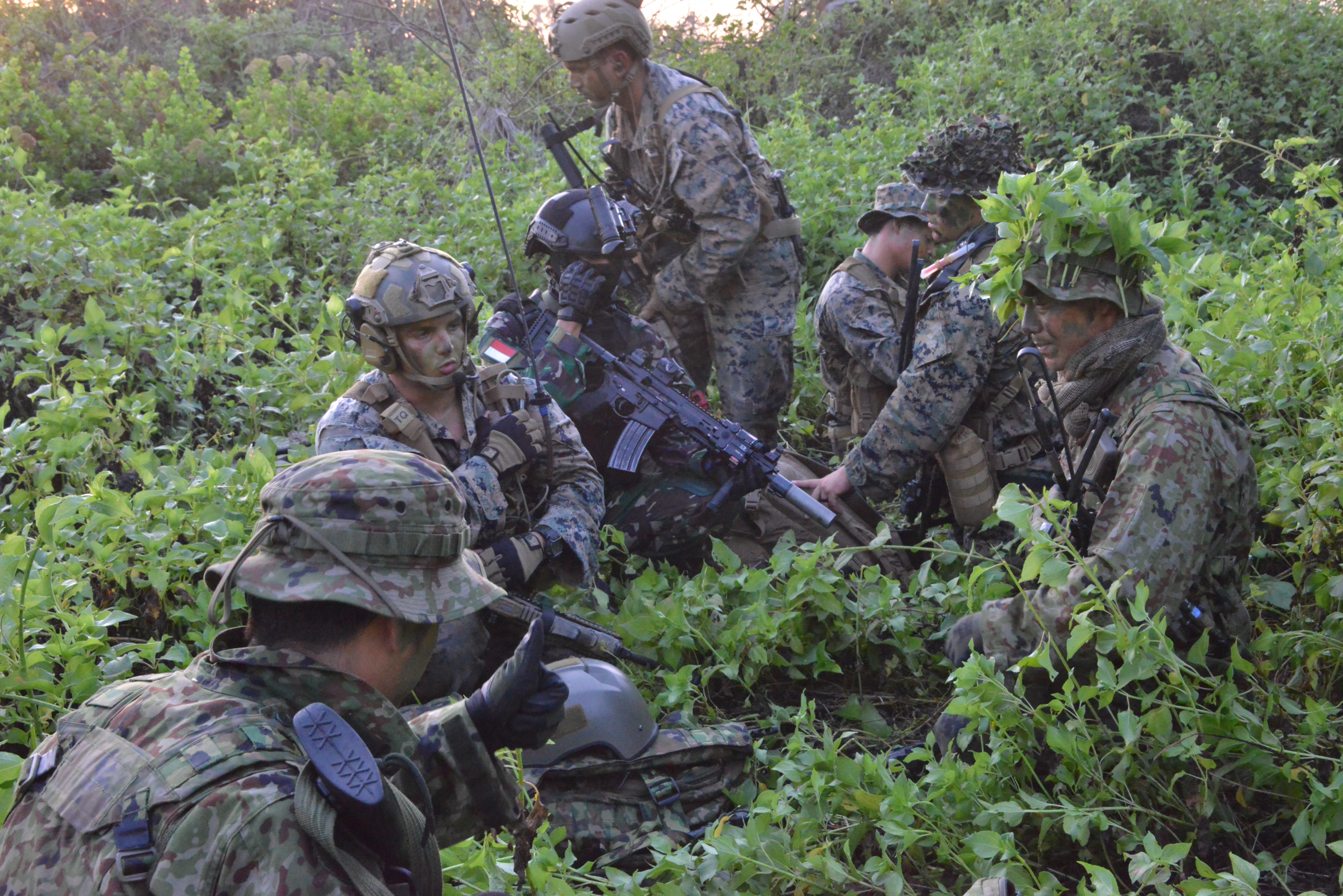
Soldiers from U.S. Marine Corps, Indonesian Marine Corps and Amphibious Rapid Deployment Brigade Reconnaissance Company of Japan Ground Self-Defense Force (JGSDF) carried out amphibious assault during Super Garuda Shield 2024.

United States and the Indonesian National Armed Forces officially kicked off the 2024 Super Garuda Shield exercise on 26 August 2024 with an opening ceremony at Indonesian military base on Juanda Naval Air Base, Surabaya, East Java, Indonesia.

The exercise attended by the Commander of the U.S. Indo-Pacific Command Admiral Samuel J. Paparo, Commander of the Indonesian National Armed Forces General Agus Subiyanto, and U.S. Ambassador to Indonesia Kamala S. Lakhdhir, including other senior government and military leaders.

Super Garuda Shield 2024 (SGS24) multinational exercise was held by partnering nations on 26 August 2024 – 6 September 2024, in three main locations: Situbondo, Karawang, and Baturaja. Service members from the United States, Indonesia, Australia, Canada, France, Japan, Singapore, South Korea, United Kingdom, and New Zealand participated in the exercise, including Observing nations from Brazil, Brunei, Fiji, Germany, India, Malaysia, Netherlands, Papua New Guinea, Philippines, Saudi Arabia, Thailand, and Vanuatu. The total number of Participants from all countries is approximately 6,946 service members.

The exercise involves various military activities: Joint Staff Exercise (STAFFEX), Cyber Exercise (CYBEREX), Subject Matter Expert Exchanges (SMEE), Airborne Ops, Cargo Delivery System, Joint Strike, Jungle Field Training Exercise, Special Operation Force, Amphibious Operation, Engineering Civic Action Program (ENCAP), including Combined Arms Life Fire Exercise (CALFEX). The peak exercise, which involved a ground attack, was carried out at the 5th Marine Combat Training Center (Puslatpurmar 5), Baluran, Situbondo, East Java, Indonesia.

In addition, the exercise also included parachuting, airborne ops, and various other training materials, including at the Drop Zone (DZ) at Baturaja Combat Training Center (Puslatpur Baturaja), Ogan Komering Ulu, South Sumatra, Indonesia.

Super Garuda Shield 2024 partnering nations
| Country | Role | Total service members (approx.) | Note and reference |
|---|---|---|---|
| Indonesia | Participant | 4,732 | |
| United States | Participant | 2,500 | |
| Japan | Participant | 280 | |
| Singapore | Participant | 220 | |
| Australia | Participant | 140 | |
| United Kingdom | Participant | 44 | |
| Canada | Participant | 15 | |
| France | Participant | – | |
| New Zealand | Participant | – | |
| South Korea | Participant | – | |
| Brazil | Observer | – | |
| Brunei Darussalam | Observer | – | |
| Fiji | Observer | – | |
| Germany | Observer | – | |
| India | Observer | – | |
| Malaysia | Observer | – | |
| Netherlands | Observer | – | |
| Papua New Guinea | Observer | – | |
| Philippines | Observer | – | |
| Saudi Arabia | Observer | – | |
| Thailand | Observer | – | |
| Vanuatu | Observer | – | |

== Super Garuda Shield 2025 ==
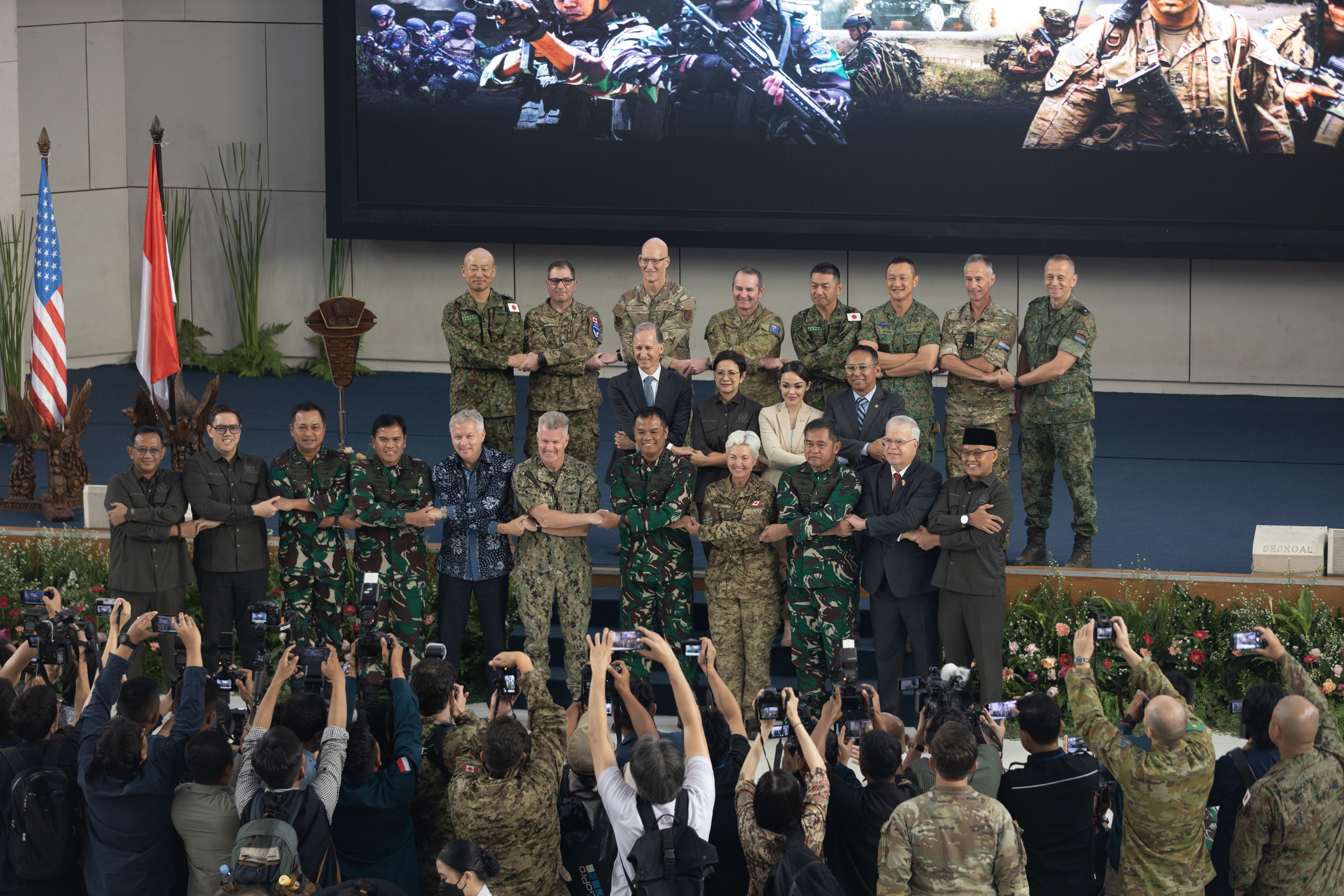
Multinational military service members and leaders shake hands during the Opening Ceremony of Super Garuda Shield 2025, Jakarta, 25 August 2025.

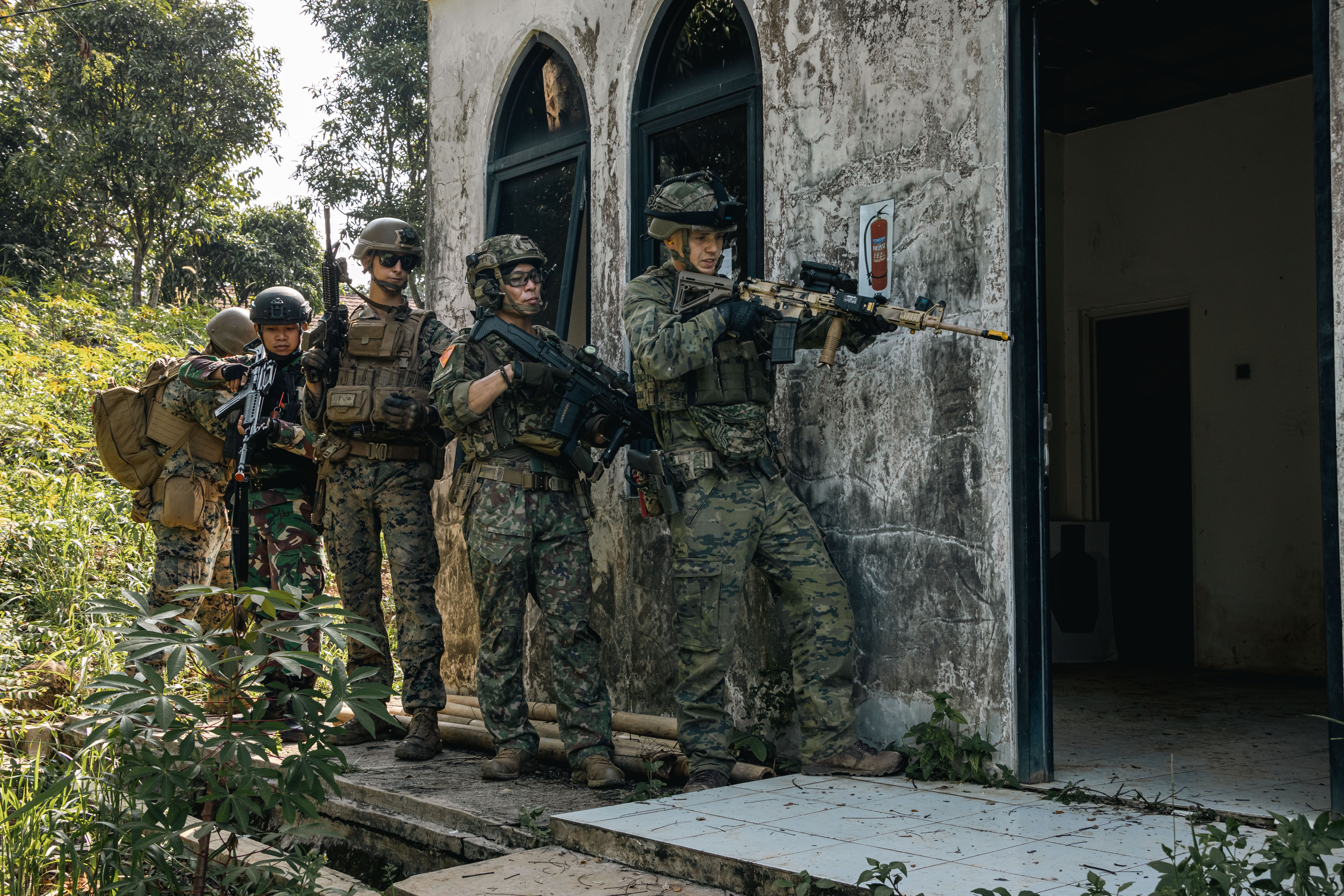
Dutch, Japanese, U.S. and Indonesian forces conduct close quarter battle drills during Super Garuda Shield 2025, Jakarta, 27 August 2025.

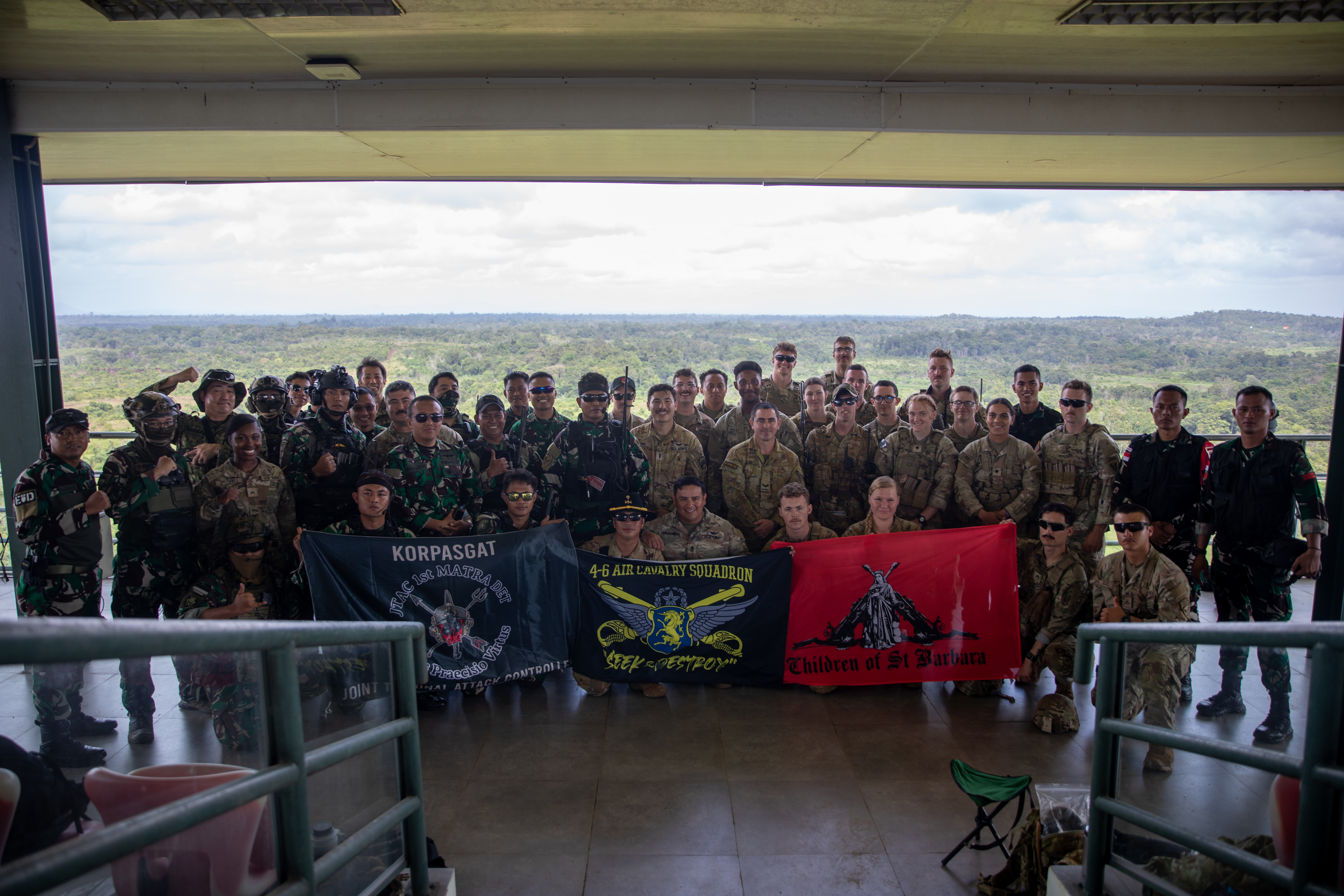
Indonesian, Japanese, Australian and U.S. Army Soldiers pose for a photo after a joint strike live fire exercise during Super Garuda Shield 2025 in Baturaja, Indonesia, 3 September 2025.

The Opening Ceremony of Super Garuda Shield 2025 commenced on 25 August 2025 at Naval Command and Staff College (Seskoal), Cipulir, Jakarta, opened by Deputy Commander of the Indonesian National Armed Forces General Tandyo Budi Revita, attended by the Commander of the United States Indo-Pacific Command Admiral Samuel J Paparo, including other military leaders and senior government from the partnering nations.

Super Garuda Shield 2025, set to take place from 25 August to 3 September 2025, across multiple locations: at the Naval Staff and Command College (Seskoal) in Jakarta, the TNI Peacekeeping Mission Center in West Java, the Indonesian Army Combat Training Center (Puslatpur) in South Sumatra, and the 9th Marine Combat Training Center (Puslatmar IX) in Riau Islands, involving approximately 6,500 military forces from 13 countries, including Indonesia, the United States, Australia, Japan, the UK, with observers from 11 additional nations.

Super Garuda Shield 2025 features maritime and field training events to include engineering civic action program, staff training exercises, cyber exercises, airborne operations, jungle field training exercises, air assault operations, an amphibious exercise, a large field training exercise and combined arms live fire exercises, and a High Mobility Artillery Rocket System (HIMARS) live fire exercise.

Super Garuda Shield 2025 partnering nations
| Country | Role | Total service members (approx.) | Note and reference |
|---|---|---|---|
| Indonesia | Participant | 4,105 | |
| United States | Participant | 1,347 | |
| Japan | Participant | 490 | |
| Australia | Participant | 254 | |
| South Korea | Participant | 100 | |
| Netherlands | Participant | 84 | |
| Singapore | Participant | 62 | |
| Canada | Participant | 35 | |
| France | Participant | 19 | |
| Germany | Participant | 4 | |
| Brazil | Participant | 4 | |
| New Zealand | Participant | 3 | |
| United Kingdom | Participant | 3 | |
| Brunei Darussalam | Observer | – | |
| Cambodia | Observer | – | |
| Fiji | Observer | – | |
| India | Observer | – | |
| Malaysia | Observer | – | |
| Papua New Guinea | Observer | – | |
| Philippines | Observer | – | |
| Saudi Arabia | Observer | – | |
| Thailand | Observer | – | |
| Timor Leste | Observer | – | |
| Vanuatu | Observer | – | |

== Super Garuda Shield 2026 ==
Super Garuda Shield 2026 is the next military exercise, taking place from August 31 to September 11, with the Initial Planning Conference having done on February, being attended by Indonesia, the US, Australia, Japan, the Netherlands, Canada, South Korea, Timor Leste, India, Singapore, New Zealand, Brazil, Italy, Laos, and Cambodia.

== Gallery ==
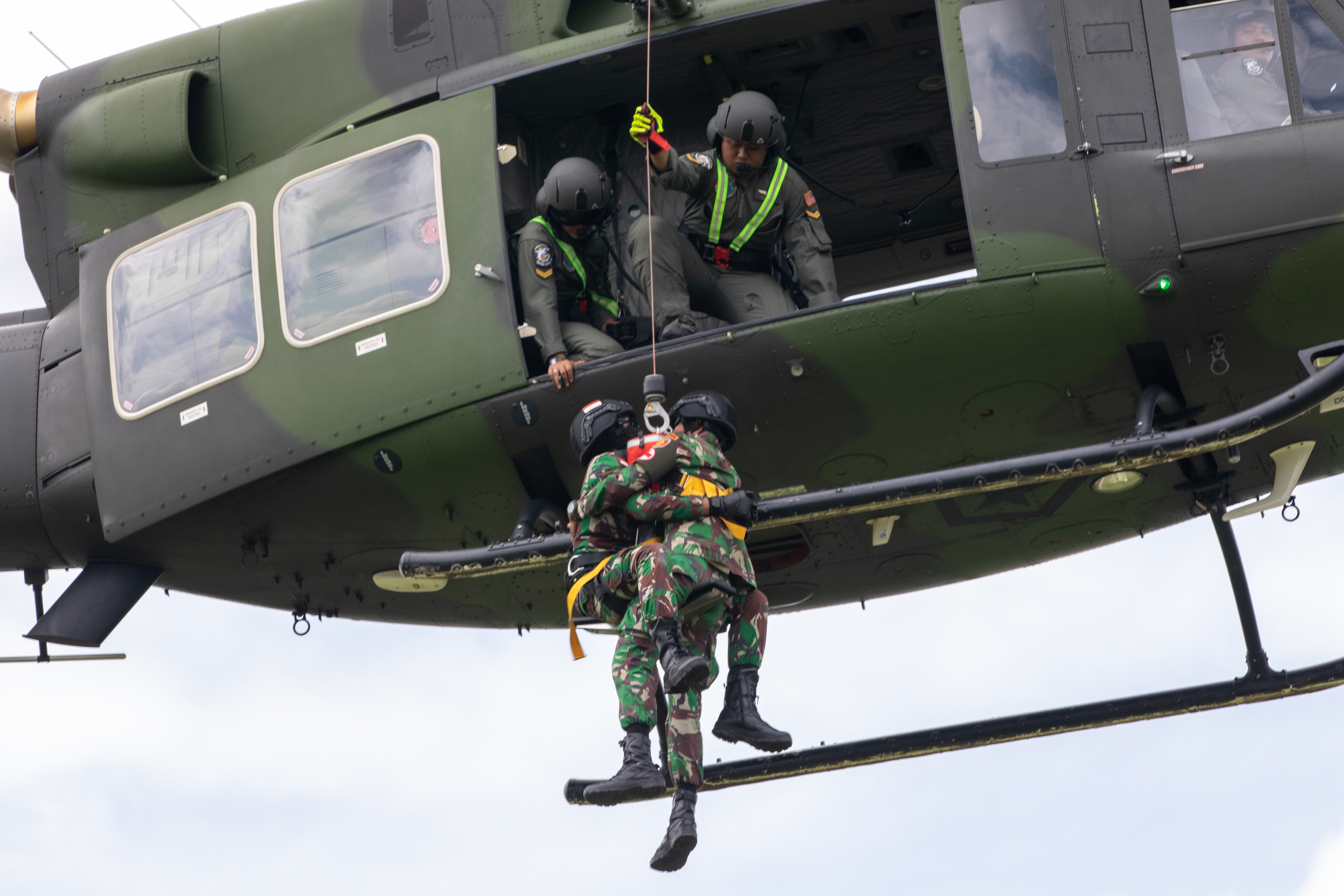
Indonesian Soldiers conduct live hoist training during Exercise Super Garuda Shield 2022.

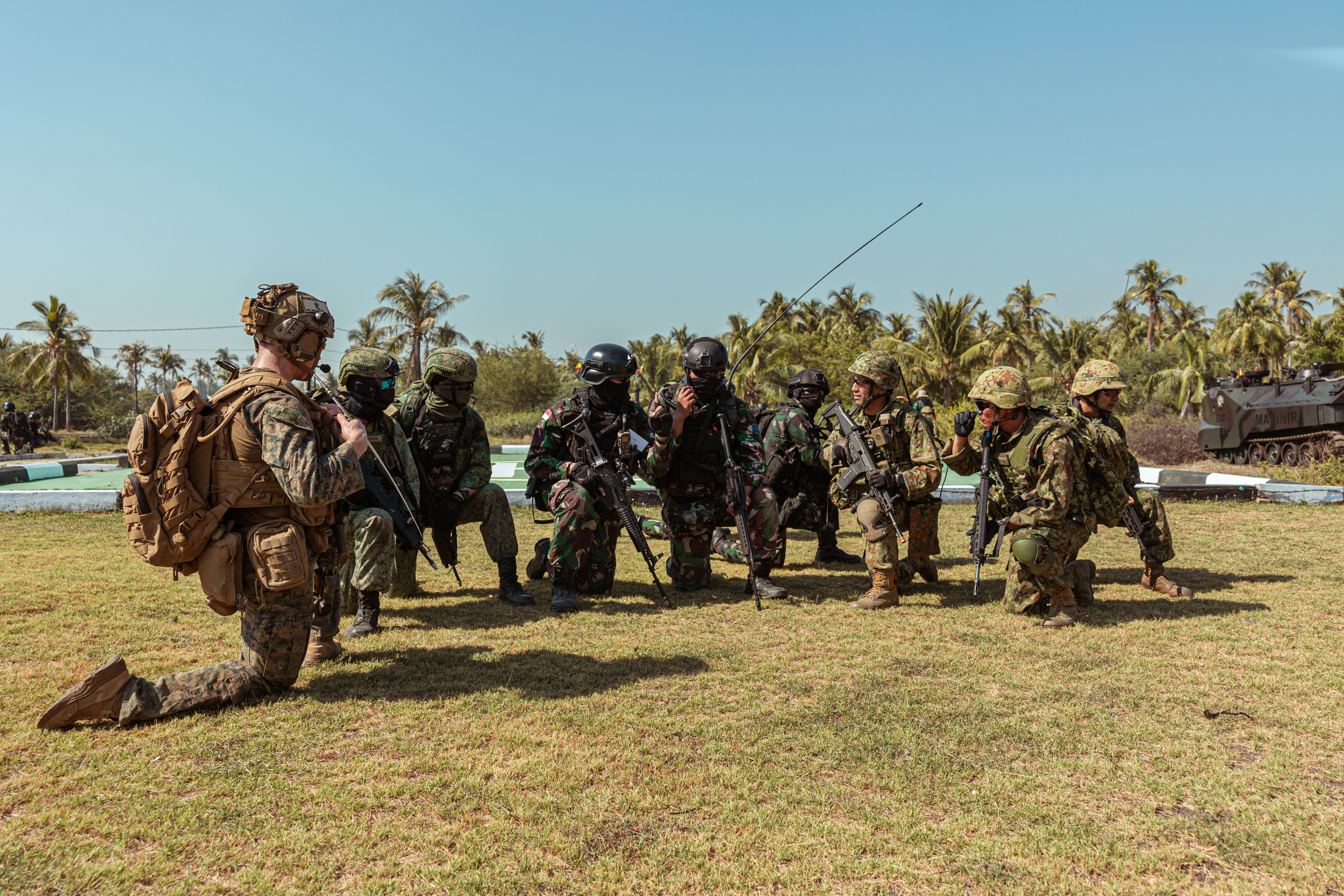
U.S. Marine Corps, Singapore Armed Forces (SAF), Indonesian Marine Corps and Japan Ground Self-Defense Force (JGSDF) soldiers during a multi-lateral amphibious assault for Super Garuda Shield 2023.

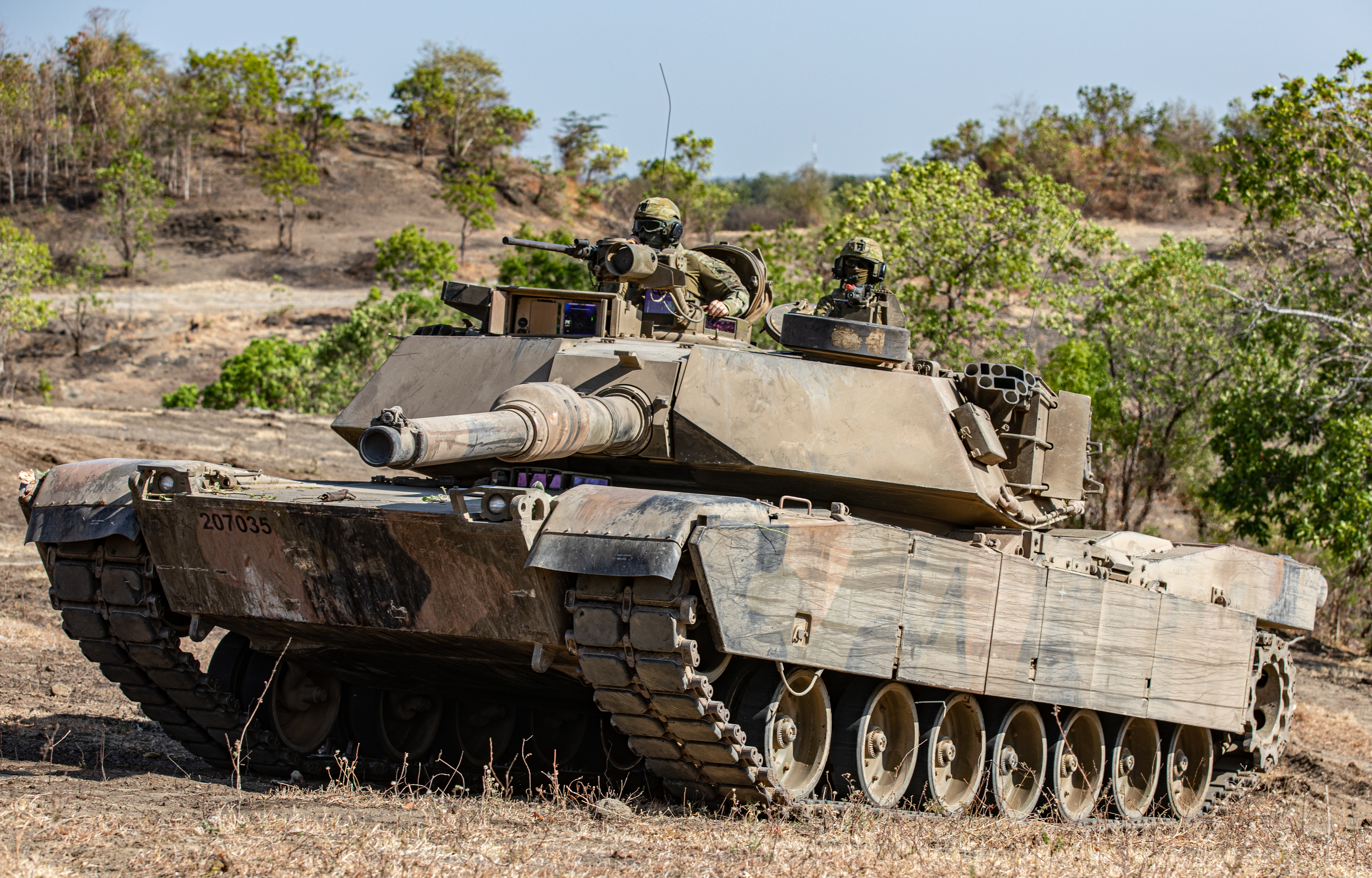
An Australian Defense Force (ADF) M1A1 Abrams tank during Exercise Super Garuda Shield 2023.

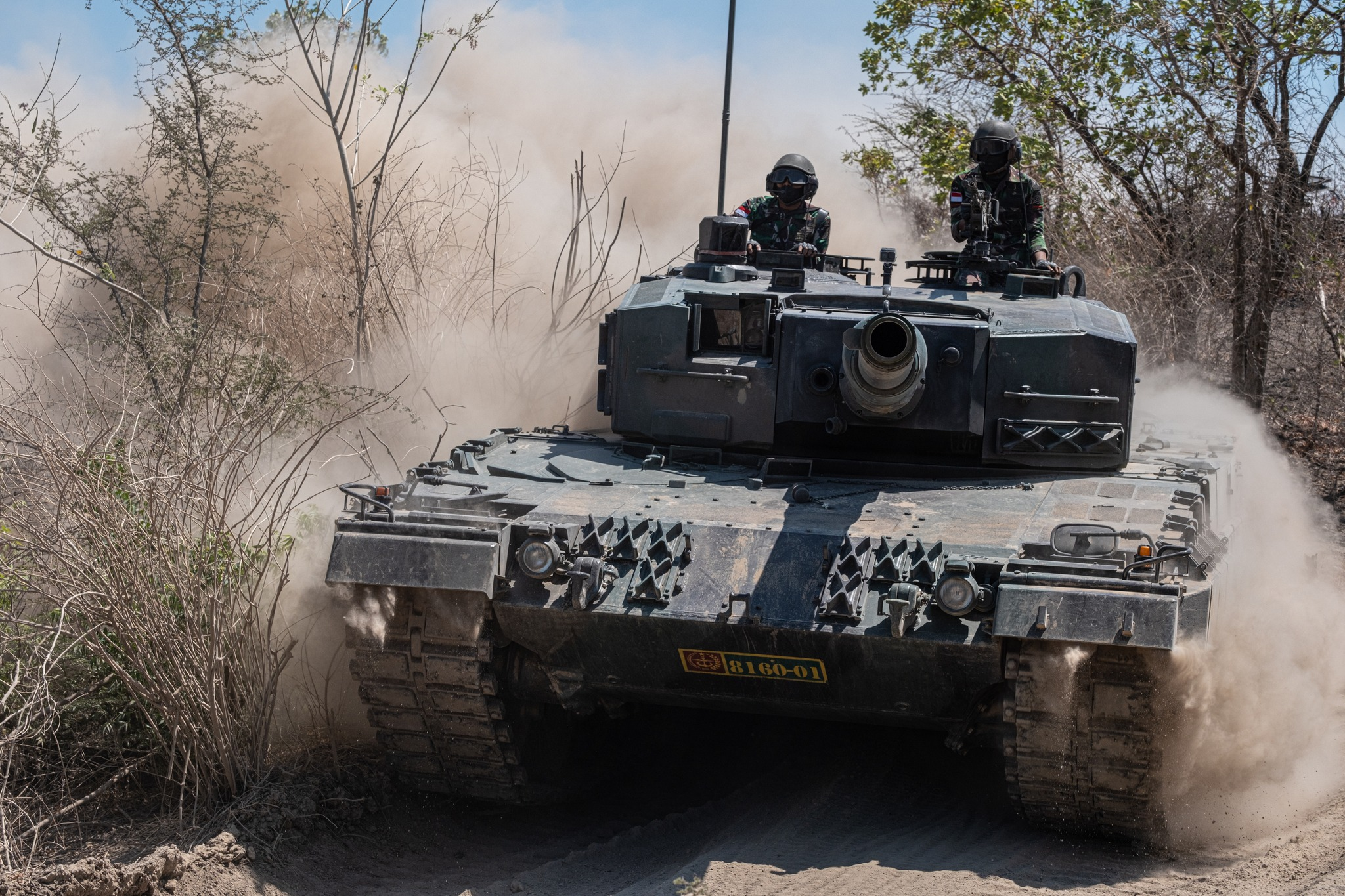
An Indonesian National Armed Forces Leopard 2A4 main battle tank drives towards an assault pause during Exercise Super Garuda Shield 2023.

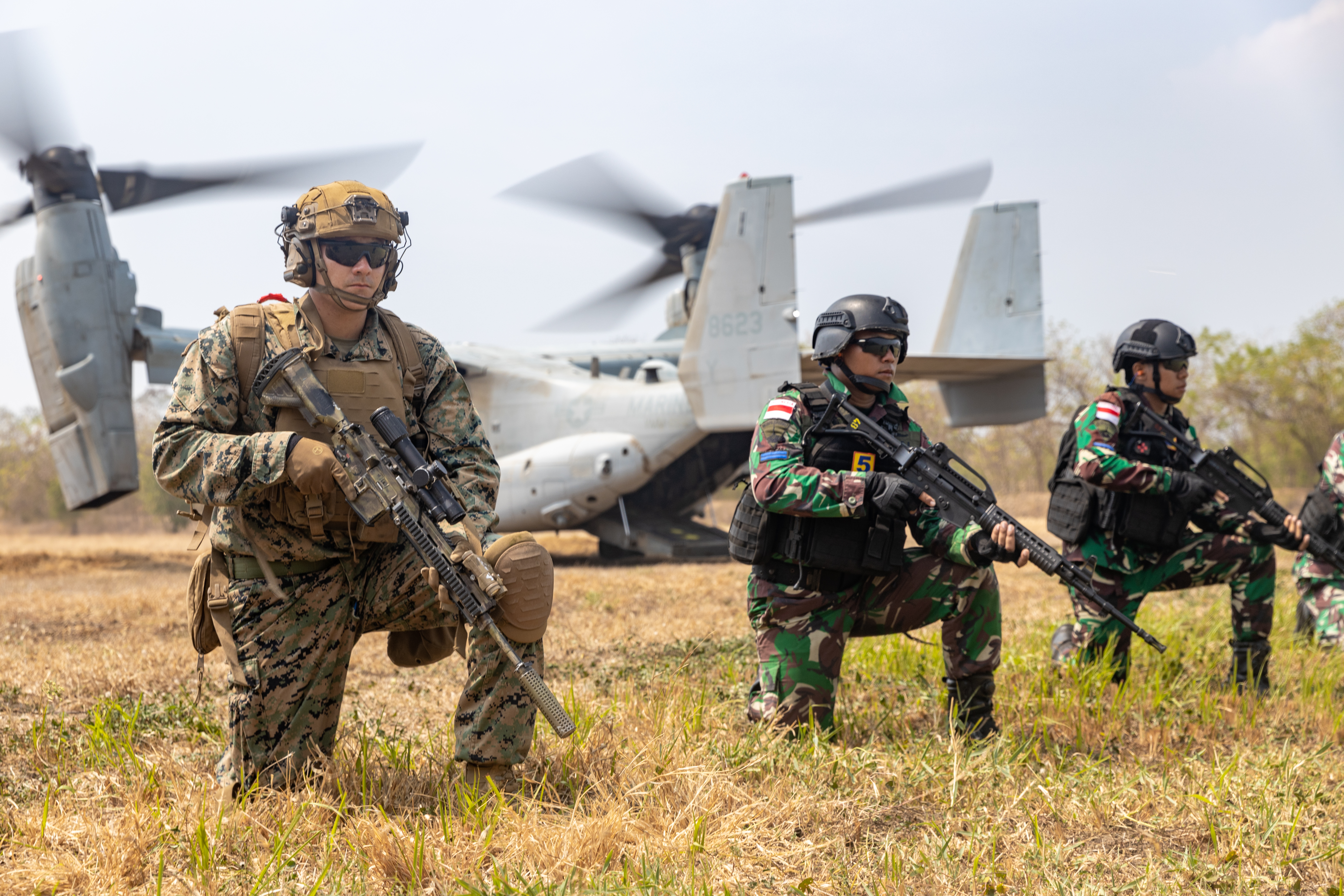
U.S Marines and Indonesian National Armed Forces hold security during on and off drills as part of Super Garuda Shield 2024.

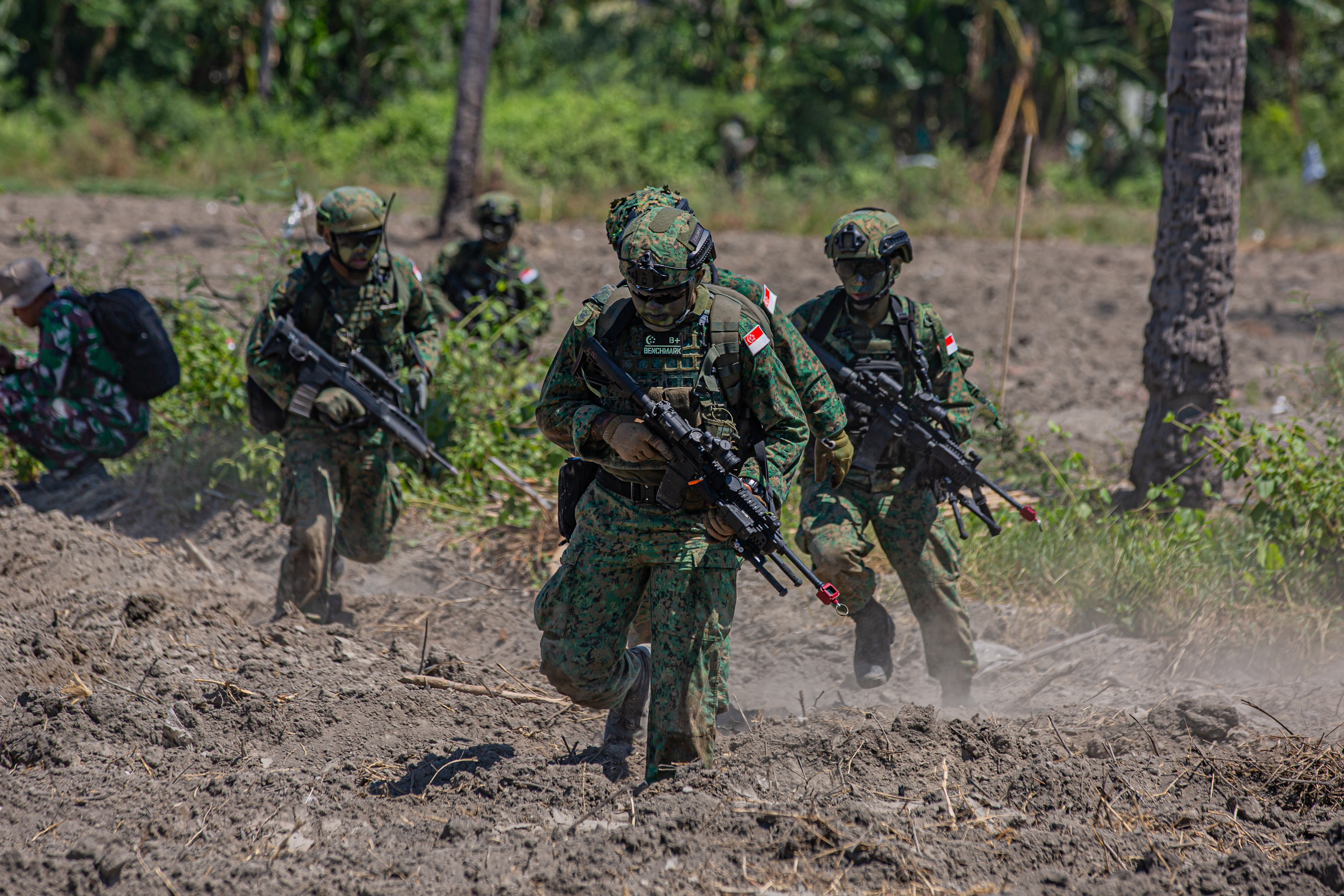
Members of the Singapore Armed Forces push forward in an amphibious assault exercise during Super Garuda Shield 2024.

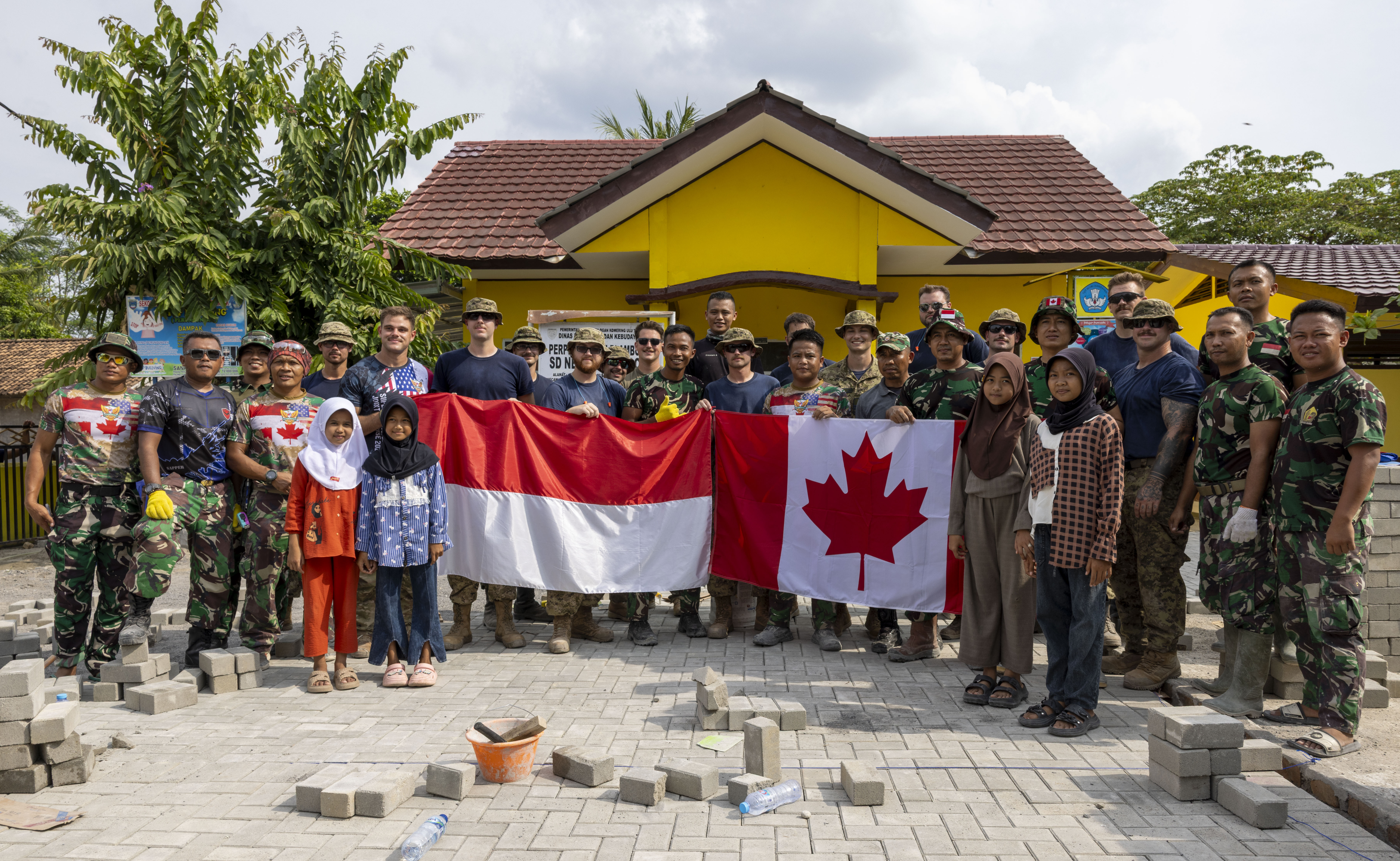
U.S. Army engineers, Canadian Armed Forces engineers, and Indonesian National Armed Forces engineers pose for a group photo with local children during the Engineer Civic Action Program project during exercise Super Garuda Shield 2025.

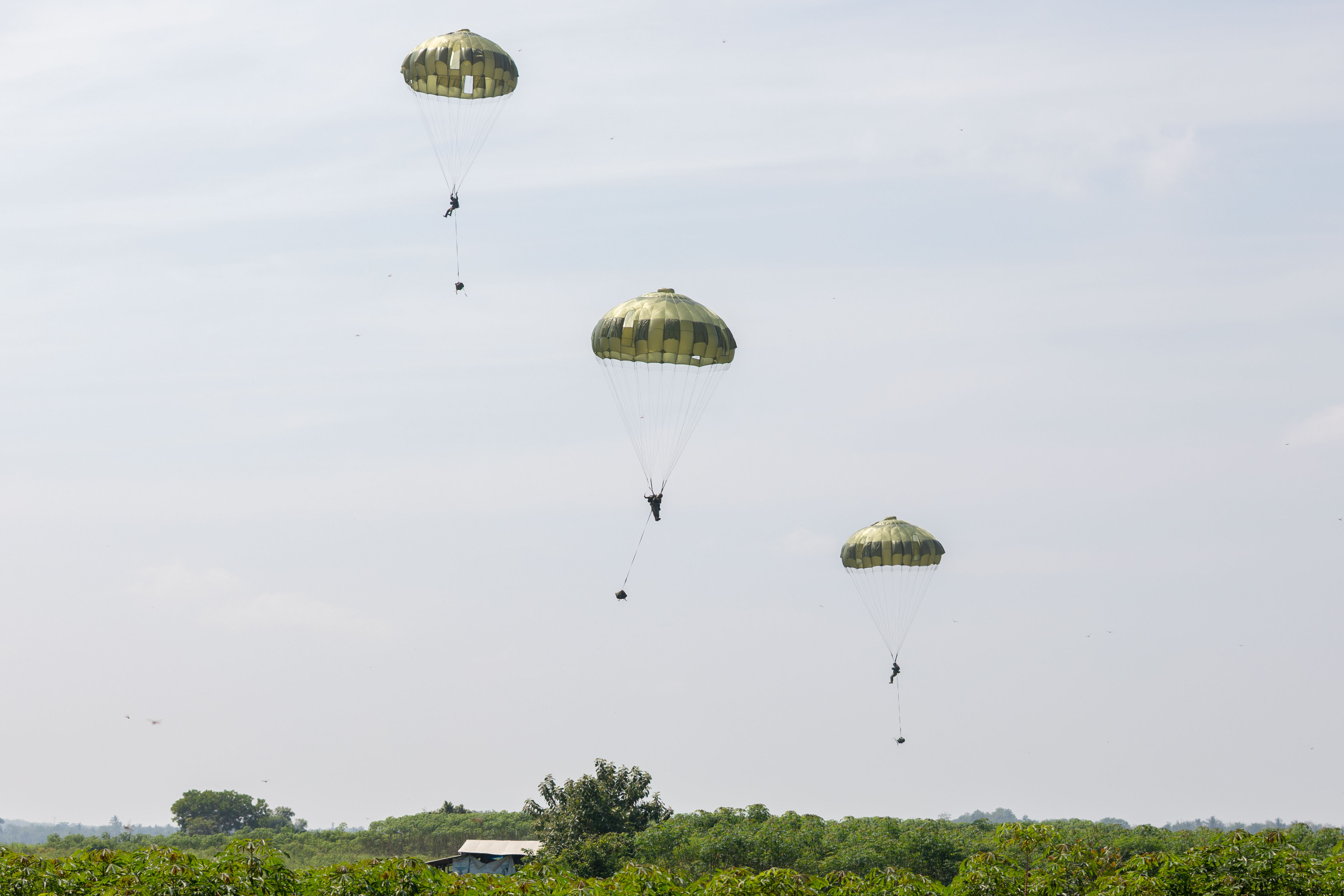
Japan Ground Self-Defense Force paratroopers conduct an airborne jump onto a drop zone in Baturaja, Indonesia, during Super Garuda Shield 2025.

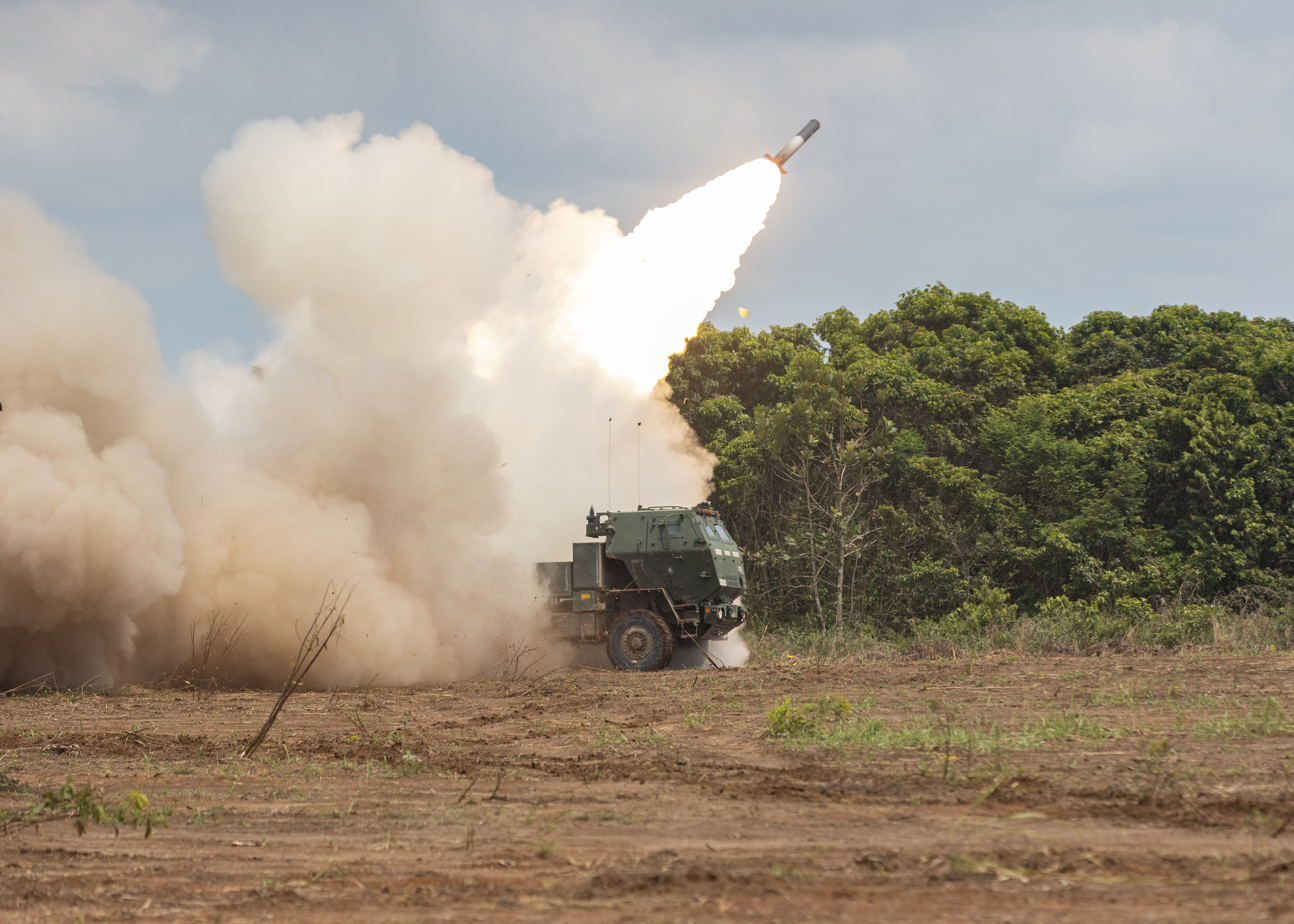
A U.S. Army M142 High Mobility Artillery Rocket System (HIMARS) at a live-fire event during Super Garuda Shield 2025.

== See also ==
- RIMPAC
- Exercise Komodo
- Keris MAREX
- Keris Woomera
