= Arthur J. Logan =

United States Army general

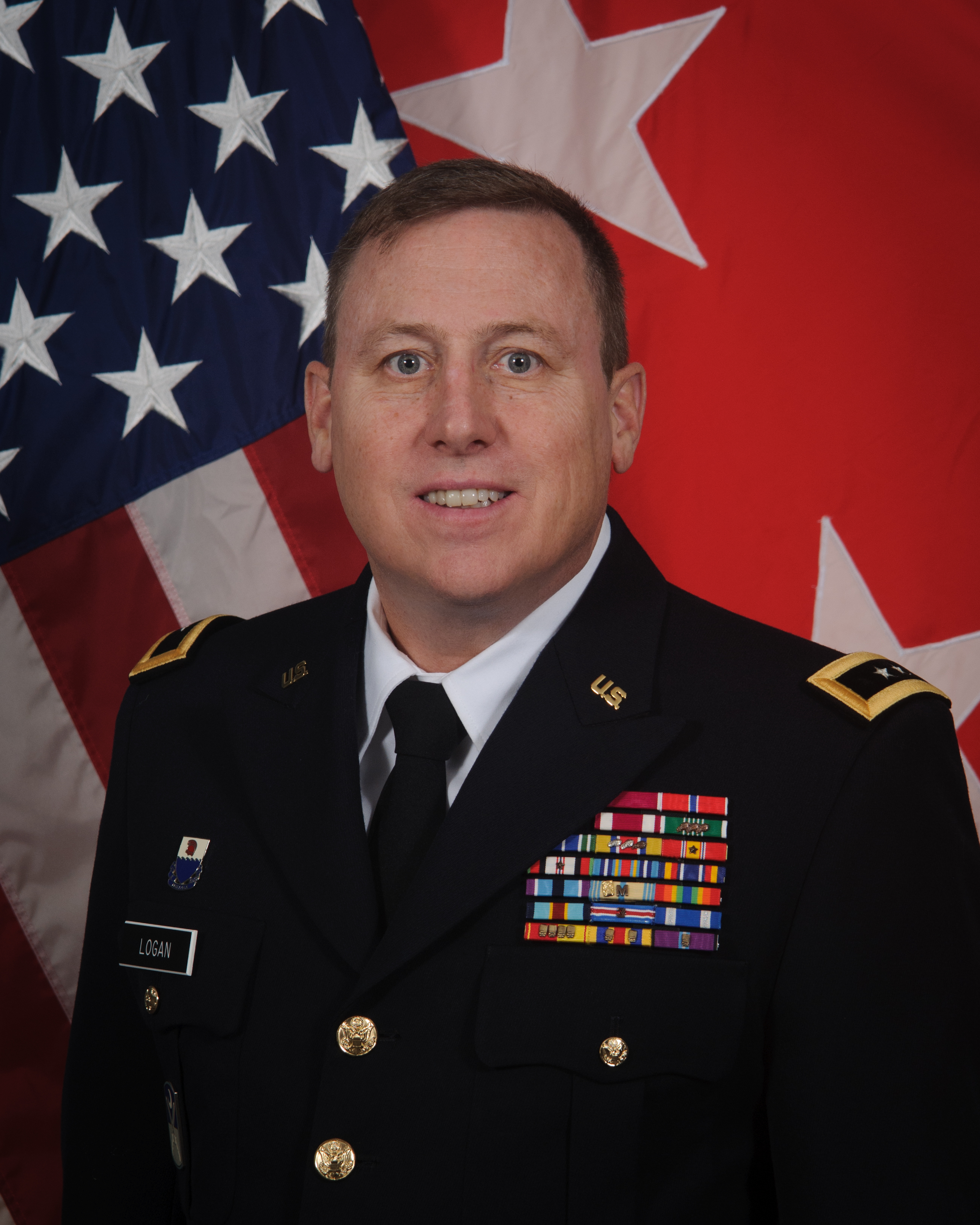
- Nickname: Joe
- Born: Arthur Joseph Logan; Omaha, Nebraska
- Allegiance: United States of America
- Branch: United States Army
- Service years: 1984–2025
- Education: United States Army War College; Hawaii Pacific University; Saint Louis School

Arthur J. Logan is a criminal investigator and the former chief of police on the Honolulu Police Department since June 14, 2022 until July, 2025. Arthur became the adjutant general of Hawaii in January 2015. His promotion to major general was confirmed at the federal level by the U.S. Senate on September 26, 2019.
