= Exercise Komodo =

Biannual international naval exercise hosted by the Indonesian Navy

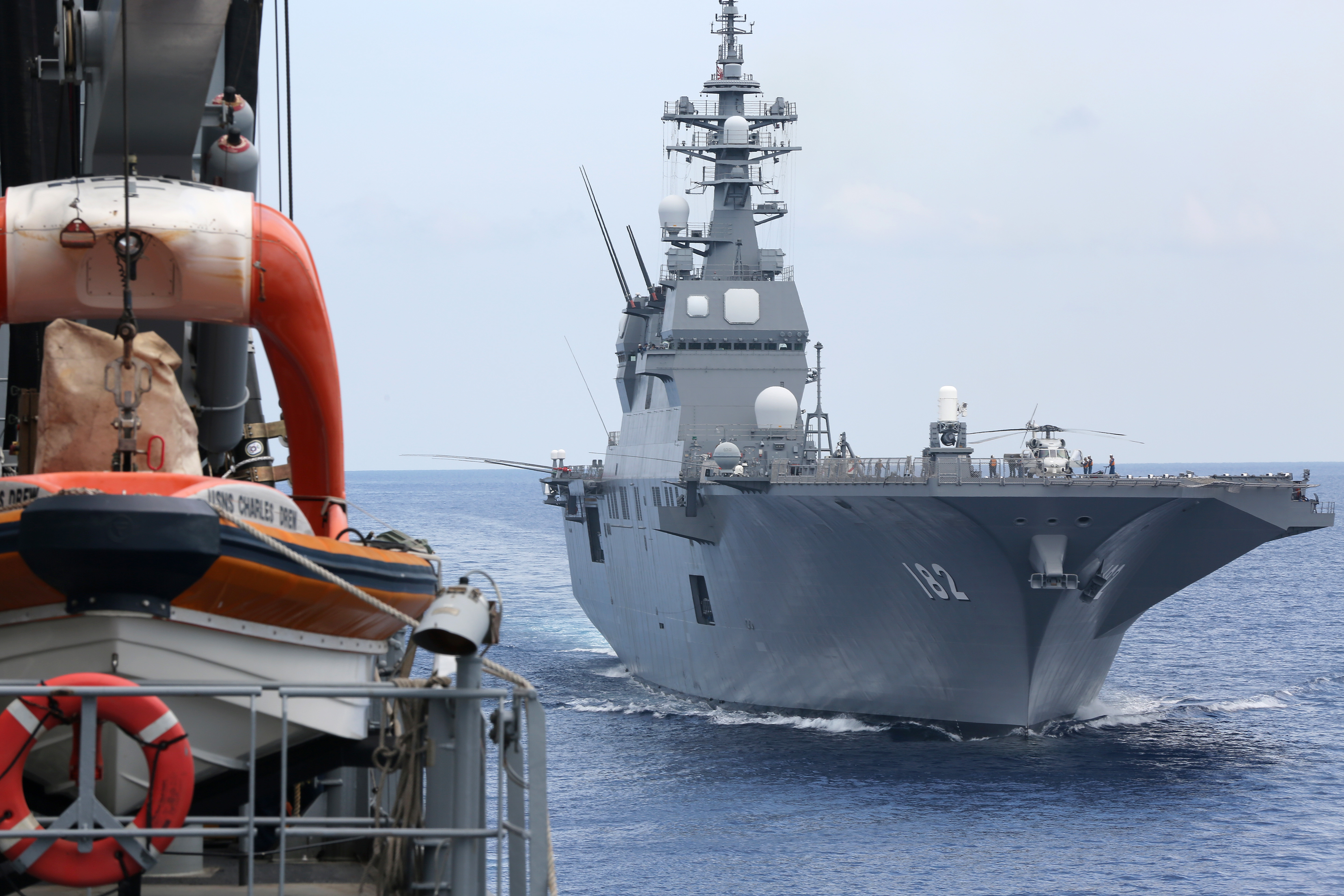
JS Ise during MNEK 2016.

KOMODO or Multilateral Naval Exercise KOMODO (MNEK) is a military exercise hosted and conducted by the Indonesian Navy (TNI-AL). It is biannually held between the Indian Ocean and the Pacific Ocean. The first KOMODO was held in 2014, around Batam.

Its aims are to enhance facilitating multilateral engagement with greater international partners. Four exercises have taken place: 2014, 2016, 2018, 2023 and the latest was held in 2025.

== MNEK 2014(1st) ==
The first MNEK exercise consists of a total of 18 countries and took place around Batam, Natuna and Anambas area. Australia withdrew from the exercise due to political reasons.

MNEK 2014 participating vessels

- JS Akebono (DD-108)
- BRP Ramon Alcaraz (PS-16)
- KDB Darulehsan (07)
- INS Sukanya (P50)
- Khánh Hòa-01 (HQ-561)
- Changbai Shan (989)
- KRI Dr. Soeharso (990)
- KRI Tanjung Nusanive (973)
- KRI Tanjung Kambani (971)
- KRI Soputan (923)
- KRI Arun (903)
- KRI Alamang (644)
- KRI Makassar (590)
- KRI Teluk Cirebon (543)
- KRI Teluk Parigi (539)
- KRI Teluk Hading (538)
- KRI Teluk Banten (516)
- KRI Pati Unus (384)
- KRI Imam Bonjol (383)
- KRI Sultan Iskandar Muda (367)
- KRI Sultan Hasanuddin (366)
- KRI Yos Sudarso (353)
- KAL Bireuen (II-1-63)
- KAL Kumai (I-6-58)
- KAL Antasena (1)

== MNEK 2016 (2nd) ==
The second MNEK lasted from 9 to 16 April 2016. Alongside the exercise, an International Fleet Review was also hosted at Padang, Indonesia. This particular exercise consists of 36 countries.

MNEK 2016 participating vessels

- USS Stockdale (DDG-106)
- JS Ise (DDH-182)
- KDB Daruttaqwa (09)
- RSS Tenacious (71)
- Khánh Hòa-01 (HQ-561)
- INS Sumedha (P58)
- HTMS Narathiwat (OPV-512)
- KRI Halasan (630)
- KRI Makassar (590)
- KRI Teuku Umar (385)
- KRI Pati Unus (384)
- KRI Cut Nyak Dien (375)
- KRI Frans Kaisiepo (368)
- KRI Oswald Siahaan (354)
- KRI Yos Sudarso (353)
- KRI Slamet Riyadi (352)
- KD Mahawangsa (1504)
- KD Kelantan (F175)
- BNS Somudra Avijan (F29)
- SNLS Samadura (P261)
- Vendémiaire (734)
- Admiral Vinogradov (572)
- Weifang (550)
- Changxingdao (861)

== MNEK 2018 (3rd) ==
The third MNEK exercise began on 4 May and lasted until 9 May 2018 around Lombok Island. Indonesia claimed that it was the largest iteration of MNEK, with 43 countries participating: with China and India participating. Alongside the exercise, an International Fleet Review was also hosted.

MNEK 2018 participating vessels

- Liuzhou (573)
- Changsha (173)
- USNS Millinocket (T-EPF-3)
- Perekop (310)
- JS Ōsumi
- Dixmude (L9015)
- Surcouf (F711)
- HMAS Anzac (FFH 150)
- HTMS Krabi (OPV-551)
- Khánh Hòa-01 (HQ-561)
- KD Baung (3509)
- KRI Dr. Soeharso (990)
- KRI Cakalang (852)
- KRI Sidat (851)
- KRI Tongkol (813)
- KRI Kakap (811)
- KRI Pandrong (801)
- KRI Kujang (642)
- KRI Clurit (641)
- KRI Barakuda (633)
- KRI Banjarmasin (592)
- KRI Makassar (590)
- KRI Ki Hajar Dewantara (364)
- KRI Fatahillah (361)
- KRI Yos Sudarso (353)
- KRI Ahmad Yani (351)
- KRI I Gusti Ngurah Rai (332)
- BRP General Mariano Alvarez (PS-38)
- BRP Gregorio del Pilar (PS-15)
- RSS Formidable (68)
- SLNS Sagara (P-622)

== MNEK 2023 (4th) ==
The fourth MNEK exercise consisted of roughly 36 navies, and took place in Makassar with theme of 'Partnership to recover and to rise stronger'.

MNEK 2023 participating Countries

- Australia
- Brazil
- Brunei
- Bangladesh
- Cambodia
- Canada
- China
- Chile
- Fiji
- India
- Japan
- Kenya
- South Korea
- Malaysia
- Myanmar
- New Zealand
- Netherlands
- United Kingdom
- United States
- Other (17)

== MNEK 2025 (5th) ==
38 nations join Indonesia for Komodo 2025 naval exercise in Bali Indonesian Navy Chief of Staff Admiral Muhammad Ali during a press statement in the 5th Multilateral Naval Exercise Komodo 2025 (MNEK) in Tanjung Benoa Waters, Bali, on Sunday (February 16, 2025)

Indonesian Navy Chief of Staff Admiral Muhammad Ali announced that 38 countries and 19 foreign warships participated in the 5th Multilateral Naval Exercise Komodo 2025 (MNEK) in Tanjung Benoa Waters, Bali, on Sunday.

During the opening ceremony, Ali expressed his hope that the exercise would prioritize natural disaster mitigation and humanitarian assistance/disaster relief, as well as addressing joint maritime threats in non-warfighting scenarios.

"Nineteen foreign warships are present, along with 17 Indonesian warships, ranging from the Indonesian Coast Guard and Marine Police Corps to fishing vessels, all joining this exercise," he stated.

Seven helicopters and three Maritime Patrol Aircraft (MPA) also participated in the joint exercise, themed "Maritime Partnership For Peace and Stability."

In addition to the at-sea training, Ali said the Indonesian Navy would conduct various activities, including the Engineering Civic Action Program (ENCAP), a humanitarian program involving the construction of public facilities such as roads and places of worship in Antiga Kelod village, Karangasem District, Bali.

This will be followed by other humanitarian activities, such as the Medical Civic Action Program (MEDCAP), a community health service program that includes comprehensive health checks, dental health checks, mass circumcisions, blood donations, and minor medical surgeries on the KRI dr. Wahidin Sudiro Husodo-991 (KRI WSH-991), docked at Tanah Ampo Pier, Karangasem District, on February 17.

Dozens of participating countries will also attend the 6th International Maritime Security Symposium (IMSS) on February 17, the largest symposium event held by the Indonesian Navy.

This symposium provides a forum for participants and delegates to discuss the latest regional and global maritime issues from various aspects and perspectives.

The 5th Multilateral Naval Exercise Komodo (MNEK) also includes an environmental conservation and coastal abrasion prevention program, featuring mangrove tree planting in the I Gusti Ngurah Rai Forest Park Area, the release of turtle hatchlings at Peninsula Beach, Nusa Dua, Bali, and a beach cleanup at Mertasari Sanur Beach.

Participating Countries and their assets :

- Indonesia with KRI Dewaruci, KRI Diponegoro, KRI I Gusti Ngurah Rai, KRI Raden Eddy Martadinata, KRI Bung Tomo, KRI Sultan Iskandar Muda, KRI Tombak, KRI Panah, KRI Kapak, KRI dr. Radjiman Wedyodiningrat, KRI Bung Karno, KRI Bawal, KRI Marlin, KRI dr. Soeharso, KRI Dr. Wahidin Sudiro Husodo
- India, with INS Shardul & P-8I Neptune Maritime Patrol Aircraft.
- Russia with Multi-role Corvette Steregushchiy-class corvette RFS Aldar Tsydenzhapov and RFS Rezkiy and oiler Pachenga
- United States of America with USS Dewey
- France with Vendemiaire
- Australia with HMAS Hobart
- United Kingdom with HMS Spey
- Pakistan with PNS Aslat (F254)
- Japan with JS Asahi
- Singapore With RSS Valour and RSS Fortitude
- Philippines with BRP Ramon Alcaraz
- Vietnam with VPNS HQ-09
- Italy with Antonio Marceglia
- Thailand with HTMS Pattani
- Malaysia with KD Kelantan and KD Selangor
- South Korea with ROKS No Jeok Bong

== See also ==
- RIMPAC
- Super Garuda Shield
- AMAN
- CARAT
- Keris MAREX
