= KRI Pati Unus =

KRI Pati Unus is the name of the following ships of the Indonesian Navy:

- KRI Pati Unus (1949), a Bathurst-class corvette launched in 1949, in service for Indonesia 1949–1969
- KRI Pati Unus (384), a Kapitan Pattimura-class corvette launched in 1981, in service for Indonesia 1995–2017

== See also ==
- Pati Unus
