= Soviet ship Bezzavetny =

Bezzavetny is the name of the following ships of the Soviet Navy:

- Soviet destroyer Bezzavetny, a Skory-class destroyer launched in 1951, sold to Indonesia in 1959, decommissioned in 1973
- Soviet frigate Bezzavetny, a Krivak-class frigate launched in 1977, transferred to Ukraine in 1997 as Dnipropetrovsk, decommissioned in 2002 and scuttled in 2005
