= KRI Sultan Iskandar Muda =

Two ships of the Indonesian Navy have been called KRI Sultan Iskandar Muda, named after the Iskandar Muda of Acèh Darussalam, the twelfth Sultan of Aceh Sultanate, and a National Hero of Indonesia.

- KRI Sultan Iskandar Muda (304) was a Skoryy-class destroyer, formerly the Soviet destroyer Bezzavetny. She was acquired in 1962 and stricken in 1971.
- KRI Sultan Iskandar Muda (367) is a Diponegoro-class corvette launched in 2007 and commissioned in 2008.
