= Sanuki Shipbuilding & Iron Works Company =

Japanese company

Coordinates: 34.222468°N 133.672693°E

Sanuki Shipbuilding & Iron Works Co.
- Company type: Kabushiki gaisha
- Industry: Shipbuilding
- Founded: 1942; 84 years ago
- Defunct: 2009
- Fate: Bankruptcy
- Headquarters: Mitoyo, Kagawa, Japan
- Area served: International
- Key people: Sotaro Yamazaki
- Products: Ferries; Passenger ships
- Operating income: ¥ 195.87 million
- Net income: ¥ 6,459.36 million

Sanuki Shipbuilding Iron Works Company (株式会社讃岐造船鉄工所) is a Japanese shipbuilding company that once existed in Mitoyo City, Kagawa Prefecture.

== Background ==
After being founded in April 1887, Sanuki Shipbuilding Iron Works Co., Ltd. was established in February 1942 in response to a joint corporate order from the Pacific War. After becoming a joint-stock company in 1944, it built pelagic fishing boats, etc., but since 1957 it has advanced to the construction of steel boats, mainly building coastal vessels such as passenger ships, ferries, small tankers, and work boats, and in 1982. It has grown into a mid-sized company in the shipbuilding industry, with annual sales of 5,915 million yen in the fiscal year ended November. Especially in Bisan Seto, where many ferries come and go, we have supplied many ferries in the form of sharing the market with Fujiwara Shipbuilding Co., Ltd. on Omishima Island.

However, in the fiscal year ended November 1999, the opening of the Seto Ohashi Bridge forced the shipping companies of Bisan Seto, which was a major customer, to shrink across the board, and the unit price fell due to the shipbuilding recession and competition with the overseas shipbuilding industry. The annual sales were halved to 2,442 million yen, and the business situation deteriorated due to the burden of capital investment. In September 2000, he filed a petition to the Kanonji branch of the Takamatsu District Court with a total debt of approximately 3.6 billion yen to start civil rehabilitation proceedings. After that, the rehabilitation plan was approved in July 2001, and the approval was confirmed in August of the same year. In September 2004, Hideo Sabun, the representative of Sabun Kogyo, embarked on support and implemented a capital increase through third-party allotment to become the largest shareholder, and the rehabilitation procedure was completed in November of the same year.

After that, orders for new ships were strong, and in the fiscal year ended November 2008, the company posted annual sales of 6,459.36 million yen, which exceeded the peak before civil rehabilitation. Support was discontinued by the Hyakujushi Bank. On 29 July 2009, the Takamatsu District Court Kanonji Branch filed for the start of civil rehabilitation proceedings again, but was not accepted and filed for bankruptcy proceedings on July 31. It was decided to start bankruptcy proceedings on August 12, and it went bankrupt. The total debt was about 9.4 billion yen. Due to this bankruptcy, the companies of Sabun Kogyo, Mandatsu Kogyo, and Shin Kogyo, for which Sabun was the president, have also gone bankrupt.

The site was purchased by Mitoyo City, and after constructing a facility with a PFI method centered on the aquarium as a busy creation project in the area around Takuma Port, the property was transferred to Mitoyo City. Although the completion target for August 2019 was planned as a BTO method for the operation and management, the plan was abandoned because there was no application from a private business operator.

== Ships built ==
Ships built by Sanuki Shipyard include:

- Utaka Kokudo Ferry - Daisen Maru, Kokudo Maru, Utaka Maru
- Shikoku Ferry - Kobe Maru, Kobe Maru, 21st ball Takamaru, 22nd ball Takamaru, 23rd ball Takamaru, 31st ball Takamaru, 32nd ball Takamaru, 51st ball Takamaru, 81st ball Takamaru, 85th ball Takamaru, 87th ball Takamaru, Super Marine 1, 1st Shodoshima Maru, 2nd Shodoshima Maru, 7th Shodoshima Maru
- Urban Cruiser - Silpheed (currently Kobe Cruiser Concerto)
- Bosei Kisen - Queen Boze
- Awashima Kisen (Kagawa Prefecture) - Ashima
- Hayate - Superliner Hayate Montblanc
- Tokushima Prefecture - Fishing research vessel Tokushima
- Kagoshima City Ship Bureau - 13th Sakurajima Maru, 16th Sakurajima Maru
