= Green Dagger =

Five-day military exercise

Exercise Green Dagger is a five-day military exercise held annually at the Marine Corps Air Ground Combat Center in Twentynine Palms California, located in the Mojave Desert. It is attended by military forces from a number of countries including the United States Marines, United Kingdom Royal Marines, Netherlands, United Arab Emirates and Canada.
