= Dynamic Manta =

Annual NATO military exercise

Dynamic Manta, formerly Proud Manta and Noble Manta, is an annual military exercise held by NATO that "aimed at testing submarine warfare and anti-submarine warfare capabilities. It provides a framework for naval forces to maintain high readiness and ability to operate together." It takes place primarily in the Mediterranean Sea and has been held since approximately 2006.

It is one of three exercises run by Allied Maritime Command in addition to Dynamic Merlin, which takes place in the Baltic sea, and Dynamic Mongoose, which takes place in the North Sea.

== Dynamic Manta 2021 ==
Dynamic Manta 2021 Participating Forces
| French Navy | Charles de Gaulle; Languedoc; Provence; Chevalier Paul; Tanker Var |
| Hellenic Navy | Kountouriotis; Kanaris |
| Italian Navy | Virginio Fasan; Carlo Margottini |
| Spanish Navy | Cristóbal Colón |
| Belgian Navy | Leopold I |
| Turkish Navy | Turkish Kemalreis |
| United States Navy | USS Porter; USS Los Angeles |
