= Keris Woomera =

Indonesian National Armed Forces-Australian Defence Force joint military exercise

Exercise Keris Woomera
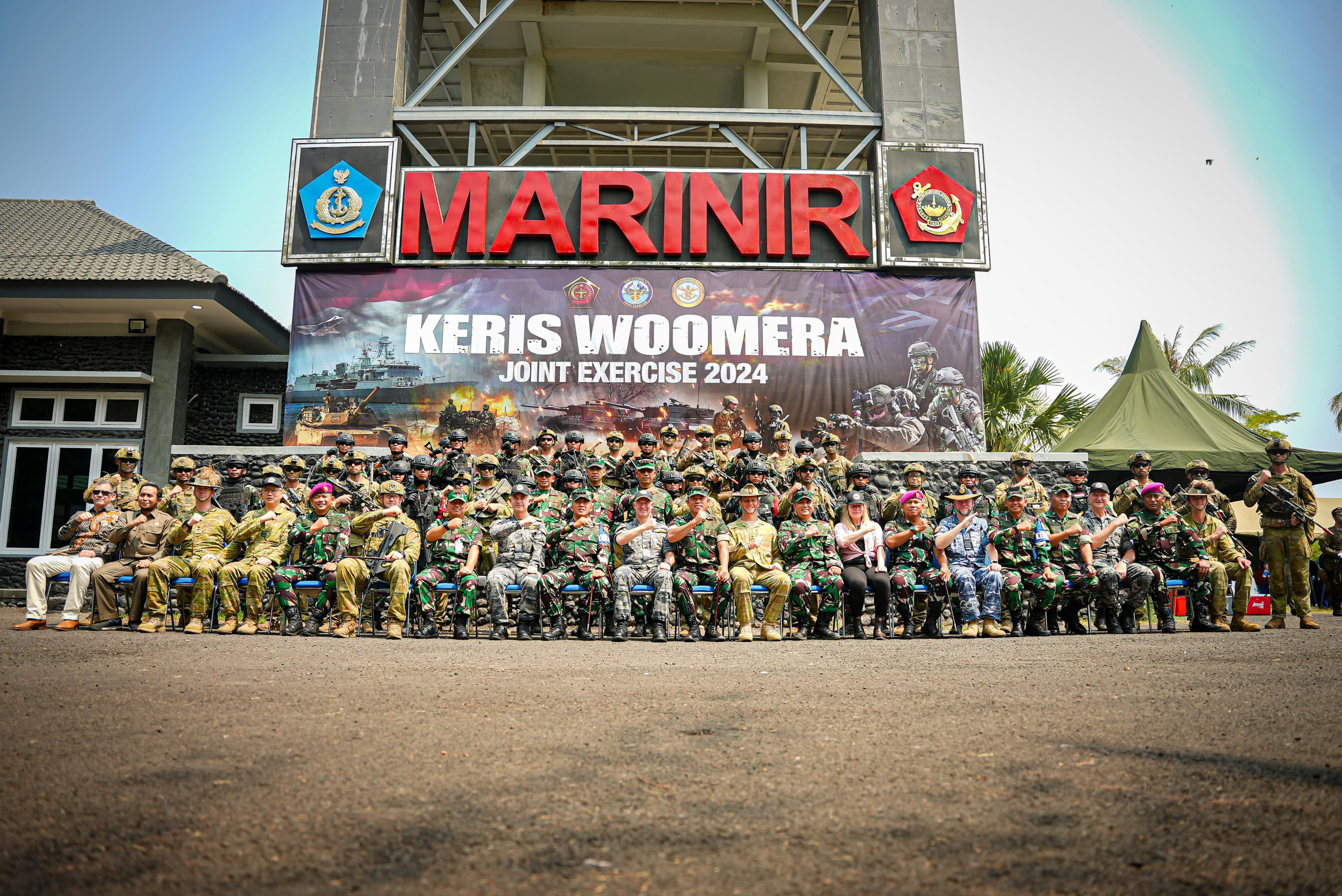
- Service members from ADF and TNI, including senior government pose for a foto group during exercise Keris Woomera 2024, Situbondo, East Java, Indonesia.
- Status: Active
- Genre: Bilateral military exercise
- Frequency: Biennial
- Locations: Australia and Indonesia
- Years active: 2024–present
- Participants: Australia; Indonesia
- Organizer: Australian Defence Force; Indonesian National Armed Forces

Exercise Keris Woomera is a bilateral military exercise between the Indonesian National Armed Forces (Indonesian: Tentara Nasional Indonesia or TNI) and the Australian Defence Force (ADF) aims to enhance interoperability and strengthen the defense relationship between the two nations. Keris Woomera is conducted since 2024 in Australia and Indonesia.

== Overview ==
Exercise Keris Woomera is a significant combined joint military exercise between the Australian Defence Force (ADF) and the Indonesian National Armed Forces (TNI), named after the traditional Indonesian dagger (Keris) and the Australian spear-thrower (Woomera). The exercise is a key component of the broader Indo-Pacific Endeavour and aims to enhance interoperability and strengthen the defense relationship between the two nations.

Exercise Keris Woomera first held in 2024, demonstrated the ongoing close military cooperation between Australia and Indonesia, strengthened by the signing of the Australia-Indonesia Defence Cooperation Agreement—the most significant defence agreement in the history of the bilateral relationship.

== Keris Woomera 2024 ==
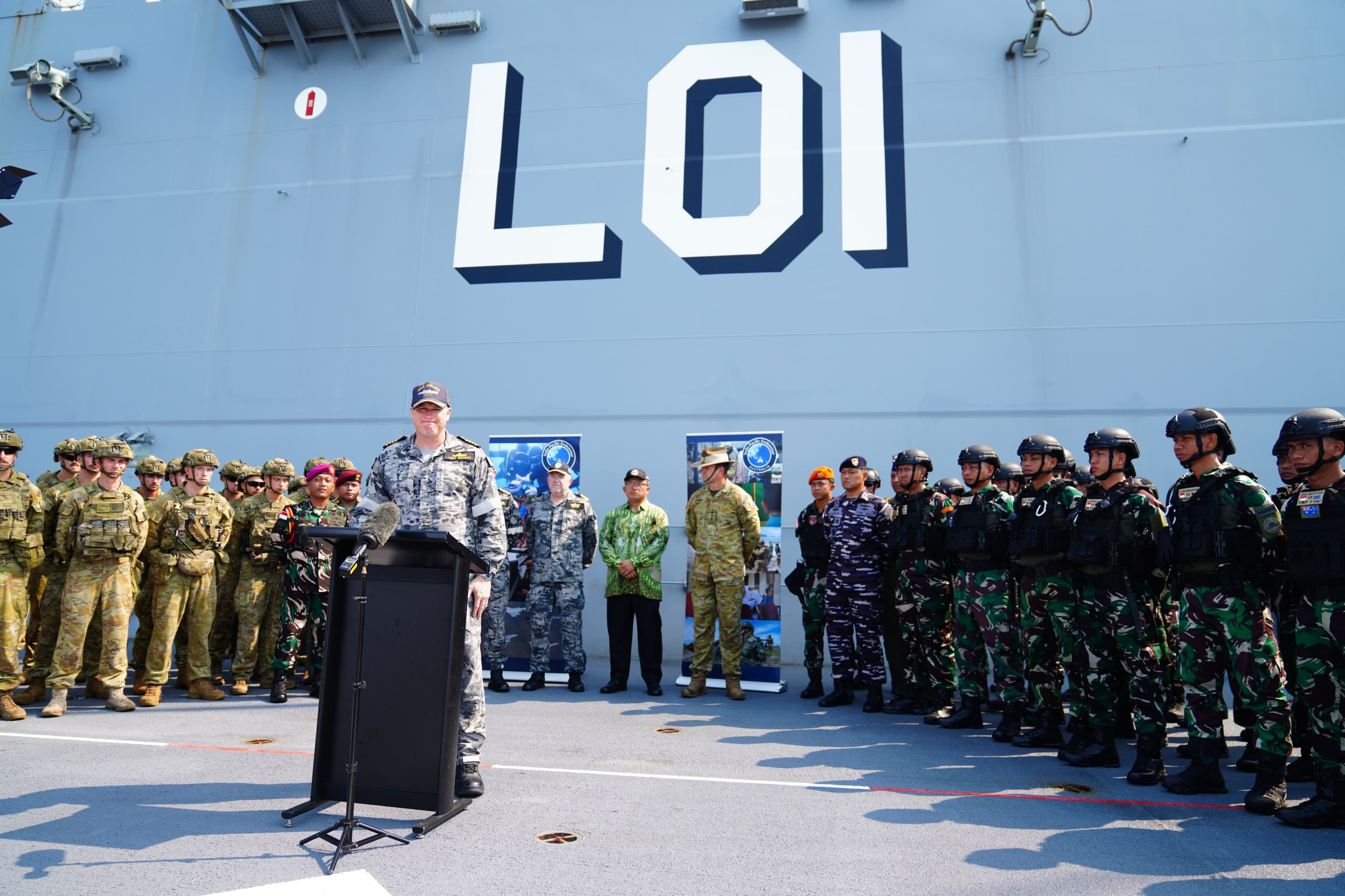
Service members from Australian Defense Force (ADF) and Indonesian National Armed Forces (TNI) pose for a group photo following the opening ceremony of Keris Woomera 2024 on the deck of HMAS Adelaide, Darwin, Australia, 3 November 2024.

The Indonesian National Armed Forces (TNI) together with the Australian Armed Forces (ADF) held the Joint Exercise Keris Woomera 2024, which was officially opened through an opening ceremony led by the Commander of Indo-Pacific Endeavor Commodore Michael Harris, OAM. on the deck of HMAS Adelaide, Darwin, Australia, Sunday, 3 November 2024.

Exercise Keris Woomera 2024 (KW24) was held from 1 to 17 November 2024 at two main locations: Bathurst Island, Australia and Banongan, Situbondo, East Java, Indonesia.

Approximately 2,000 personnel from both countries participated in the exercise led by the Commander of the Australian Task Force Captain Chris Doherty, and Commander of the Indonesian Task Force Lt. Col. (Mar) Empri Airudin. The exercise also attended by the Chief of Joint Operations of the Australian Navy Vice Admiral Justin Jones, and Chief of Indonesian Navy’s Education and Training, Lt. General (Mar) Nur Alamsyah.

The exercise consists air, maritime, amphibious and land operations, as well as a humanitarian assistance and disaster relief evacuation scenario.

== Gallery ==
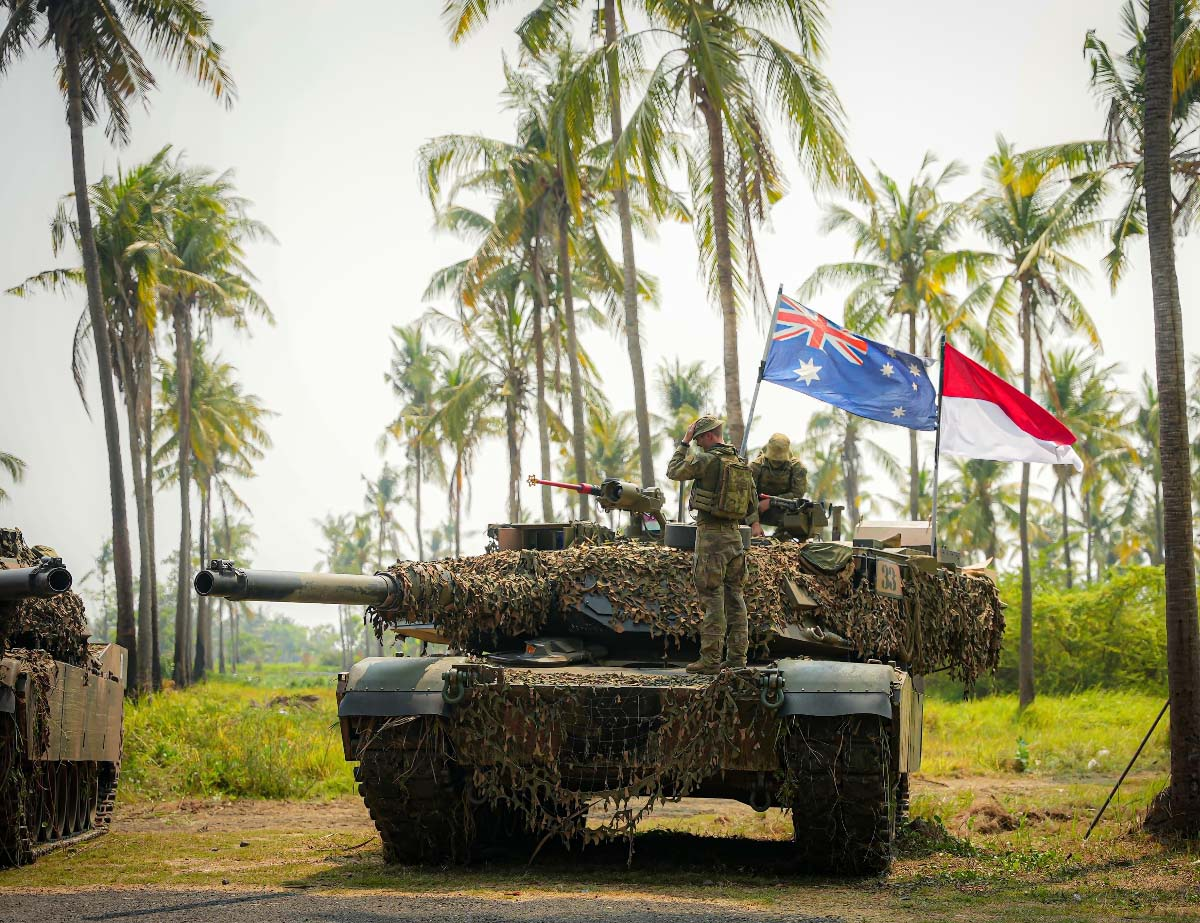
Australian Defense Force (ADF) M1A1 Abrams during exercise Keris Woomera 2024.

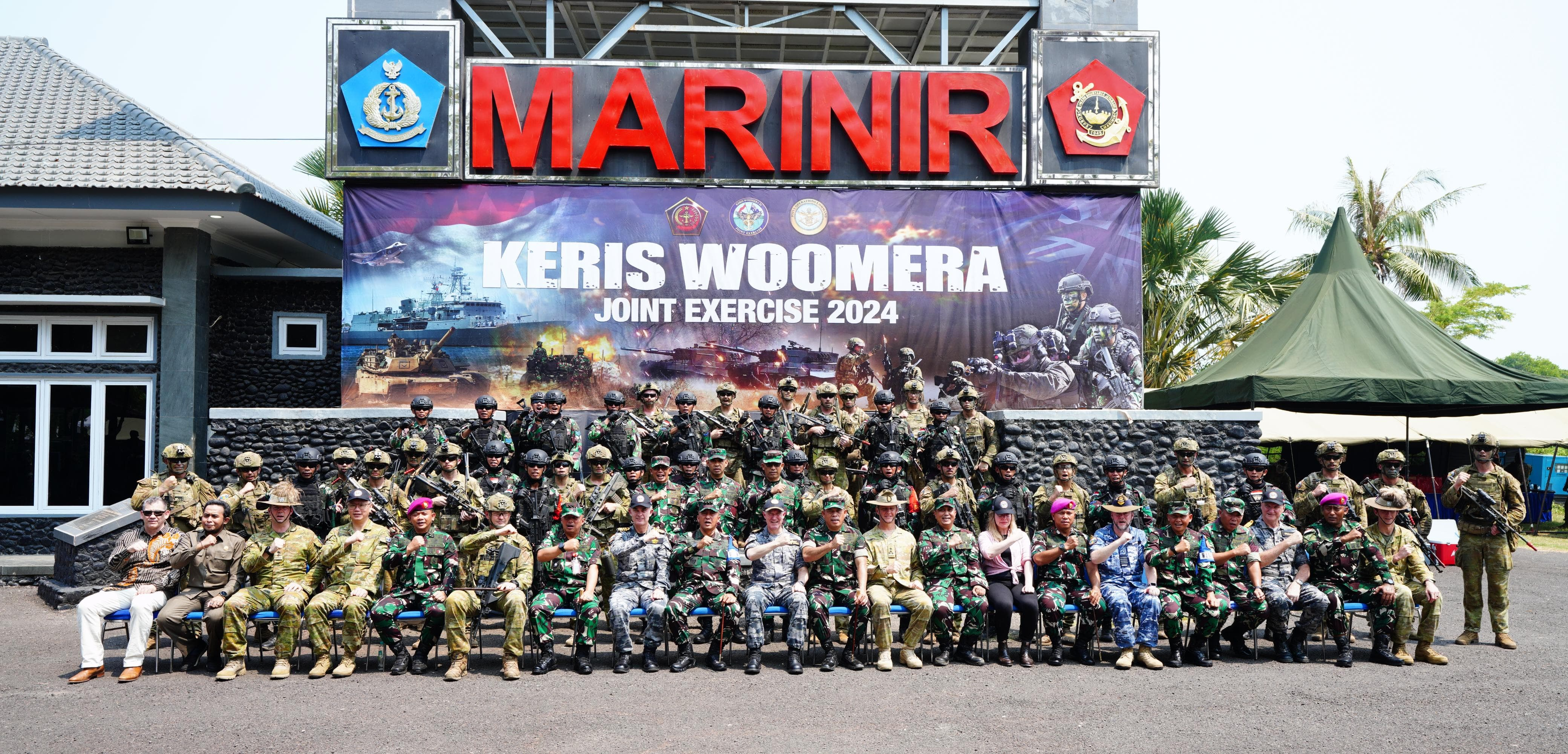
Service members from ADF and TNI, including senior government pose for a foto group during exercise Keris Woomera 2024, Situbondo, East Java, Indonesia.

== See also ==
- Super Garuda Shield
- Exercise Komodo
- Keris MAREX
