= Military exercise =

Employment of military resources for training

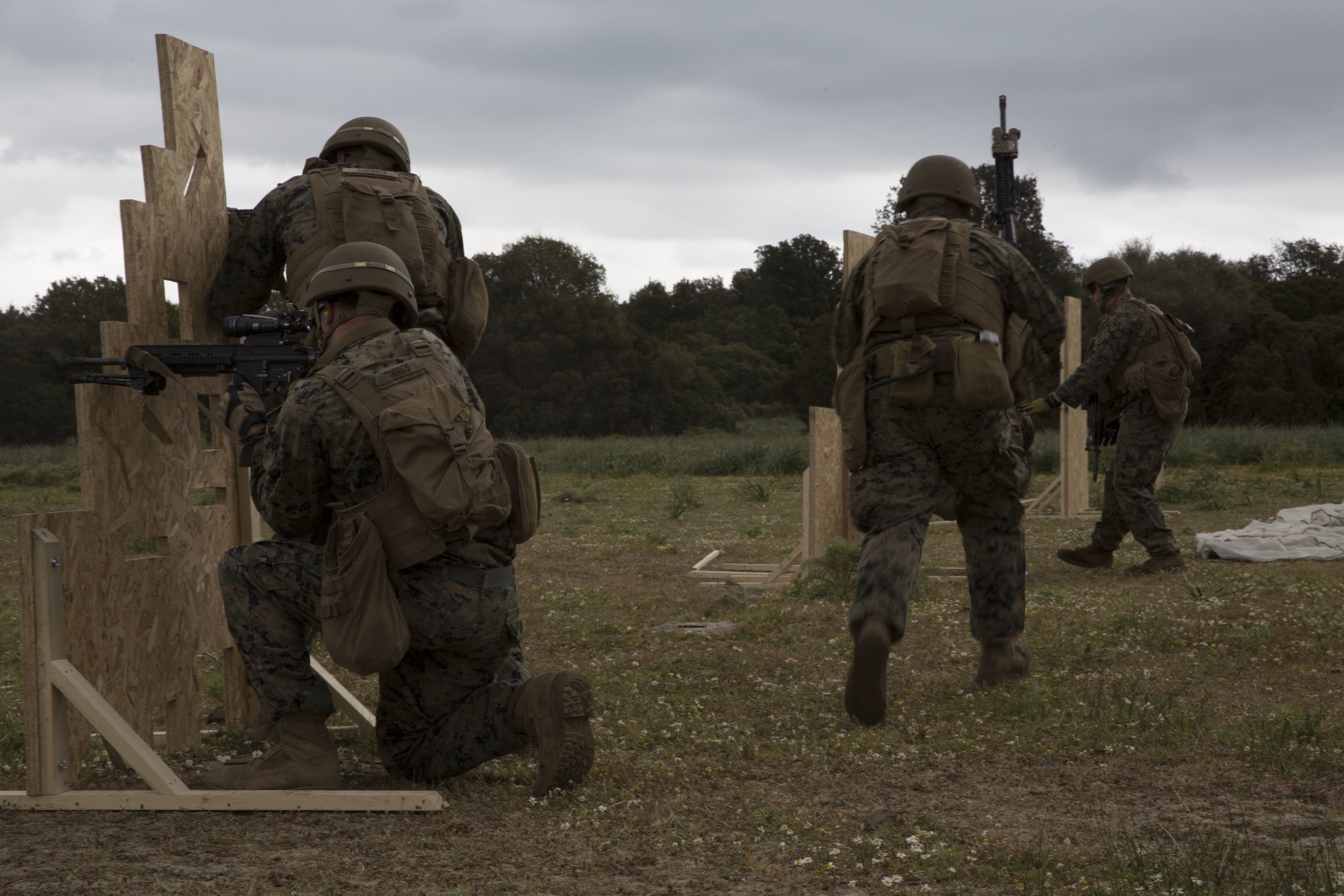
Marines moving between cover during a bilateral military exercise between the United States Marine Corps and Italian Armed Forces, 2019

A military exercise, training exercise, maneuver (American English), manoeuvre (Commonwealth English), drill or war game is the employment of military resources in training for military operations. Military exercises are conducted to explore the effects of warfare or test tactics and strategies without actual combat. They also ensure the combat readiness of garrisoned or deployable forces prior to deployment from a home base.

While both war games and military exercises aim to simulate real conditions and scenarios for the purpose of preparing and analyzing war scenarios, the distinction between a war game and a military exercise is determined, primarily, by the involvement of actual military forces within the simulation, or lack thereof. Military exercises focus on the simulation of real, full-scale military operations in controlled hostile conditions in attempts to reproduce war time decisions and activities for training purposes or to analyze the outcome of possible war time decisions. War games, however, can be much smaller than full-scale military operations, do not typically include the use of functional military equipment, and decisions and actions are carried out by artificial players to simulate possible decisions and actions within an artificial scenario which usually represents a model of a real-world scenario. Additionally, mathematical modeling is used in the simulation of war games to provide a quantifiable method of deduction. However, it is rare that a war game is depended upon for quantitative results, and the use of war games is more often found in situations where qualitative factors of the simulated scenario are needed to be determined.

The actual use of war games and the results that they can provide are limited by possibilities. War games cannot be used to achieve predictive results, as the nature of war and the scenarios that war games aim to simulate are not deterministic. Therefore, war games are primarily used to consider multiple possible outcomes of any given decision, or number of decisions, made in the simulated scenario. These possible outcomes are analyzed and compared, and cause-and-effect relationships are typically sought for the unknown factors within the simulation. It is typically the relationships between visual aspects of the simulation that aid in the assessment of the problems that are simulated within war games, like geographic locations and positionings that would be difficult to discern or analyze at full-scale and for complex environments.

Military exercises involving multiple branches of the same military are known as joint exercises, while military exercises involving two or more countries are known as combined, coalition, bilateral, or multilateral exercises, depending on the nature of the relationship between the countries and the number of them involved. These exercises allow for better coordination between militaries and observation of enemy tactics, and serve as a visible show of strength and cooperation for the participating countries. According to a 2021 study, joint military exercises within well-defined alliances usually deter adversaries without producing a moral hazard because of the narrow scope of the alliance, while joint military exercises outside of an alliance (which are extremely rare) usually lead to conflict escalation.

Exercises in the 20th and 21st centuries have often been identified by a unique code name, such as Cobra Gold, in the same manner as military contingency operations and combat operations like Operation Phantom Fury.

Military exercises are sometimes used as cover for the build up to an actual invasion, as in the cases of the Warsaw Pact invasion of Czechoslovakia and the 2022 Russian invasion of Ukraine, or it can provoke opponents at peace to perceive it as such, as in the case of Able Archer 83.

Military exercise in Ystad, Sweden in 2015

== Types ==
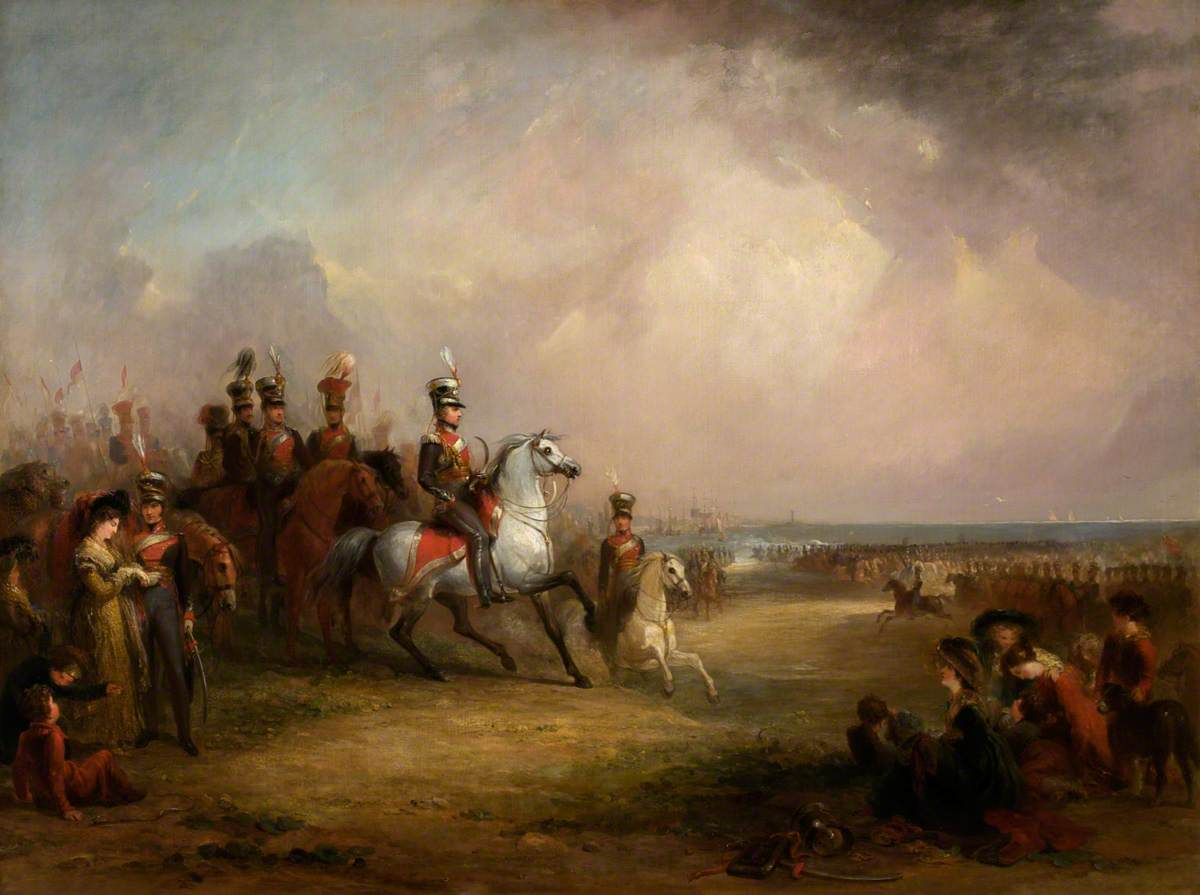
Sir John Leicester and the Cheshire Yeomanry Exercising on the Sands at Liverpool by George Jones, 1824

=== Command post ===
A Command Post Exercise (CPX) typically focuses on the battle readiness of staffs such as a particular Unified Combatant Command or one of its components at any level. It may run in parallel with an FTX or its equivalent, or as a stand-alone event for headquarters staff only with heavy emphasis on simulated events.

=== Field ===
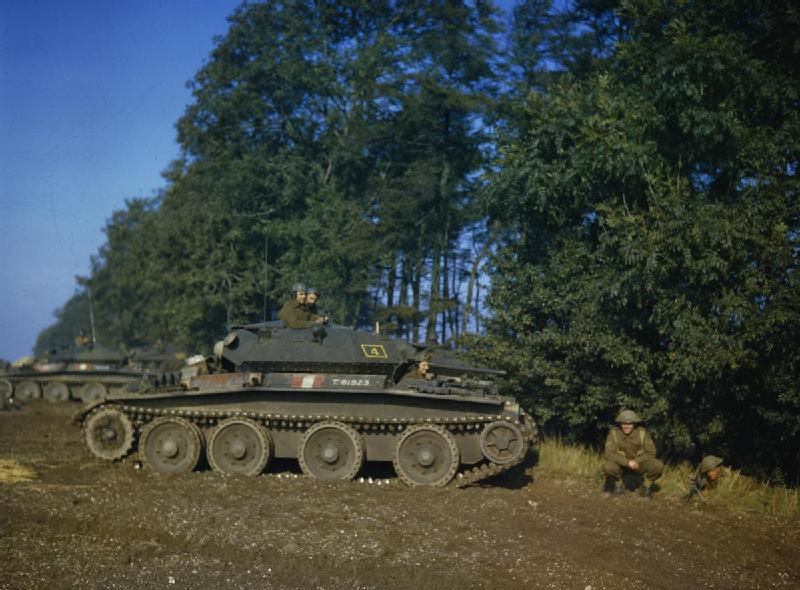
British Army soldiers with a Covenanter tank during a World War II military exercise, 1942

Historical names for the field exercise, or the full-scale rehearsal of military maneuvers as practice for warfare in the military services of the British Commonwealth include "schemes", while those of the military services of the United States are known as Field Training Exercises (FTX), or, in the case of naval forces, Fleet Exercises (FLEETEX). In a field exercise or fleet exercise, the two sides in the simulated battle are typically called "red" (simulating the enemy forces) and "blue", to avoid naming a particular adversary. This naming convention originates with the inventors of the table-top war-game (the "Kriegsspiel"), the Prussian Georg von Reisswitz; their army wore Prussian blue, so friendly forces were depicted by the color blue.

=== Multiple forces ===
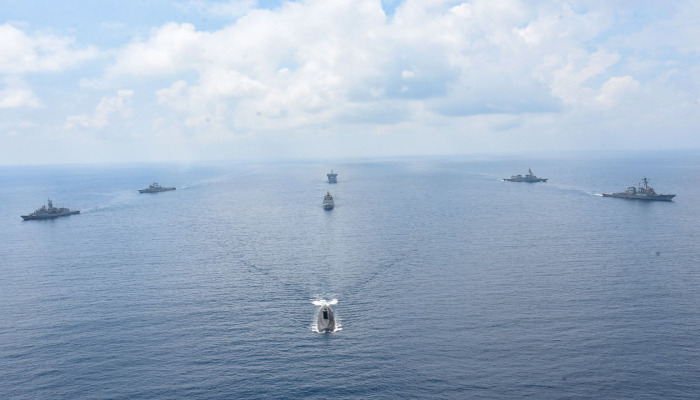
A joint naval exercise between the Indian Navy, United States Navy, Japan Maritime Self-Defense Force, and Royal Australian Navy in 2020

Several different armed forces of the same nation training together are described as having a joint exercise. Those involving forces of multiple nations are described as having a combined exercise or coalition exercise. These are called a bilateral exercise if based on security agreements between two nations, or a multilateral exercise if the agreement is between multiple nations.

=== Simulation ===
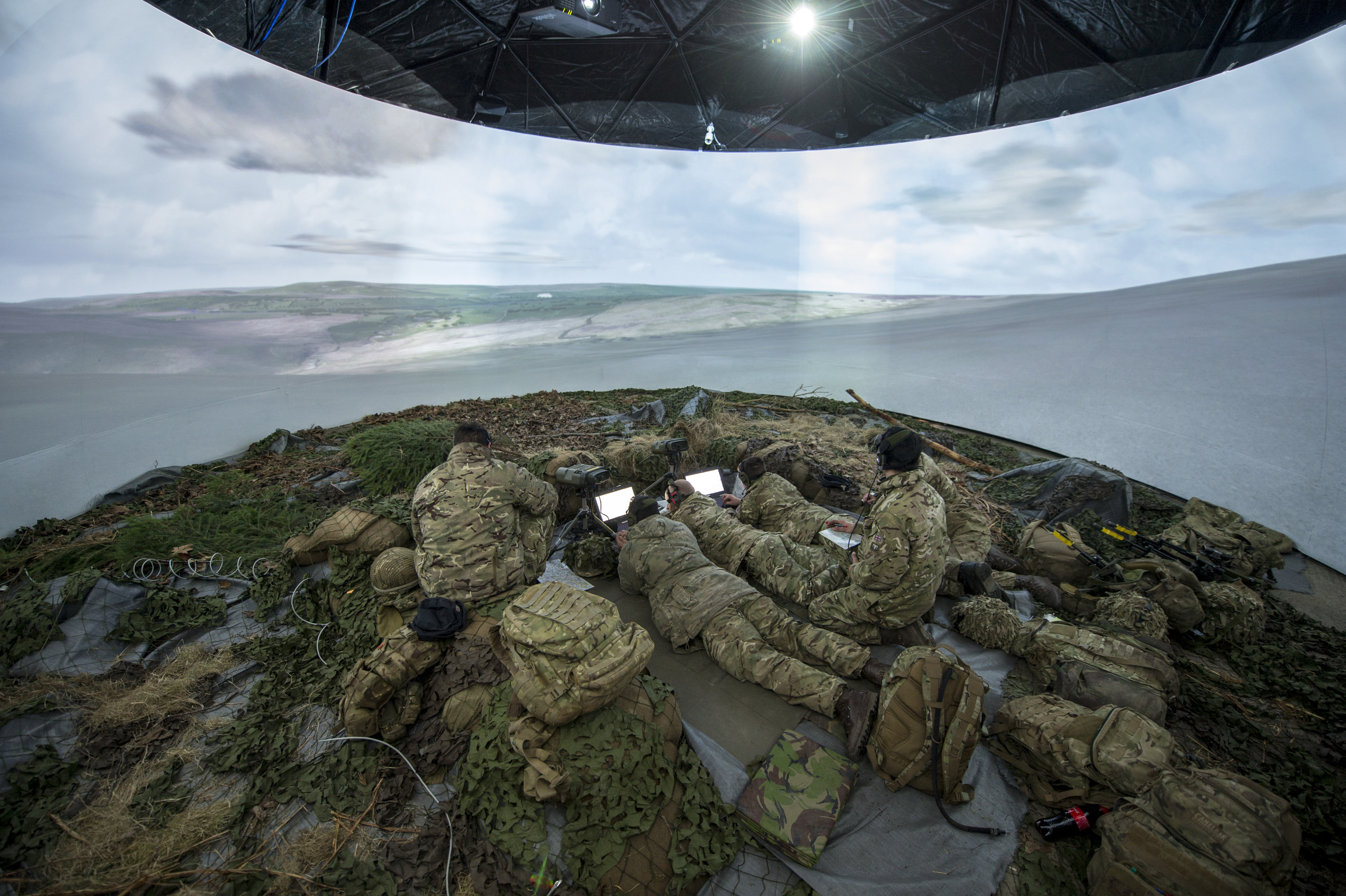
Royal Artillery soldiers training in a virtually simulated area, 2015

Other types of exercise include the Tactical Exercise Without Troops (TEWT), also known as a sand table, map, cloth model, or computer simulation exercise. These allow commanders to manipulate models through possible scenarios in military planning. This is also called warfare simulation, or in some instances a virtual battlefield, and in the past has been described as "wargames". Such examples of modern military wargames include DARWARS, a serious game developed since 2003 by DARPA with BBN Technologies, a defense contractor which was involved in the development of packet switching, used for ARPANET, and which developed the first computer modem in 1963.

Military operations and training have included different scenarios a soldier might encounter with morals and different ethics. In one military operation soldiers are frequently asked to engage in combat, humanitarian, and stabilization roles. These increase the ambiguity of a role one may encounter and challenge of ethics. This also causes military personnel to make difficult decisions in challenging circumstances.

== History ==
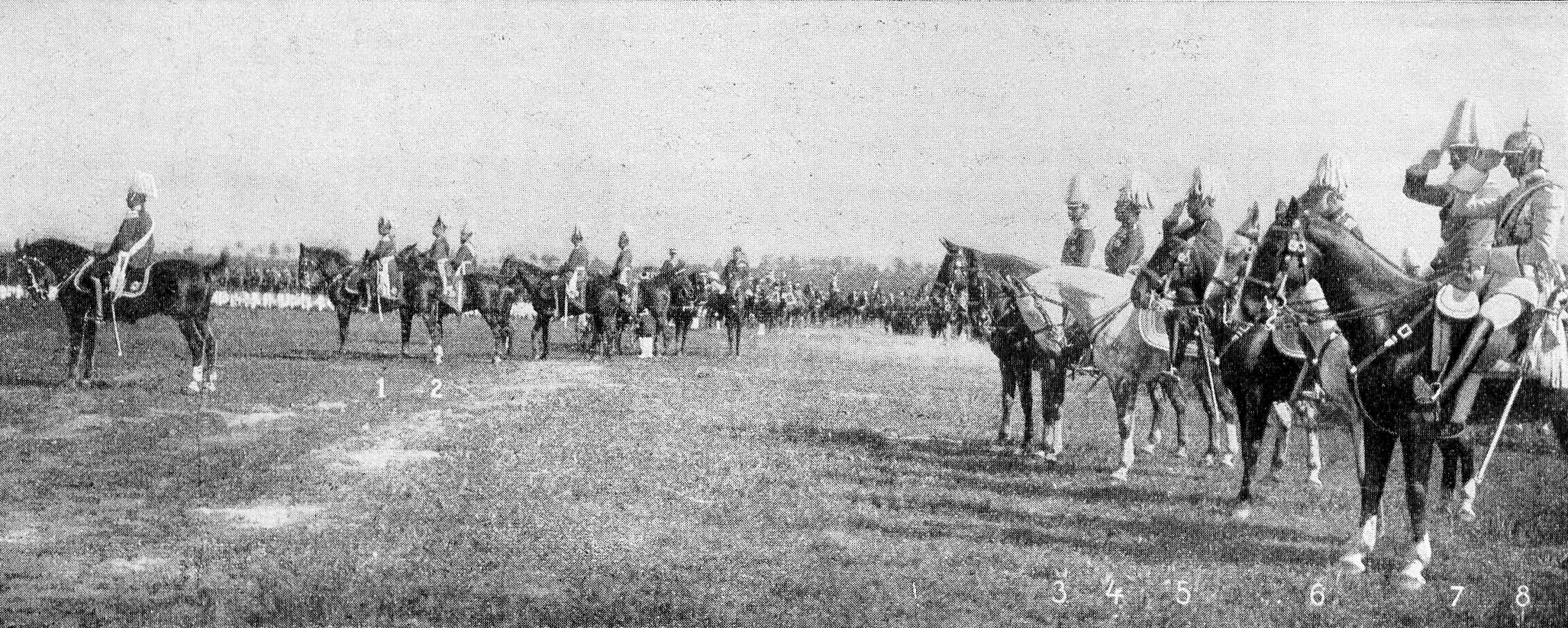
German pre-World War I military exercise Herbstmanöver in southern Germany, autumn 1909 (Emperor Wilhelm II second on the left)

The use of military exercises and war games can be found to date back to as early as the early 19th century, wherein it was the officers of the Prussian Army who created the contemporary, tactical form of wargames that have since been more widely used and developed by other military conglomerations throughout the world. Non-tactical forms of wargames have existed for much longer, however, in the forms of tabletop games such as chess and Go.

The modern use of military exercises grew out of the military need to study warfare and to reenact old battles for learning purposes. During the age of Kabinettskriege (Cabinet wars), Frederick the Great, King of Prussia from 1740 to 1786, "put together his armies as a well-oiled clockwork mechanism whose components were robot-like warriors. No individual initiative was allowed to Frederick's soldiers; their only role was to cooperate in the creation of walls of projectiles through synchronized firepower." This was in the pursuit of a more effective army, and such practices made it easier to look at war from a top-down perspective. Disciplined troops should respond predictably, allowing study to be confined to maneuvers and command.

Prussia's victory over the Second French Empire in the Franco-Prussian War (1870–71) is sometimes partly credited to the training of Prussian officers with the wargame Kriegsspiel, which was invented around 1811 and gained popularity with many officers in the Prussian army. These first wargames were played with dice which represented "friction", or the intrusion of less than ideal circumstances during a real war (including morale, meteorology, the fog of war, etc.).

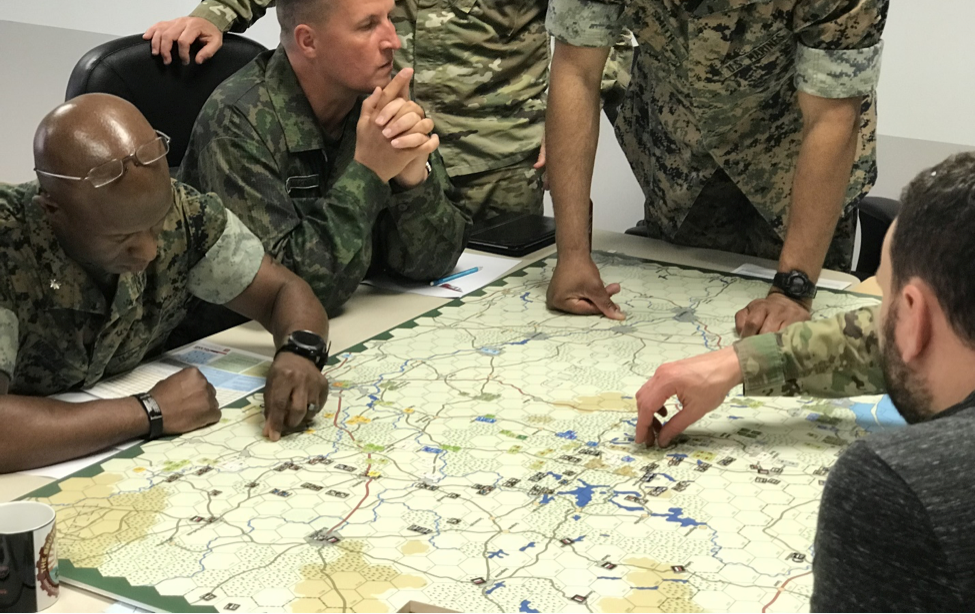
A wargame at the U.S. Marine Corps War College, 2019

"How to Fight the Soviet Tank-Mechanized Infantry Team" (1976) - De-classified US Army military exercise training information reel.

21st century militaries still use wargames to simulate future wars and model their reaction. According to Manuel de Landa, after World War II the Command, Control and Communications (C^{3}) was transferred from the military staff to the RAND Corporation, the first think tank. Around the mid to late 20th century, computer simulated war games were created to replace traditional war gaming methods with the goal of optimizing and speeding up the process and making it possible to analyze more complex scenarios with greater ease. In 1958, the Naval War college installed a computer war game system where their traditional war gaming activities were held. The system was called the Navy Electronic Warfare System, and cost over $10 million to install. The change from traditional war gaming methods to electronic computer simulated ones meant that the value and accuracy of a war game simulation was less dependent on skill and individual experiences, and more dependent on quantitative data and complicated analysis methods.

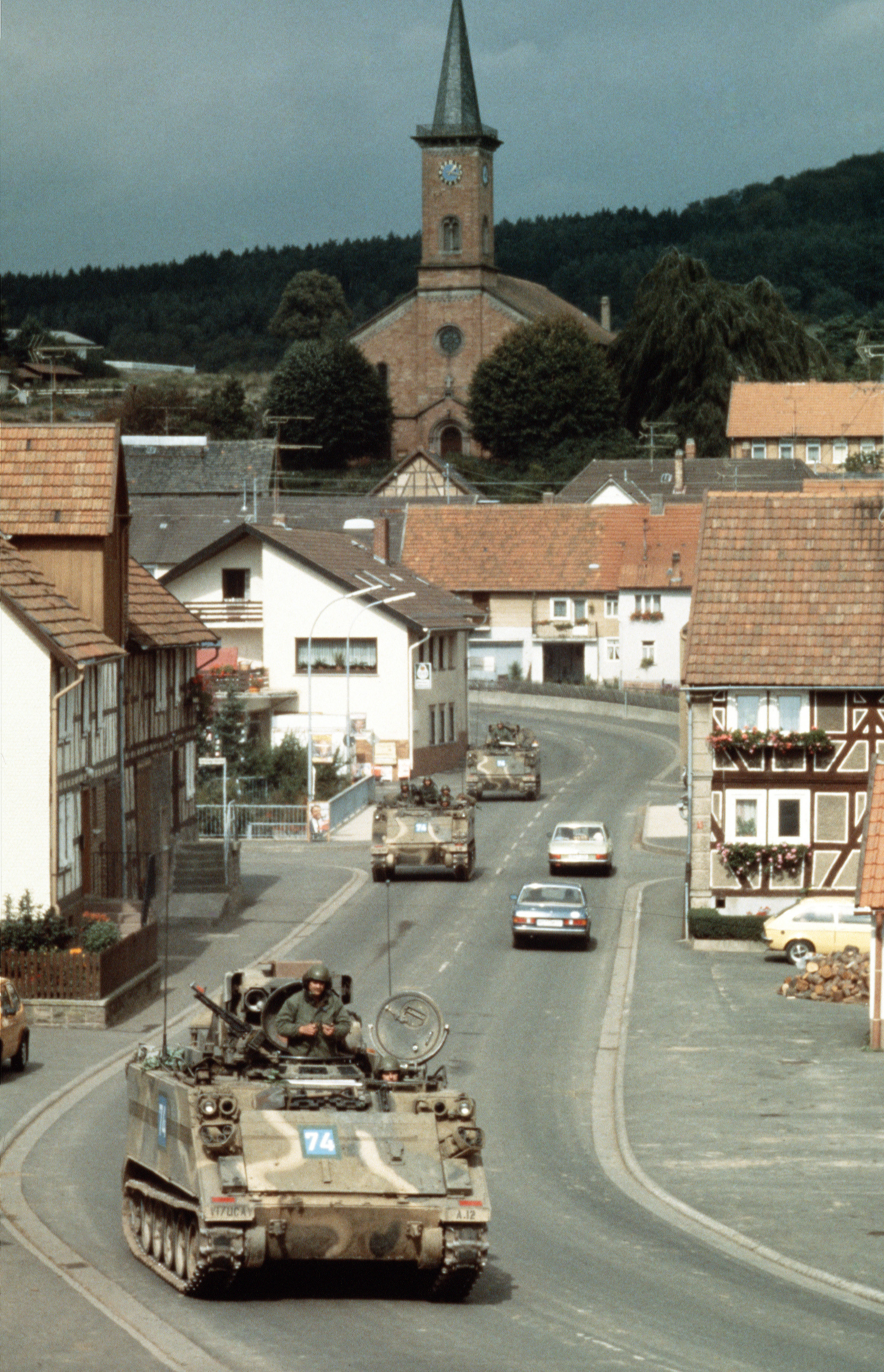
M113 armoured personnel carriers passing civilian traffic in Herbstein, West Germany during Exercise Reforger 83

Von Neumann was employed by the RAND Corporation, and his game theory was used in wargames to model nuclear dissuasion during the Cold War. Thus, the U.S. nuclear strategy was defined using wargames, "SAM" representing the U.S. and "IVAN" representing the Soviet Union.

Early game theory included only zero-sum games, which means that when one player won, the other automatically lost. The prisoner's dilemma, which models the situation of two prisoners in which each one is given the choice to betray or not the other, gave three alternatives to the game:

- Neither prisoners betrays the other, and both are given short-term sentences
- One prisoner betrays the other, and is freed, while the other gets a long sentence
- Both prisoners betray each other, and both are given mid-sized sentences

This model gave the basis for the massive retaliation nuclear doctrine. The zero-sum fallacy and cooperative games would be theorized only later, while the evolution of nuclear technology and missiles made the massive retaliation nuclear strategy obsolete.

== List of military exercises ==
=== Current and recurring ===
| name | host | type | invited participant(s) | focus | first held | frequency |
|---|---|---|---|---|---|---|
| Anatolian Eagle | Turkey | Multilateral | | Aerial warfare | 2001 | No fixed schedule |
| AMAN | Pakistan | Multilateral | | Maritime security | 2007 | Biannual |
| Balikatan | Philippines | Bilateral | | Combined arms | 1991 | Annual |
| BALTOPS | NATO | Multilateral | | Naval warfare | 1971 | Annual |
| Blue Flag | Israel | Bilateral | | Aerial warfare | 2013 | No fixed schedule |
| Bright Star | Egypt | Bilateral | | Combined arms | 1980 | Biannual |
| CARAT | United States | Bilateral | ASEAN members | Naval warfare, Combined arms | 1995 | Annual |
| Caucasus exercises | Russia | Multilateral | | Combined arms | 2006 | Approx. every 4 years |
| Centre exercises | Russia | Joint | | Combined arms | 2011 | Every 4 years |
| Cobra Gold | Thailand | Multilateral | | Combined arms, military simulation, humanitarian aid and disaster relief | 1982 | Annual |
| Cold Response | NATO (Norway) | Multilateral | | Defence readiness | 2006 | Biannual |
| Cope West | Indonesia | Bilateral | United States | Aerial Warfare | 1989 | Previously no fixed schedule (1989, 2010, 2012). Annual (2016–present) |
| Croix du Sud | France | Multilateral | | Humanitarian aid and disaster relief | 2002 | Biannual |
| Dynamic Manta | NATO | Multilateral | | Naval warfare | 2006 | Annual |
| Green Dagger | United States | Multilateral | | Infantry combat | 2019 | Annual |
| Keris MAREX | Indonesia | Bilateral | United States | Marine exercise | 2022 | Annual |
| Keris Woomera | Australia; Indonesia | Bilateral | Australia and Indonesia | Combined arms, humanitarian assistance, and disaster relief evacuation. | 2024 | Biennial |
| Komodo Exercise | Indonesia | Multilateral | Australia, France, India, Italy, Japan, Malaysia, Pakistan, Philippines, Russia, Singapore, South Korea, Thailand, United Kingdom, United States and Vietnam (2025). | Naval Warfare | 2014 | Annual |
| Malabar | India | Multilateral | | Naval warfare, maritime security | 1992 | Annual |
| Maple Flag | Canada | Multilateral | United Kingdom, United States | Aerial combat | 1978 | Annual |
| Pitch Black | Australia | Multilateral | Brunei, Canada, Fiji, France, Germany, India, Indonesia, Italy, Japan, Malaysia, New Zealand, Papua New Guinea, Philippines, Singapore, South Korea, Spain, Thailand, United Kingdom and United States (2024). | Aerial warfare | 1981 | Biennial |
| Real Thaw | Portugal | Multilateral | | Aerial combat | 2009 | Annual |
| Red Flag | United States | Multilateral | | Aerial combat | 1975 | Triennial / biannual |
| Red Flag – Alaska | United States | Multilateral | | Aerial warfare | 2006 | Triennial / quad-annual |
| Resolute Dragon | Japan | Bilateral | United States | Defence readiness, command and control. | 2021 | Annual |
| RIMPAC | United States | Multilateral | Australia, Beligian, Brazil, Brunei, Canada, Chile, Colombia, Denmark, Ecuador, France, Germany, India, Indonesia, Israel, Italia, Japan, Malaysia, Mexico, Netherlands, New Zealand, Peru, Philippines, Singapore, South Korea, Sri Lanka, Thailand, Tonga and United Kingdom (2024). | Naval warfare, maritime security. | 1971 | Biannual |
| Saif Sareea | Oman | Bilateral | United Kingdom | Combined arms | 1986 | No fixed schedule |
| Super Garuda Shield | Indonesia | Multilateral | Australia, Brazil, Canada, France, Germany, Japan, Netherlands, New Zealand, Singapore, South Korea, United Kingdom, United States (2025). | Combined arms, command post, humanitarian aid and disaster relief | 2007 | Annual |
| Talisman Saber | Australia | Bilateral | United Kingdom, United States | Combined arms; combat readiness | 2005 | Biannual |
| Varuna | India | Bilateral | | Naval warfare | 1993 | Annual |
| Vostok Exercises | Russia | Joint | | Combat readiness; command and control | 2010 | Every 4 years |
| Zapad | Russia, Soviet Union | Joint | | Varying focuses | 1981 | Approx. every 4 years |
| name | host | type | invited participant(s) | focus | first held | frequency |

=== Former, significant ===
| name | host | type | invited participant(s) | focus | held | frequency | significance |
|---|---|---|---|---|---|---|---|
| Fleet problem | United States | joint | | naval warfare | 1923–1941, 2014–2021 | no fixed schedule | bulk of U.S. Navy exercises in the interwar period until World War II |
| Carolina Maneuvers | United States | joint | | warfare strategy | 1941 | standalone | involved approximately 350,000 soldiers |
| Louisiana Maneuvers | United States | joint | | warfare strategy | 1941 | standalone | involved approximately 400,000 soldiers, including several officers who would become prominent military leaders during World War II |
| Exercise Spartan | United Kingdom | joint | Canada, United States | invasion readiness | 1943 | standalone | provided Allied military leadership vital planning for Operation Market Garden and Operation Overlord |
| Reforger | NATO (West Germany) | multilateral | West Germany, United Kingdom, United States | combat readiness | 1969–1988, 1990–1993 | annual | display of preparedness in the event of war between NATO and the Warsaw Pact |
| North China Military Exercise | China | joint | | unknown | 1981 | standalone | involved over 114,000 soldiers; the largest Chinese military exercise up to that point |
| Able Archer | NATO | multilateral, command post | | combat readiness, nuclear warfare | unknown | annual | Able Archer 83 was mistakenly perceived by the Soviet Union to be genuine NATO war preparations |
| Brasstacks | India | joint | | combined arms | 1986–1987 | standalone | involved approximately 500,000 soldiers; the largest military exercise on the Indian subcontinent in history |
| Millennium Challenge | United States | simulation | | warfare strategy | 2002 | standalone | restarted after Blueforce (representing the U.S.) was quickly defeated by Redforce (representing Iran or Iraq), with a new rule limiting Redforce's capabilities and favouring Blueforce, caused controversy when Blueforce won |
| Caucasus 2009 | Russia | joint | | combat readiness | 2009 | standalone | conducted as a show of force against Georgia after the Russo-Georgian War |
| Union Resolve 2022 | Russia | bilateral | | combined arms, warfare strategy | 2022 | standalone | a deception by Russia for mobilisation prior to the Russian invasion of Ukraine |
| 2022 Chinese military exercises around Taiwan | China, Taiwan | joint (not involving Taiwan) | | naval warfare; combined arms | 2022 | standalone | conducted as a show of force against the U.S. to deter American influence in Taiwan, shortly after U.S. Speaker of the House Nancy Pelosi's visit to Taiwan |
| name | host | type | invited participant(s) | focus | held | frequency | significance |

== See also ==
- Aggressor squadron
- Maneuver warfare
- Flanking maneuver
- Live fire exercise
- Pincer movement
- Simulation
