= KRI Makassar =

Makassar-class landing platform dock

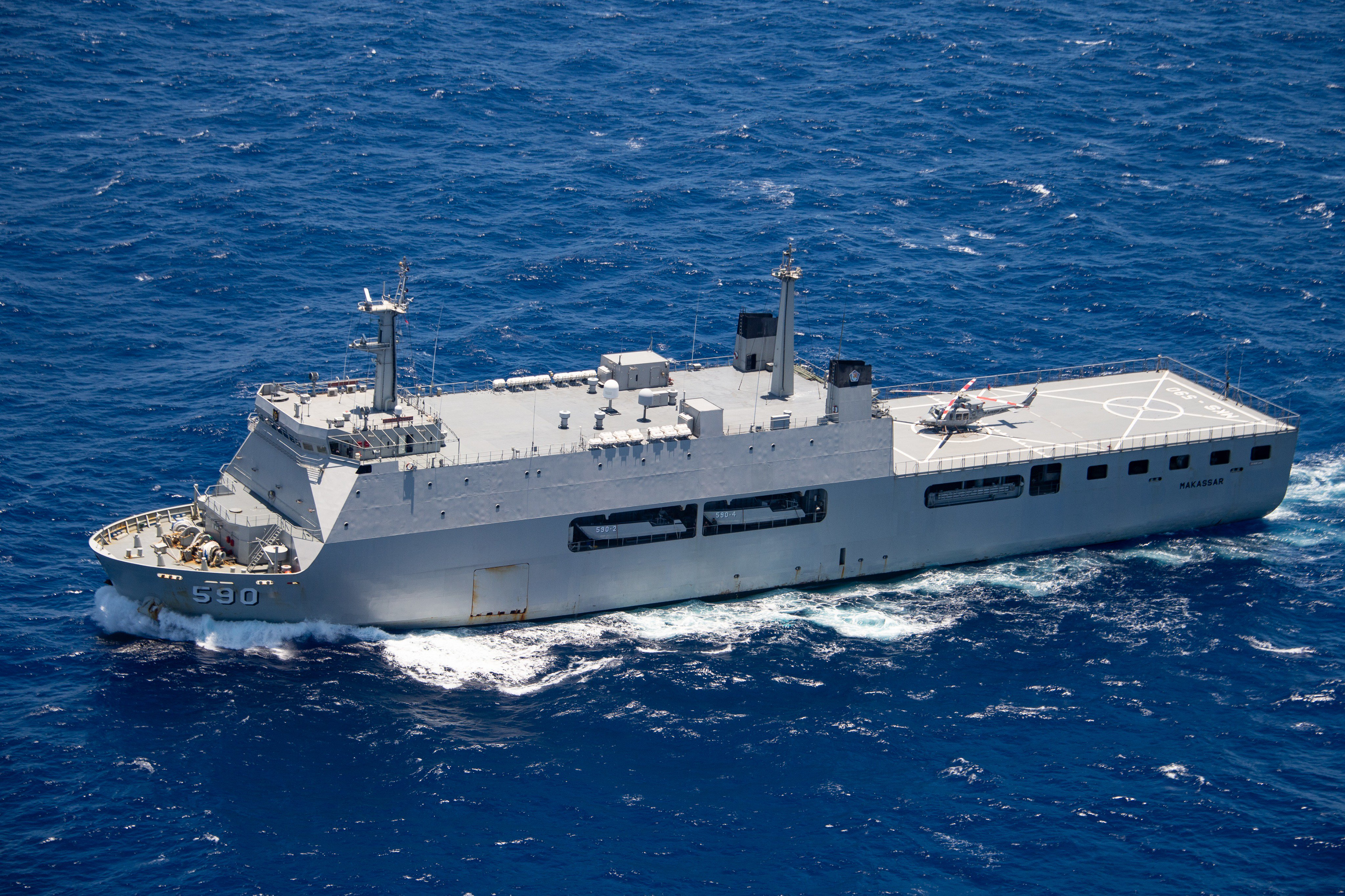
- KRI Makassar (590) sails with partner nations during RIMPAC 2018.

History

Indonesia
- Name: Makassar
- Namesake: Makassar
- Ordered: December 2004
- Builder: DSME, Busan
- Launched: 7 December 2006
- Commissioned: 29 April 2007
- Identification: Pennant number: 590
- Status: Active

General characteristics
- Class & type: Makassar-class landing platform dock
- Tonnage: 12,400 tons
- Displacement: 11,300 tons standard displacement; 15,994 tons full displacement
- Length: 122 meters
- Beam: 22 meters
- Height: 56 meters
- Draft: 4.9 meters
- Decks: (Tank Deck); 6.7 meter,(Truck Deck); 11.3 meter
- Propulsion: CODAD, 2 shafts; 2 × MAN B&W 8L28/32A diesel rated at 2666 BHP/1960 kW@ 775 RPM
- Speed: Maximum: 16 knots; Cruising: 14 knots; Economy: 12 knots
- Range: 30 days, up to 10,000 Nm
- Endurance: +45 days
- Boats & landing craft carried: 2 x LCVP
- Capacity: up to 35 infantry vehicles
- Troops: 354 troops
- Complement: accommodations up to 507 persons
- Crew: 126 crew
- Armament: 1 x Leonardo OTO Twin 40L70 Compact (Stealth); 2 x 20mm Oerlikon; 2 x Mistral Simbad
- Aircraft carried: Up to 5 helicopters
- Aviation facilities: 2 helideck spot (Medium-sized helicopters)

KRI Makassar (590) is the lead ship of the Makassar-class landing platform dock of the Indonesian Navy.

== Development and design ==
Indonesia signed a US$150 million contract in December 2004 and the first two units were built in Busan, South Korea. The remaining two were built at Indonesia's PT PAL shipyard in Surabaya with assistance from Daesun.The contract for the 3rd and 4th LPD to be built in Indonesia was signed with PT PAL on March 28, 2005.

On 19 October 2006, the first of the two Indonesian-built units, was laid down in a ceremony by Admiral Slamet Subiyanto, Chief of Staff, Indonesian Navy. The 3rd and 4th units had been designed to function as flagships with provisions for a command and control system, 57mm gun and air defence systems.

The 5th ship ordered by Indonesian navy on January 11, 2017. First steel cutting ceremony for said ship was conducted on April 28, 2017. The ship's keel was laid on August 28. 2017.

== Construction and career ==
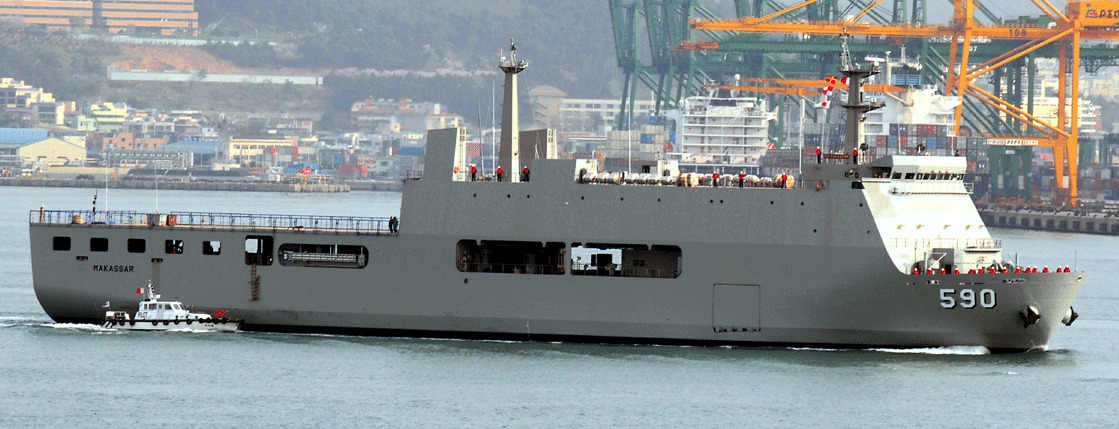
KRI Makassar (590) circa 2007.

Makassar was laid down and launched on 7 December 2006 by DSME at Busan. She was commissioned on 29 April 2007.

On 9 December 2012 and in early January 2013, KRI Makassar arrived at Davao, Mindanao, Philippines to deliver humanitarian aid for Typhoon Bopha disaster-affected Filipinos; coursing the assistance through the Armed Forces of the Philippines.

KRI Makassar arrived at Pearl Harbor on 26 June 2018 in preparation for RIMPAC 2018 from 27 June to 2 August.

In November 2021, KRI Makassar participated in the exercise Cooperation Afloat Readiness and Training (CARAT) Indonesia 2021 with United States Pacific Fleet.

In 26 August to 6 September 2024, KRI Makassar participated with partner nations in the multinational military exercise Super Garuda Shield 2024.

In 1 to 17 November 2024, KRI Makassar participated in the bilateral military exercise Keris Woomera 2024 with Australian Defence Force (ADF).

In 25 August to 3 September 2025, she participated again with partner nations in the multinational military exercise Super Garuda Shield 2025.

== Gallery ==
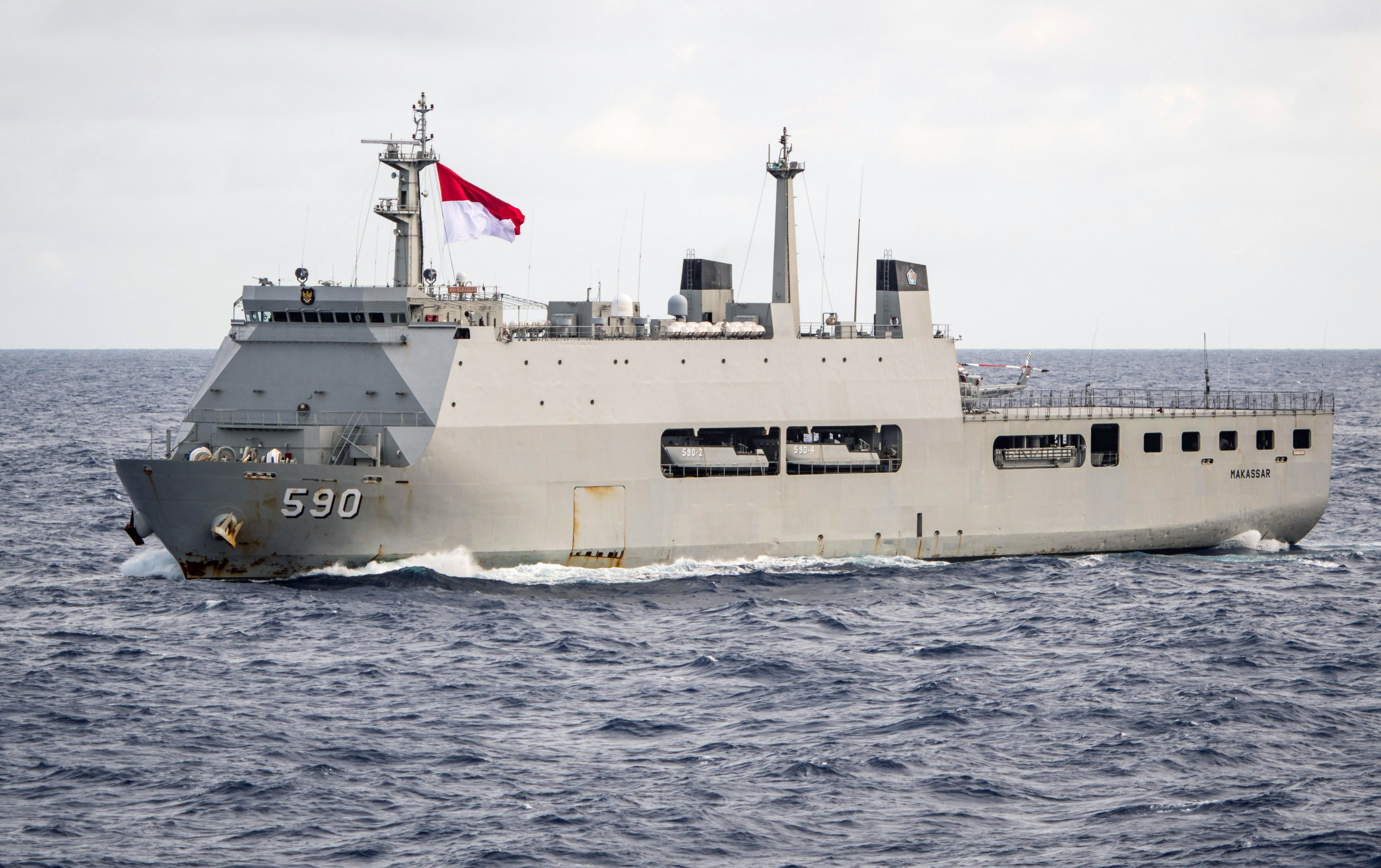
KRI Makassar (590) underway during RIMPAC 2018.
