= Keris MAREX =

Annual U.S. Marine Corps-Indonesian Marine Corps joint military exercise

Keris Marine Exercise
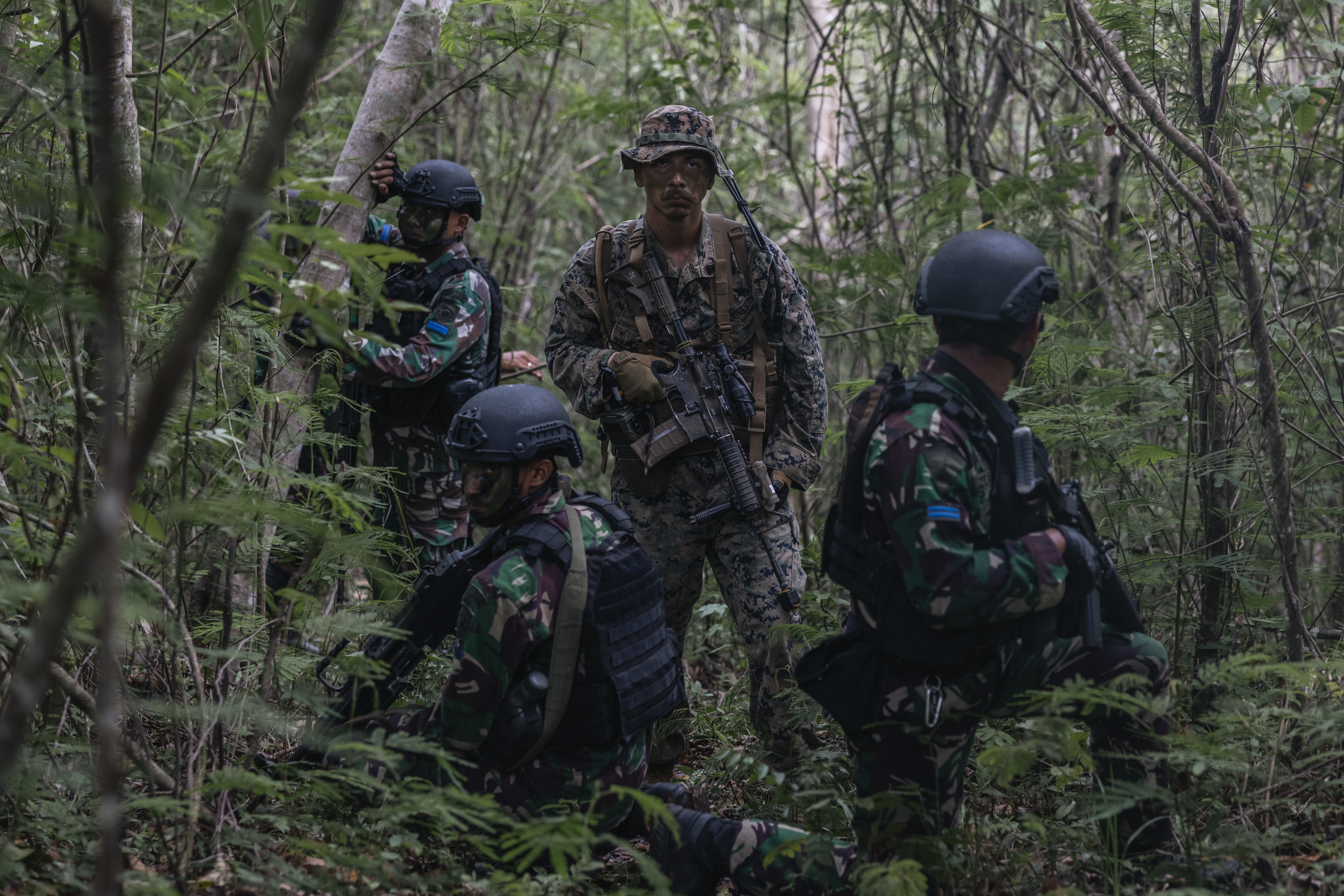
- U.S. Marine Corps and Indonesian marines, conduct tactical operations during Keris Marine Exercise 2023.
- Status: Active
- Genre: Bilateral military exercise
- Frequency: Annual
- Location: Indonesia
- Years active: 2022–present
- Participants: Indonesia; United States
- Organizer: United States Marine Corps; Indonesian Marine Corps

Keris Marine Exercise (Keris MAREX) is a two-week bilateral military exercise between the Indonesian Marine Corps (Indonesian: Korps Marinir Republik Indonesia, or KORMAR RI) and the United States Marine Corps (USMC) focusing on strengthening partnership and aims to enhance military interoperability between forces, foster strong working relationships as Marine partners, and ensure regional stability and security in the Indo-Pacific. Keris MAREX is annually conducted since 2022 in Indonesia.

== Overview ==
The first Keris Marine Exercise (Keris MAREX) was inaugurated in 2022. The primary objectives of the Keris Marine Exercise (MAREX) are to enhance military interoperability, strengthen the relationship between the U.S. and Indonesian Marine Corps, and promote regional stability and security in the Indo-Pacific.

The exercise focuses on improving maritime domain awareness, expanding military capabilities, and advancing a Free and Open Indo-Pacific.

Additionally, Keris MAREX aims to foster strong working relationships, develop bilateral problem-solving techniques, and forge bonds of friendship between the participating forces.

== Keris MAREX 2022 ==
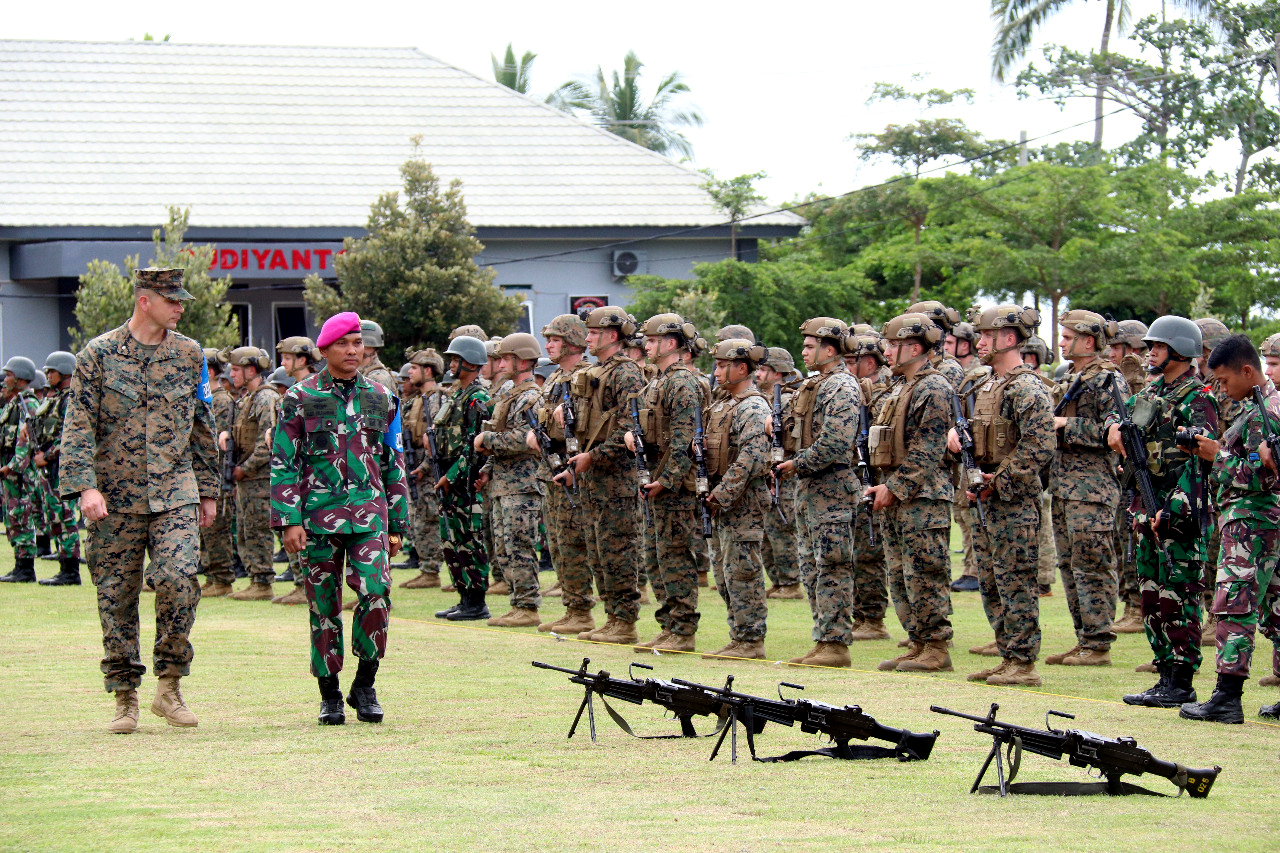
U.S. marines from Marine Rotational Force-Southeast Asia (MRF-SEA), I Marine Expeditionary Force, and Indonesian marines from 7th Marine Infantry Battalion, 4th Marine Brigade, held the Opening Ceremony of Keris Marine Exercise (Keris MAREX) at the field of 7th Marine Infantry Battalion, Ketapang, Pesawaran, Lampung, 10 November 2022.

The inaugural of Keris MAREX bilateral exercise, led by the United States Marine Corps (USMC) and Korps Marinir Republik Indonesia (KORMAR), promotes military interoperability and maritime domain awareness capabilities, strengthens relationships, and expands capabilities among participating forces. The opening ceremony of the Keris MAREX 2022 was led by the Commander of the 7th Marine Infantry Battalion for 4th Marine Infantry Brigade, Lt. Col. Alex Zulkarnain as the Task Force Commander of Joint Exercise Keris MAREX 2022, accompanied by Lt. Col. Jonathan Wagner, 11th MEU Operation Officer for Marine Rotational Force-Southeast Asia (MRF-SEA), I Marine Expeditionary Force at the field of the 7th Marine Infantry Battalion (Yonif 7 Marinir) Command Headquarters, Ketapang, Pesawaran Regency, Thursday, 10 November 2022.

Marine forces from the U.S. Military and Indonesian National Armed Forces (TNI) held the Keris MAREX 2022 from 11 to 25 November 2022, at Piabung training area, in Pesawaran Regency, Lampung, Indonesia. Throughout Keris MAREX 2022, approximately 180 U.S. Marines from the Marine Rotational Force-Southeast Asia (MRF-SEA) force and 260 KORMAR Marines from the 7th Marine Infantry Battalion have trained closely together.

The exercise activities focused on increasing combined capabilities for coastal defense, joint fires, rocket artillery, small unmanned aerial systems, and cultural and community engagements. The exercise includes a variety of training evolutions such as patrolling, close-quarters battle and ambushing, unmanned aircraft systems employment, sensor to strike, tactical combat casualty care, and explosive ordnance disposal. Exchanges of various functional areas include joint planning, expeditionary advanced basing operations, joint planning operations, and small boat operations. The exercise culminated with a mission rehearsal to increase interoperability and display emerging maritime domain awareness capabilities.

== Keris MAREX 2023 ==
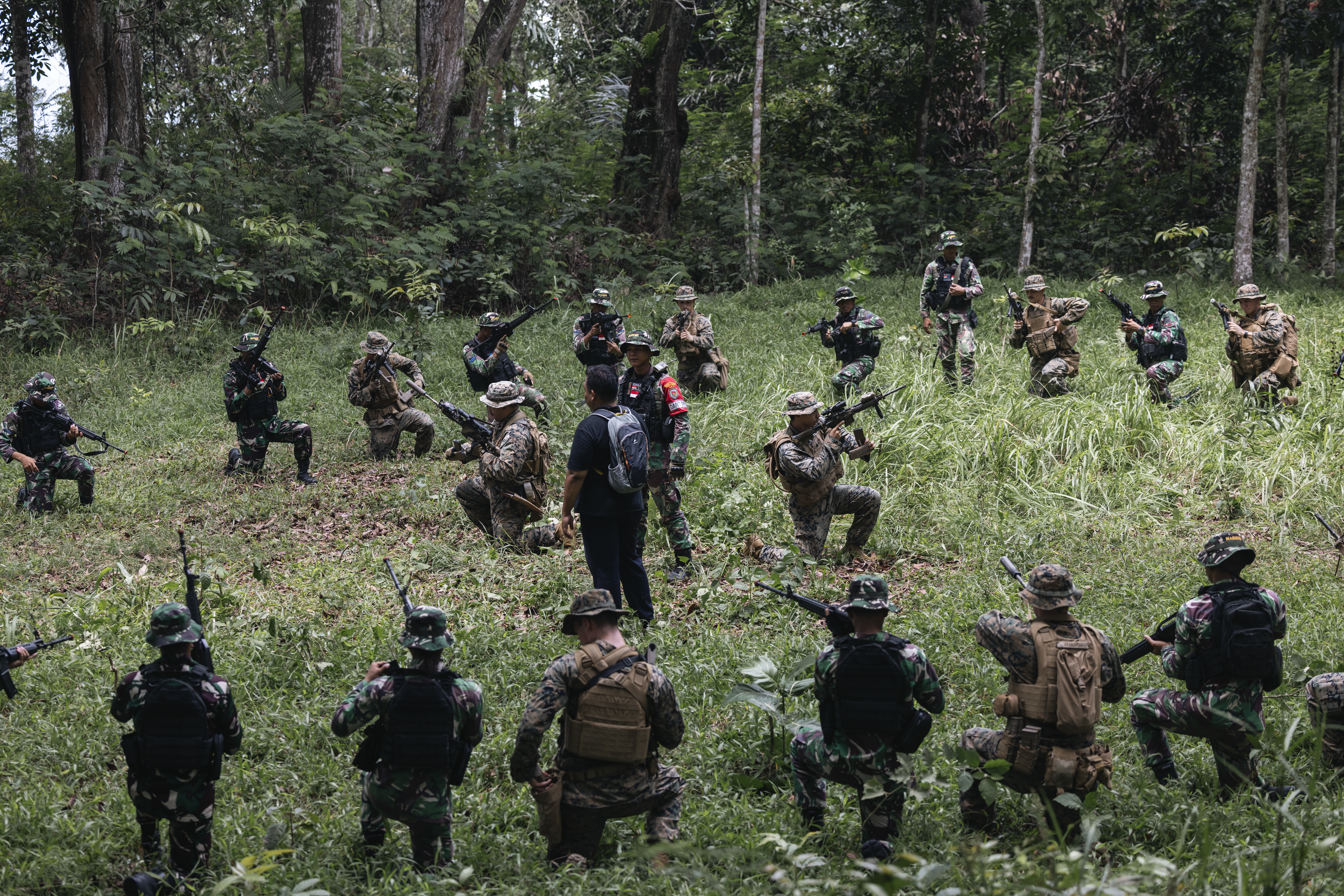
U.S. Marines with 1st Battalion, 7th Marines, attached to Marine Rotational Force-Southeast Asia and Indonesian marines with 4th Marine Infantry Brigade, Pasmar 1, conduct a period of instruction on weapons handling during Keris Marine Exercise 2023 at Piabung Training Area in Sukabumi, West Java, Indonesia, 27 November 2023.

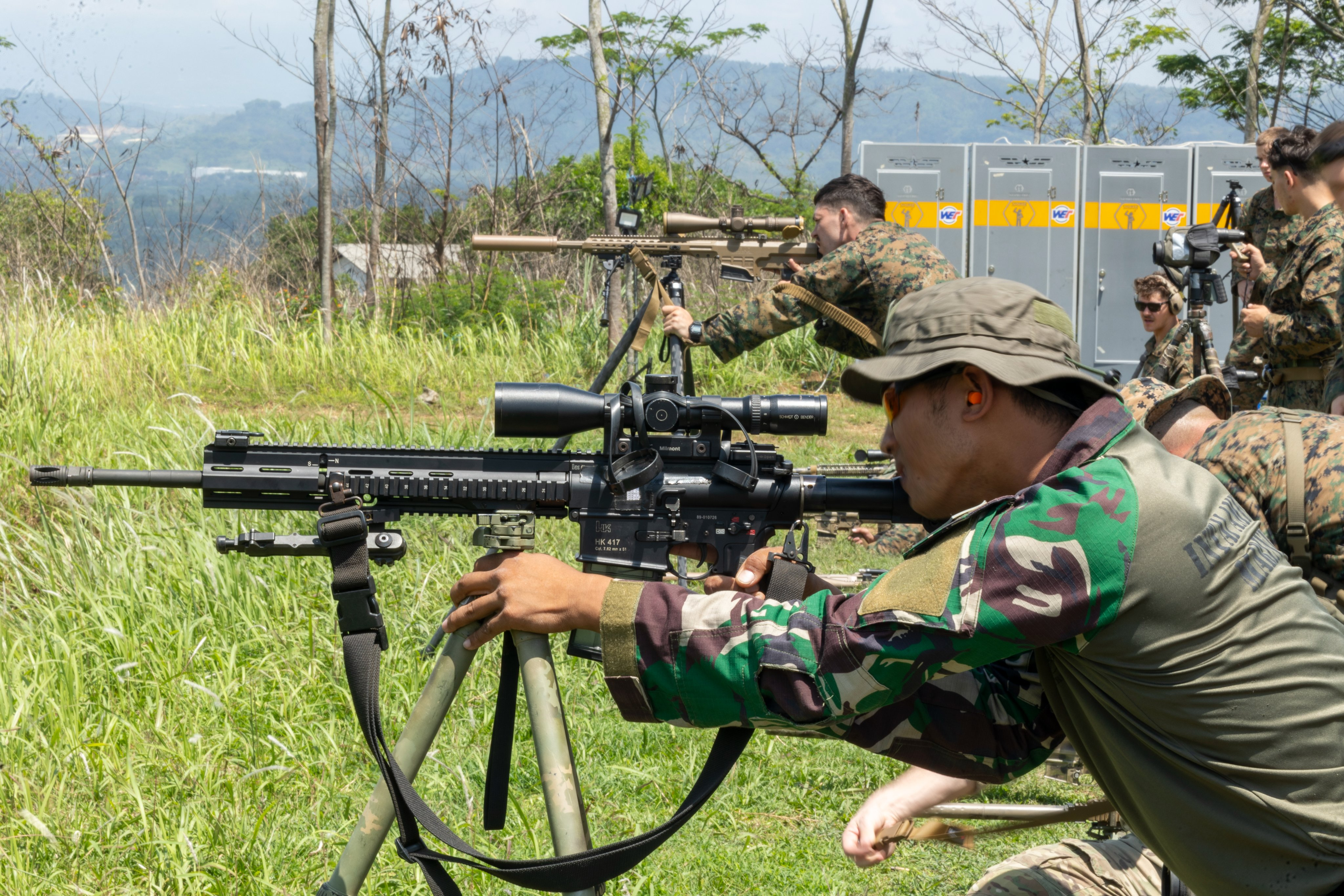
An Indonesian marine with 4th Marine Infantry Battalion, Pasmar 1, sights in on an HK417 semi-automatic sniper rifle, and an U.S. marine with 1st Battalion, 7th Marine Regiment, attached to Marine Rotational Force-Southeast Asia sights in on an MK22 rifle at precision marksmanship training during Keris Marine Exercise 2023 at Piabung Training Area in Sukabumi, West Java, Indonesia, 2 December 2023.

Joint exercise Keris Marex 2023 between the Indonesian Marine Corps (KORMAR) and the United States Marine Corps (USMC) from United States Marine Corps Force Pacific (MAFORFAC) was officially opened in a ceremony at the 6th Marine Combat Training Center (Puslatpurmar 6), Antralina Football Field, Jampang, Sukabumi, West Java, Thursday, 23 November 2023. Acting as the Inspector of the opening ceremony this time was the Commander of the 4th Marine Infantry Battalion Lt. Col. Arief Bastian Sanusi Chaniago as the Task Force Commander of Joint Exercise Keris Marex 2023, accompanied by Lt. Col. Jonathan Wagner, 11th MEU Operation Officer for Marine Rotational Force-Southeast Asia (MRF-SEA), I Marine Expeditionary Force.

Indonesian Marine Corps, or Korps Marinir (KORMAR), and U.S. Marine Corps conducted the Keris Marine Exercise (Keris MAREX) 2023 from 23 November to 11 December 2023 at Piabung Training Area, Sukabumi Regency, West Java, Indonesia.

Approximately 150 U.S. Marines and 150 Indonesian Marines personnel from 4th Marine Infantry Brigade, 1st Marine Force (Pasmar 1), participated in this Keris MAREX 2023 to enhance coastal defense, joint fires, crew-served weapons, and small unmanned aerial system combined capabilities. Participants also conducted community engagement events and subject matter expert exchanges to further our combined commitment to regional security and cooperation.

== Keris MAREX 2024 ==
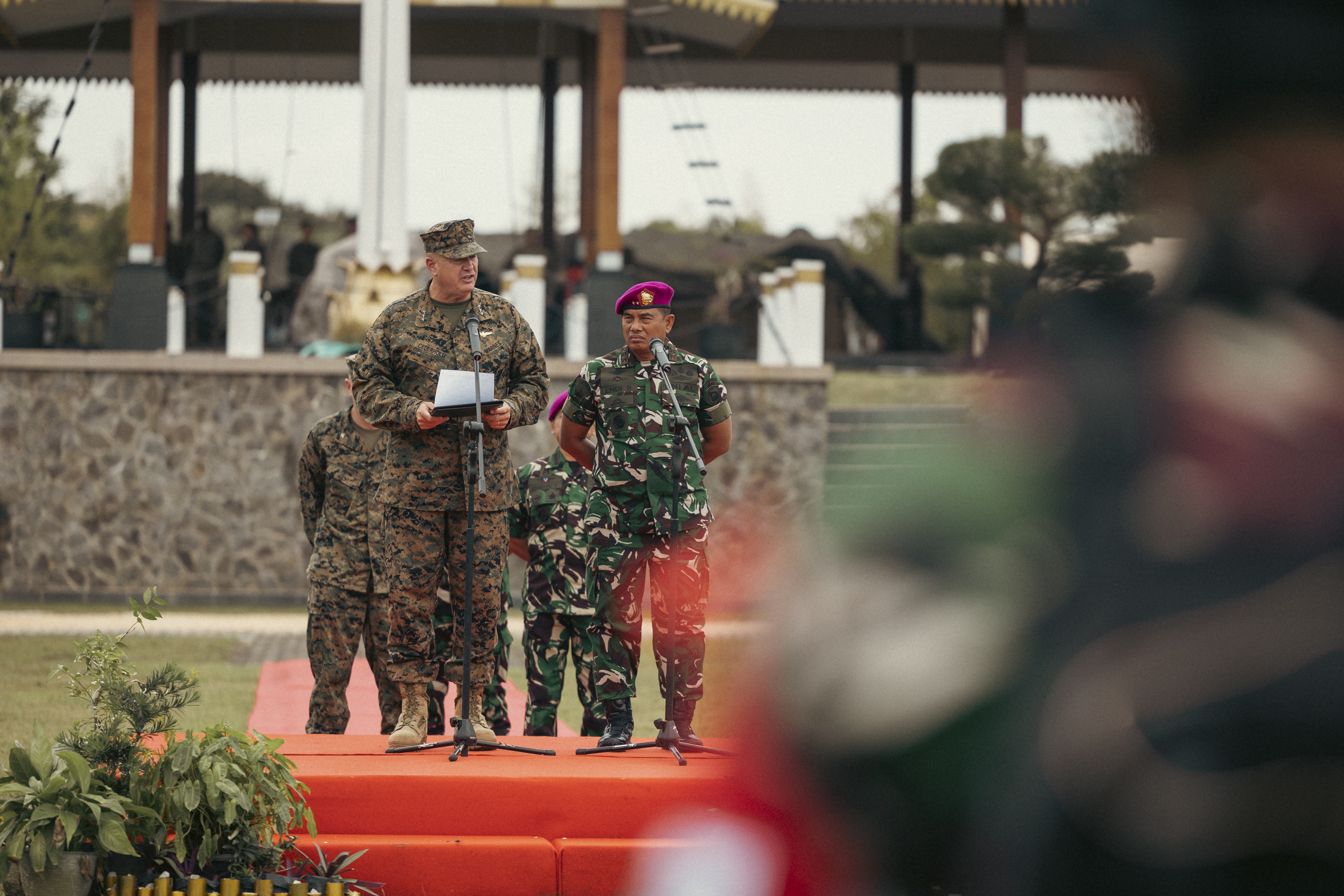
U.S. Marine Corps Lt. Gen. Michael S. Cederholm, I Marine Expeditionary Force commanding general, delivers remarks during the Keris Marine Exercise (MAREX) 2024 Opening Ceremony at Yonif 10 Marinir, Batam, Indonesia, 6 November 2024.

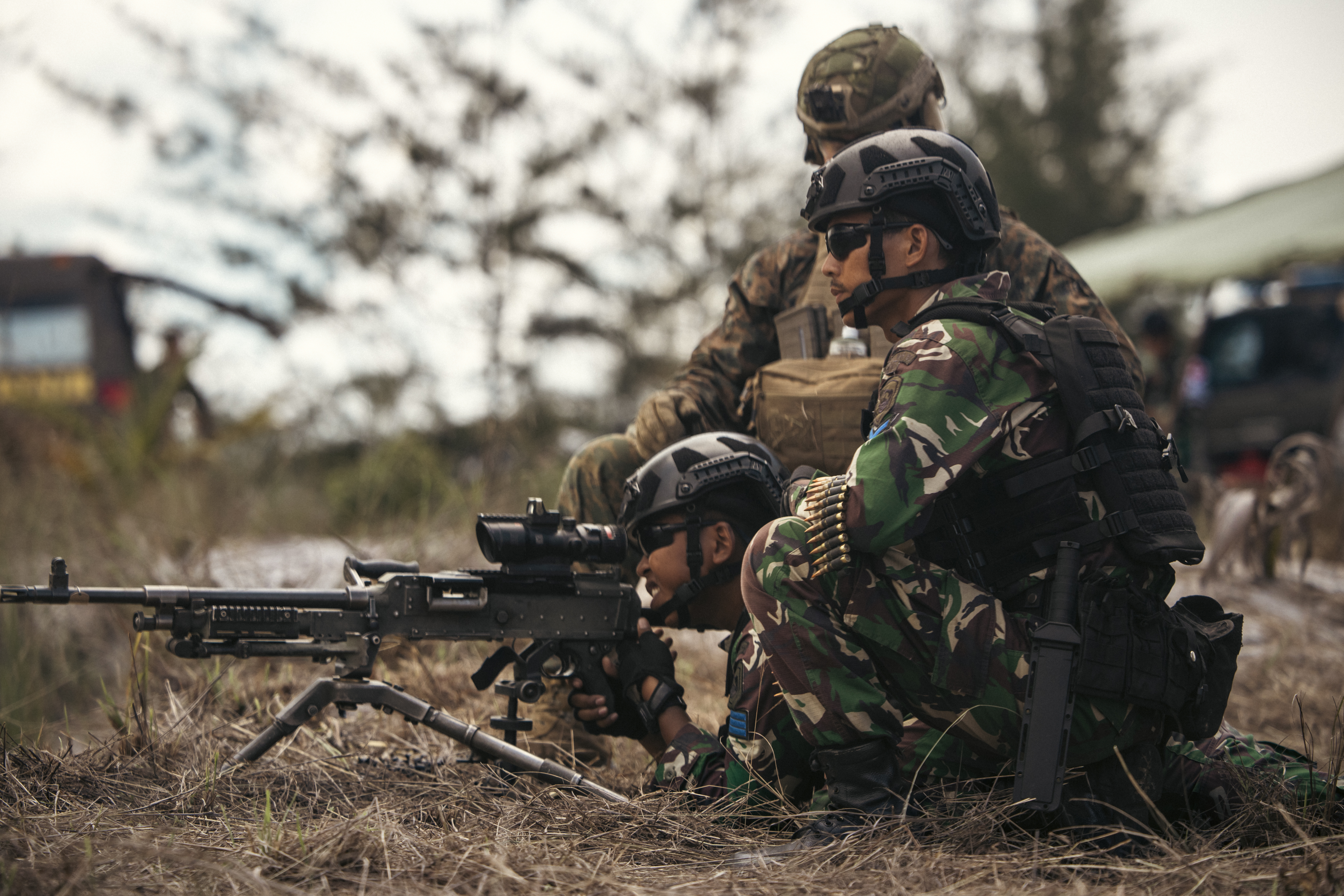
Indonesian marines with 10th Marine Infantry Battalion participate in a medium machine gun range during Keris Marine Exercise (MAREX) 2024 on Kabupaten Lingga, Singkep, Indonesia, 13 November 2024.

U.S. Marines with Marine Rotational Force–Southeast Asia (MRF-SEA) and elements of Korps Marinir Republik Indonesia (KORMAR) began the Keris Marine Exercise (Keris MAREX) 2024 with an Opening Ceremony led by the Commander of 4th Marine Infantry Brigade, Colonel Supriadi Tarigan as the Task Force Commander of Joint Exercise Keris MAREX 2024, accompanied by Colonel Stuart W. Glenn, Commanding Officer of 13th MEU, for Marine Rotational Force-Southeast Asia (MRF-SEA) on 6 November 2024, aboard 10th Marine Infantry Battalion (Yonif 10 Marinir) for 4th Marine Infantry Brigade (Brigif 4 Marinir), Setokok Island, Batam, Riau Islands. Attended by Commander of the Indonesian Marine Corps Maj. General Endi Supardi, with Commanding General of the I Marine Expeditionary Force Lt. General Michael S. Cederholm.

Keris MAREX 2024, taking place from 6 to 19 November 2024 marks the exercise’s third year in execution. During Keris MAREX 2024, approximately 200 U.S. Marines from MRF-SEA and 360 KORMAR personnel from the 10th Marine Infantry Battalion trained side by side, focusing on combined operational planning and coastal defense strategies and tactics.

The exercise contains marksmanship ranges, indirect fires with mortars, infantry tactics training, and small unmanned aircraft system utilization. Additionally, to increase the survivability of forces, Marines took part in jungle survival and medical CASEVAC training. The exercise culminated in a final mission, pitting the combined force of Indonesian and U.S. Marines against a notational enemy attempting to execute an amphibious landing. Utilizing tactics, techniques, and procedures refined during Keris MAREX, the Marines executed coastal defense operations and further solidify the interoperability of U.S. and Indonesian forces build during the exercise.

== See also ==
- RIMPAC
- Super Garuda Shield
- Keris Woomera
