= KRI Tanjung Kambani =

Ferry of the Indonesian Navy

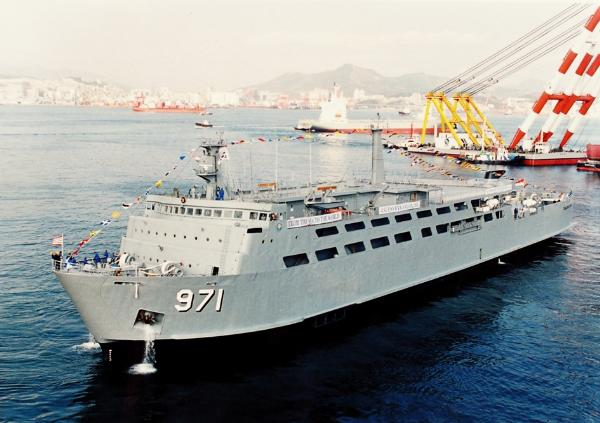
- KRI Tanjung Kambani

History

Indonesia
- Name: Tanjung Kambani
- Namesake: Cape Kambani, Peleng Island, Banggai Islands Regency
- Builder: Sanuki Shipbuilding, Kagawa
- Launched: March 1982 (as Kobe Maru)
- Acquired: 2000
- Commissioned: 10 November 2000
- Renamed: (Japan) Kobe Maru (1981-1991); (South Korea) Car Ferry Cheju No.2 (1991-1993）; (South Korea) Dong Yang Express Ferry No.6 (1993-2000）
- Identification: IMO number: 1234017; MMSI number: 525114070; Callsign: PLIL; Pennant number: 971
- Motto: Dharma Eka Bramantya; (Dharma, United, Spirited)
- Status: Active

General characteristics
- Type: Ro-ro ferry / Troopship
- Displacement: 7,138.9 tonnes (7,026.2 long tons; 7,869.3 short tons)
- Length: 375.65 ft (114 m)
- Beam: 6 m (20 ft)
- Speed: 13 knots (24 km/h; 15 mph)
- Endurance: 15 days
- Boats & landing craft carried: 2 × lifeboats
- Capacity: 20.83–23.6 tonnes (20.50–23.23 long tons; 22.96–26.01 short tons)
- Troops: 460-1500 personnel
- Complement: 119 crew
- Sensors & processing systems: 2 × I band radars
- Armament: 2 x 25 mm 2M-3 twin-barrel AA guns
- Aircraft carried: 1 × Eurocopter AS332 Super Puma
- Aviation facilities: Helipad

KRI Tanjung Kambani (971) is a troopship of the Indonesian Navy. She was built in 1982 as ro-ro ferry and previously named Kobe Maru, Car Ferry Cheju No.2 and Dong Yang Express Ferry No.6.

== Development and design ==
KRI Tanjung Kambani was an ordinary roll on/roll off ferry designed to carry passengers which was later modified into a personnel carrier and entered the ranks of the warships of the Republic of Indonesia.

KRI Tanjung Kambani has a length of 114.50 meters and a width of 19.80 meters and a depth of 6.00 meters. The personnel carrier ship with a dead weight of 7,138.9 tons has a maximum speed of 13 knots with the number of crew members according to the DSPP (List of Equipment and Personnel Arrangements) of 119 people. Meanwhile, the ideal carrying capacity of KRI Tanjung Kambani is with a bed capacity of 460 people, 6.8 tons helicopter, 20.83 tons cargo with an endurance of 15 days. Under certain conditions, Tanjung Kambani can carry 1500 people, 23.6 tons of cargo with endurance at the same time. While the vehicle space owned by KRI Tanjung Kambani can carry 38 units of REO M35 trucks, 45 light trucks, 65 HIACE types and 60 sedans. She can also carry an AS332 Super Puma helicopter. She is armed with two 25 mm 2M-3 twin-barrel anti-aircraft guns.

=== Namesake ===
The name KRI Tanjung Kambani itself is taken from the name of a cape on Peling Island, Central Sulawesi, precisely in Banggai Islands Regency, South Buko District. Cape Kambani was the gathering place for the Maritime Command Ships Task Force that carried troops during Operation Trikora in 1961.

== Construction and career ==
The ship was launched in March 1982 in Sanuki Shipbuilding, Japan.

At around 2:57 on 11 May 1986, the ship, which had left the 4th berth of the Higashi Kobe Ferry Center and was turning left in the front sea area to depart from Kobe Port toward Takamatsu Port, sailed in reverse. It collided with the tugboat Meifuku Maru. The bow of the Meifuku Maru collided slightly behind the center of the starboard side of the ship at an angle of about 30 degrees from the front, and the ship suffered a dent on the outer plate of the center of her starboard side and the frame was damaged. The Meifuku Maru was undamaged due to her bow fender. The cause of the accident was said to be the Doze operation of the Meifuku Maru, but it was also partly because the ship only radiated the other ship with a floodlight because it was midnight and did not give a warning signal.

In 1991, she was renamed Daiichi Kobe Maru and retired due to the service of Kobe Maru.

She was then sold overseas and entered service in South Korea as Car Ferry Cheju No.2. She was sold to Dong Yang Express Ferry in 1993 and she became Dong Yang Express Ferry No.6.

She was acquired by the Indonesian Navy in 2000, and was refurbished into a transport ship at Dae Sun Shipbuilding & Engineering in South Korea from May to November 2000. The vessel was commissioned on 10 November 2000 into the navy. She has been operated by Military Sealift Command (Kolinlamil) since 2000.

On 16 April 2021, KRI Tanjung Kambani from the Indonesian Navy's Second Fleet Command (Koarmada II) began distributing logistical assistance to disaster victims in dozens of regencies and cities in East Nusa Tenggara.

== Gallery ==
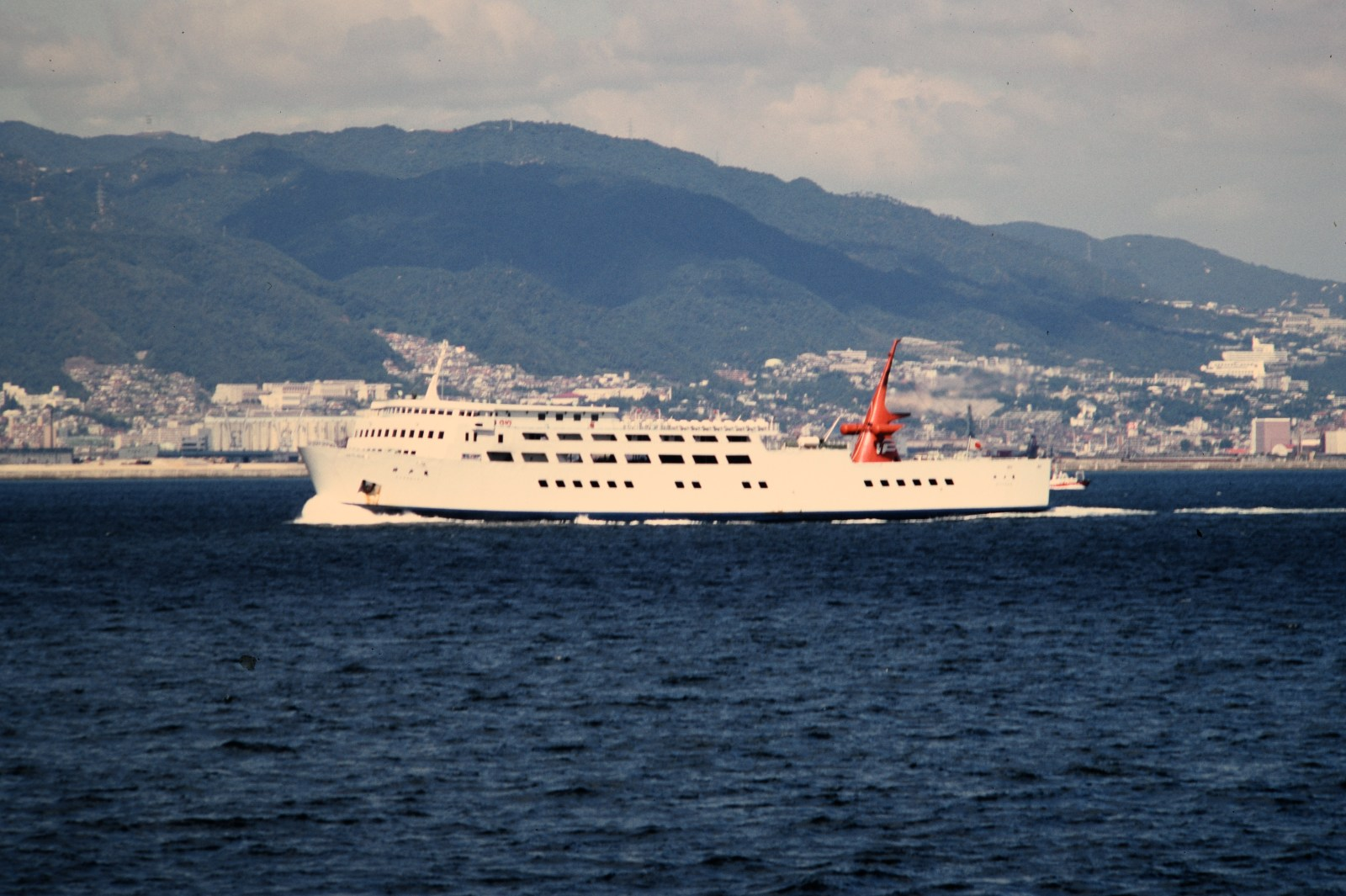
Kobe Maru on 8 October 1986

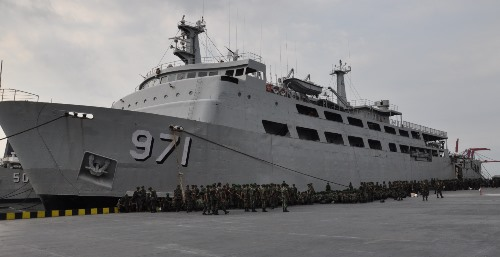
KRI Tanjung Kambani on 14 February 2017
