= KRI Diponegoro =

Two ships of the Indonesian Navy have been called KRI Diponegoro, named after the Prince Diponegoro of Hamengkubuwono, a Javanese prince who played important role in Java War, and a National Hero of Indonesia.

- KRI Diponegoro (306) was a Skoryy-class destroyer, formerly the Soviet destroyer Pylkiy. She was acquired in 1964 and stricken in 1973.
- KRI Diponegoro (365) is a lead ship of Diponegoro-class corvette launched in 2006 and commissioned in 2007.
