= Ketapang, South Lampung =

Ketapang
- District
- Interactive map of Ketapang
- Country: Indonesia
- Province: Lampung
- Regency: South Lampung Regency

Government

Area
  - Total: 18,660 km^{2} (7,200 sq mi)

Population
  - Total: 45,000
- Time zone: UTC+7 (West Indonesian Time)

Ketapang is a district in South Lampung Regency, Lampung, Indonesia. The district consists of 20 villages, and majority are of the Javanese ethnic.

== Village in Ketapang Sub-District ==
1. Ketapang
2. Legundi
3. Bangun Rejo
4. Tri Dharma Yoga
5. Sri Pendowo
6. Karang Sari
7. Sumber Nadi
8. Pematang Pasir
9. Ruguk
10. Gunung Taman
11. Sumur Induk
12. Yogaloka
13. Kramat Bakau
14. Berundung
15. Taman Sari
16. Lebung Nala
17. Kemukus
18. Sidoasih
19. Sidoluhur
20. Way Sidomukti
