= Soviet destroyer Bezzavetny =

Skory-class destroyer

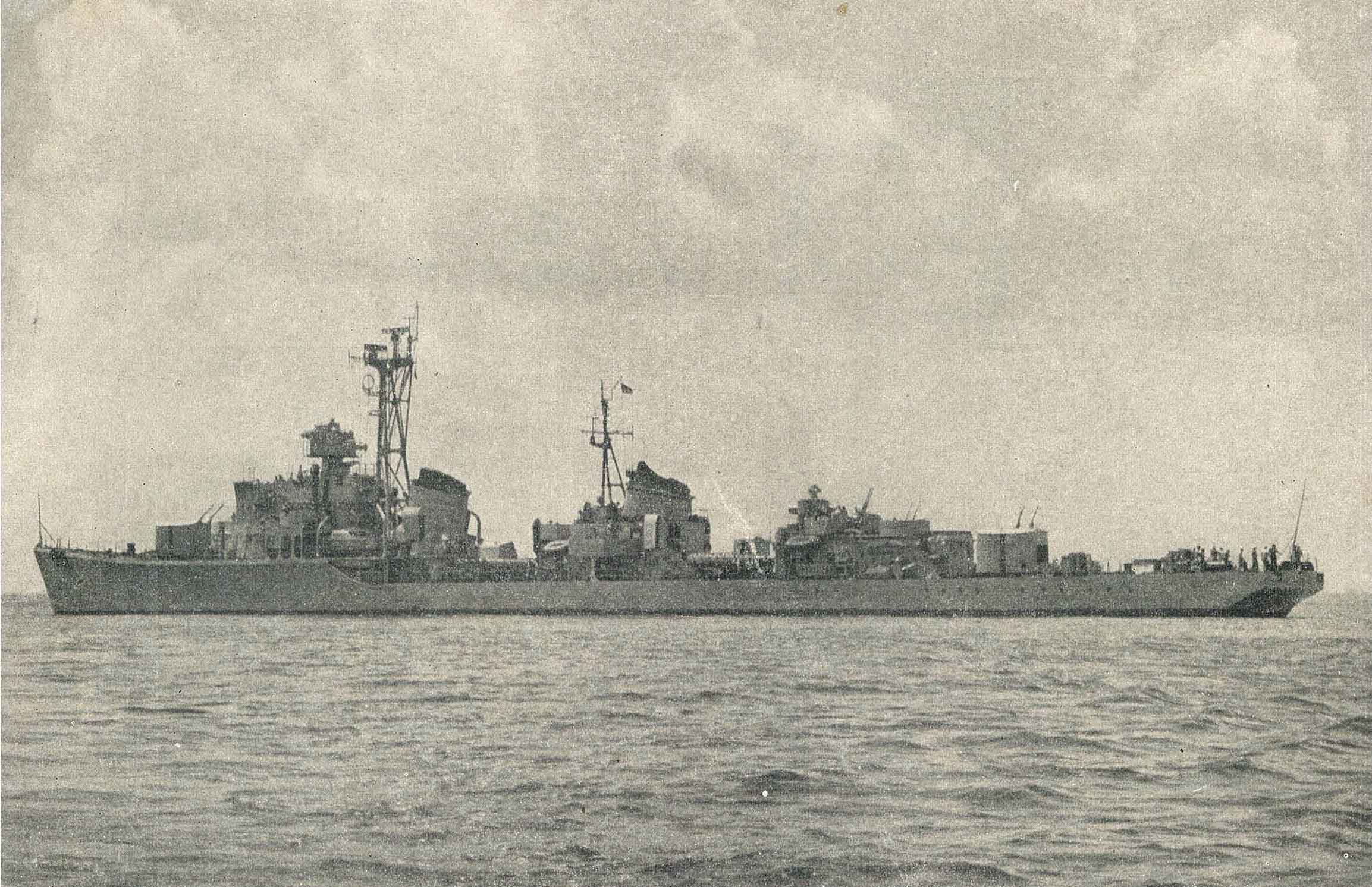
- A Skory-class destroyer of Indonesian Navy c. 1960s

History

Soviet Union
- Name: Bezzavetny; (Беззаветный)
- Namesake: Whole-hearted in Russian
- Builder: Mykolayiv Shipyard
- Laid down: 28 September 1950
- Launched: 30 March 1951
- Commissioned: 11 November 1951
- Decommissioned: 30 June 1959

Indonesia
- Name: Sultan Iskandar Muda
- Namesake: Sultan Iskandar Muda
- Commissioned: 1959
- Decommissioned: 1973
- Identification: Pennant number: 304

General characteristics
- Class & type: Skory-class destroyer
- Displacement: 2,316 long tons (2,353 t) standard; 3,066 long tons (3,115 t) full load
- Length: 120.5 m (395 ft 4 in)
- Beam: 12 m (39 ft 4 in)
- Draught: 3.9 m (12 ft 10 in)
- Propulsion: 3 × boilers 60,000 shp (44,742 kW); 2 × shafts
- Speed: 36.5 knots (67.6 km/h; 42.0 mph)
- Range: 4,080 nautical miles (7,556 km; 4,695 mi) at 16 kn (30 km/h; 18 mph)
- Complement: 286
- Sensors & processing systems: Radars: Gyus-1; Ryf-1; Redan-2; Vympel-2; Sonar: Tamir-5h
- Armament: as built: 2 × dual 130 mm (5.1 in) guns; 1 × dual 85 mm (3.3 in) guns; 7 × single 37 mm (1.5 in) guns; 2 × quin 533 mm (21 in) torpedo tubes; 60 × mines; 52 × depth charges; as modernized: 2 × dual 130 mm (5.1 in) guns; 2 × quin RBU 2500 anti-submarine rockets; 1 × dual 85 mm (3.3 in) guns; 7 × single 57 mm guns; 1 × quin 533 mm (21 in) torpedo tubes; 60 × mines or; 52 × depth charges

Bezzavetny was a Skory-class destroyer of the Soviet Navy which later transferred to the Indonesian Navy and renamed RI Sultan Iskandar Muda (304).

== Development ==
The development of the first post-war destroyer project based on the previous project 30 was entrusted to the TsKB-17 team. The composition of the armament was finally specified on November 28, 1945. The technical design materials and working drawings were developed under the leadership of the chief designer A. L. Fisher (deputies G. D. Agul, K. A. Maslennikov) in the new, recreated, TsKB-53. The technical design was approved by the Decree of the Council of Ministers of the USSR No. 149-95 of January 28, 1947.

The lead ship of this project was accepted into the USSR Navy on December 21, 1949, on the occasion of J.V. Stalin's birthday. Engineer-Lieutenant Colonel A.T.

== Construction and career ==
The ship was built at Mykolayiv Shipyard in Nikolaev and was launched on 30 March 1951 and commissioned into the Black Sea Fleet on 11 November 1951.

She was decommissioned on 30 June 1959 and sold to the Indonesian Navy. She was renamed RI Sultan Iskandar Muda (304).

She was again retired from service in 1973.
