= Commanding General, United States Army Pacific =

Senior appointment in the United States Army

Commanding General of United States Army Pacific
- Shoulder sleeve insignia of USARPAC

- Flag of a U.S. Army four-star general

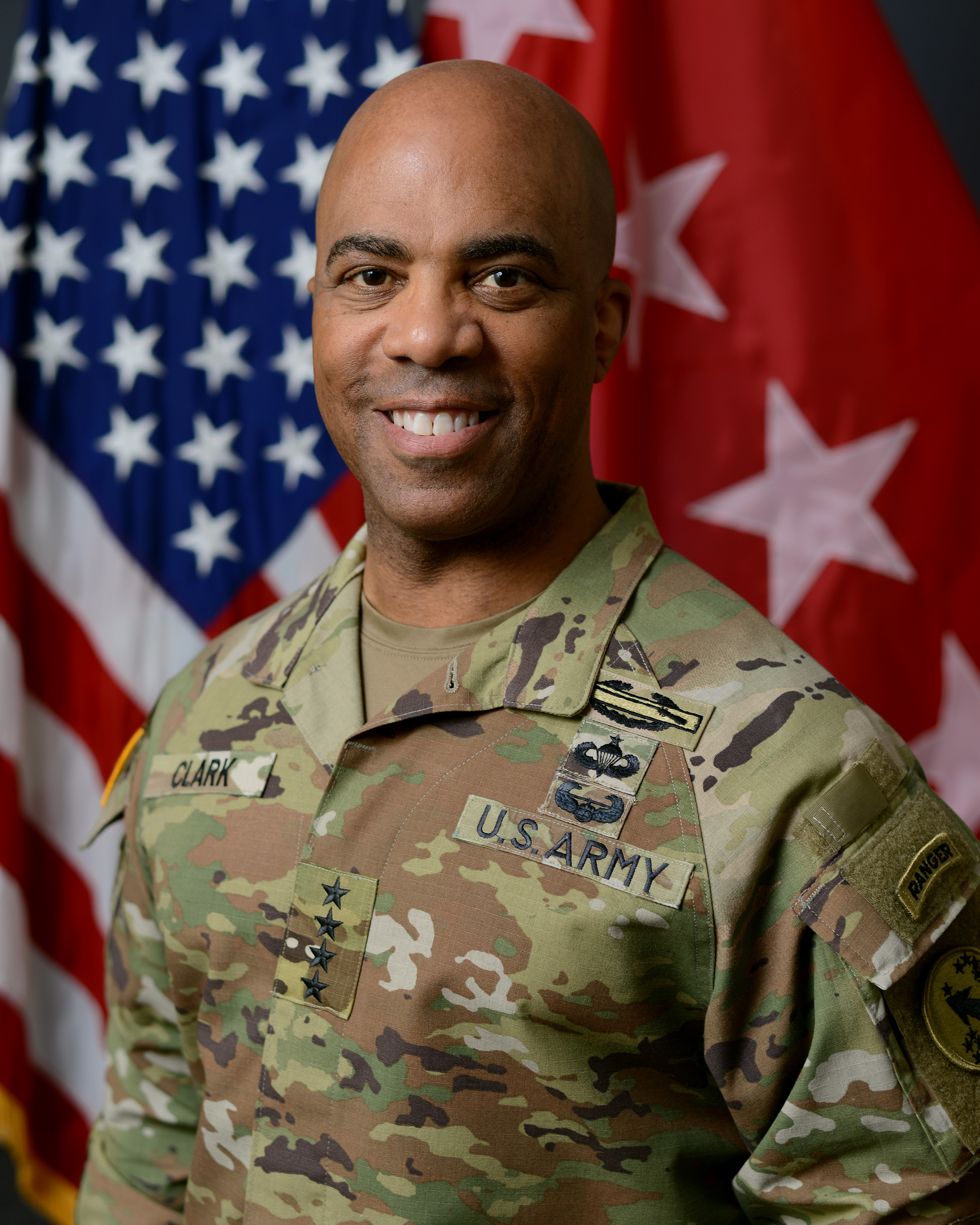
- Incumbent; General Ronald P. Clark since November 8, 2024
- United States Army Pacific
- Type: Service component commander
- Abbreviation: CG USARPAC; CG, USARPAC
- Reports to: Commander, United States Indo-Pacific Command (operational); Secretary of the Army (administrative); Chief of Staff of the United States Army (administrative)
- Seat: Fort Shafter, Hawaii
- Appointer: The president with Senate advice and consent
- Term length: 2–3 years (approx.)
- Formation: 1910 (as Commander, Military District of Hawaii); 1990 (as Commanding General, U.S Army Pacific)
- First holder: Walter S. Schuyler (as Commander, Military District of Hawaii); Claude M. Kicklighter (as Commanding General, U.S. Army Pacific)
- Deputy: Deputy Commanding General, U.S. Army Pacific (Principal Deputy); Deputy Commanding General (South), U.S. Army Pacific (Australian Army Deputy); Deputy Commanding General, Army National Guard, U.S. Army Pacific (ARNG Deputy)
- Website: Official website

The commanding general of United States Army Pacific (CG USARPAC or CG, USARPAC) is the commander of United States Army Pacific, the army service component command of United States Indo-Pacific Command (USINDOPACOM). As CG USARPAC, the officeholder is responsible for United States Army forces stationed within INDOPACOM's area of operations, including Hawaii, South Korea, Japan and Alaska.

The current commanding general is General Ronald P. Clark.

== Rank ==
When the modern iteration of USARPAC was created, the holder of the position was a three-star lieutenant general. In July 2013, USARPAC transitioned into a four-star command with the confirmation of Vincent K. Brooks to the position "to broaden political-military aims through increased shaping activities and building partner capacity in the USARPAC area of responsibility".

== List of commanders ==
=== Commander, District of Hawaii ===
No.	Commander		Term		
No.	Portrait	Name	Took office	Left office	Term length
1	Walter S. Schuyler	Colonel; Walter S. Schuyler (1850–1932)	1909	1910	~1 year
2	Homer W. Wheeler	Lieutenant Colonel; Homer W. Wheeler (1848–1930)	1910	1911	~1 year
3	Montgomery M. Macomb	Brigadier General; Montgomery M. Macomb (1852–1924)	October 1, 1911	1911	~1 year

=== Commander, Department of Hawaii ===
No.	Commander		Term		
No.	Portrait	Name	Took office	Left office	Term length
1	Montgomery M. Macomb	Brigadier General; Montgomery M. Macomb (1852–1924)	1911	1912	~1 year
2	George K. McGunnegle	Colonel; George K. McGunnegle (1854–1938)	December 5, 1912	February 14, 1913	71 days

=== Commander, Hawaiian Department ===
No.	Commander		Term		
No.	Portrait	Name	Took office	Left office	Term length
1	Montgomery M. Macomb	Brigadier General; Montgomery M. Macomb (1852–1924)	1913	1913	~1 year
2	Frederick Funston	Brigadier General; Frederick Funston (1865–1917)	1913	1914	~1 year
3	Montgomery M. Macomb	Brigadier General; Montgomery M. Macomb (1852–1924)	January 23, 1914	March 12, 1914	48 days
4	William Harding Carter	Major General; William Harding Carter (1851–1925)	March 12, 1914	November 19, 1915	1 year, 252 days
5	John Philip Wisser	Brigadier General; John Philip Wisser (1852–1927)	1915	1916	~1 year
6	Robert K. Evans	Brigadier General; Robert K. Evans (1852–1926)	1916	1916	~1 year
7	Frederick S. Strong	Brigadier General; Frederick S. Strong (1855–1935)	1916	1917	~1 year
8	Charles G. Treat	Brigadier General; Charles G. Treat (1859–1941)	1917	1917	~1 year
9	John Philip Wisser	Brigadier General; John Philip Wisser (1852–1927)	1917	1917	~1 year
10	Augustus P. Blocksom	Brigadier General; Augustus P. Blocksom (1854–1931)	1918	November 17, 1918	~1 year
11	John W. Heard	Brigadier General; John W. Heard (1860–1922)	1918	1919	~1 year
12	Henry Clay Hodges Jr.	Major General; Henry Clay Hodges Jr. (1860–1963)	March 1919	May 1919	~61 days
13	Thomas Ridgway	Colonel; Thomas Ridgway (1861–1939)	1919	1919	~1 month
14	Charles Gould Morton	Major General; Charles Gould Morton (1861–1933)	1919	1921	~2 years
15	Charles P. Summerall	Major General; Charles P. Summerall (1867–1955)	1921	1924	~3 years
16	Charles T. Menoher	Major General; Charles T. Menoher (1862–1930)	1924	1925	~1 year
17	Edward Mann Lewis	Major General; Edward Mann Lewis (1863–1949)	January 1925	August 1927	~2 years, 212 days
18	William Ruthven Smith	Major General; William Ruthven Smith (1868–1941)	August 1927	January 1928	~153 days
18	Fox Conner	Major General; Fox Conner (1874–1951)	January 1928	October 1930	~2 years, 273 days
–	Edwin B. Winans	Major General; Edwin B. Winans (1869–1947); Acting	1930	1930	~1 year
19	William Lassiter	Major General; William Lassiter (1867–1959)	1930	1931	~1 year
20	Briant H. Wells	Major General; Briant H. Wells (1871–1949)	1931	1934	~1 year
–	Halstead Dorey	Major General; Halstead Dorey (1874–1946); Acting	1934	1935	~1 year
21	Hugh Aloysius Drum	Major General; Hugh Aloysius Drum (1879–1951)	1935	1937	~2 years
22	Andrew Moses	Major General; Andrew Moses (1874–1946)	1937	June 30, 1938	~1 year, 180 days
23	Charles D. Herron	Lieutenant General; Charles D. Herron (1877–1977)	1938	March 1941	~3 years
24	Walter Short	Lieutenant General; Walter Short (1880–1949)	February 8, 1941	December 17, 1941	312 days
25	Delos Carleton Emmons	Lieutenant General; Delos Carleton Emmons (1889–1965)	December 17, 1941	September 1943	~1 year, 258 days
26	Robert C. Richardson Jr.	Lieutenant General; Robert C. Richardson Jr. (1882–1954)	1943	1945	~2 years

=== Commanding General, United States Army Pacific ===
No.	Commanding General		Term		
No.	Portrait	Name	Took office	Left office	Term length
Commander, United States Army Forces, Middle Pacific
1	Robert C. Richardson Jr.	Lieutenant General; Robert C. Richardson Jr. (1882–1954)	1945	1946	~1 year
2	George F. Moore	Major General; George F. Moore (1887–1949)	1946	1946	~1 year
3	John E. Hull	Lieutenant General; John E. Hull (1895–1975)	1946	1947	~1 year
Commanding General, United States Army, Pacific
3	John E. Hull	Lieutenant General; John E. Hull (1895–1975)	1947	1949	~2 years
4	Floyd Lavinius Parks	Major General; Floyd Lavinius Parks (1896–1959)	1949	1949	~2 years
5	Henry S. Aurand	Lieutenant General; Henry S. Aurand (1894–1980)	March 21, 1949	August 31, 1952	3 years, 163 days
6	John W. O'Daniel	Lieutenant General; John W. O'Daniel (1894–1975)	September 1952	April 1954	~1 year, 212 days
7	Clark L. Ruffner	Major General; Clark L. Ruffner (1903–1982)	1954	1954	~1 years
8	Bruce C. Clarke	Lieutenant General; Bruce C. Clarke (1901–1988)	December 1954	April 1956	~1 year, 122 days
9	Herbert B. Powell	Major General; Herbert B. Powell (1903–1998)	April 1956	July 1956	~91 days
10	Blackshear M. Bryan	Lieutenant General; Blackshear M. Bryan (1900–1977)	July 1956	July 1957	~1 year, 0 days
Commander-in-Chief, United States Army, Pacific
11	Isaac D. White	General; Isaac D. White (1901–1990)	July 1957	March 1961	~3 years, 243 days
12	James Francis Collins	General; James Francis Collins (1905–1989)	April 1961	March 1964	~2 years, 335 days
13	John K. Waters	General; John K. Waters (1906–1989)	March 1964	September 1966	~2 years, 184 days
14	Dwight E. Beach	General; Dwight E. Beach (1908–2000)	September 1966	July 1968	~1 year, 335 days
15	Ralph E. Haines Jr.	General; Ralph E. Haines Jr. (1913–2011)	August 1968	October 1970	~2 years, 61 days
16	William B. Rosson	General; William B. Rosson (1918–2004)	October 1970	January 1973	~2 years, 92 days
–	Donald V. Bennett	General; Donald V. Bennett (1915–2005); Acting	1973	1973	~1 year
17	Frederick C. Weyand	General; Frederick C. Weyand (1916–2010)	1973	1973	~1 year
18	Donald V. Bennett	General; Donald V. Bennett (1915–2005)	August 1973	August 1974	~1 year, 0 days
–	Richard G. Stilwell	General; Richard G. Stilwell (1917–1991); Acting	September 1974	December 31, 1974	~1 year
Commander, United States Army CINCPAC Support Group
19	Donnelly P. Bolton	Major General; Donnelly P. Bolton (1919–2000)	January 1, 1975	August 27, 1975	~1 year
20	Thomas U. Greer	Major General; Thomas U. Greer (1928–2014)	August 28, 1975	1977	~2 years
21	Herbert E. Wolff	Major General; Herbert E. Wolff (1925–2009)	December 1977	March 1979	~2 years
Commanding General, United States Army Western Command
21	Herbert E. Wolff	Major General; Herbert E. Wolff (1925–2009)	March 1979	1981	~2 years
22	Eugene P. Forrester	Lieutenant General; Eugene P. Forrester (1926–2012)	1981	1983	~2 years
23	James Madison Lee	Lieutenant General; James Madison Lee (1926–2017)	1983	1985	~2 years
24	Charles W. Bagnal	Lieutenant General; Charles W. Bagnal (1933–2015)	June 1985	July 1989	~4 years, 30 days
25	Claude M. Kicklighter	Lieutenant General; Claude M. Kicklighter (born 1933)	July 1989	1990	~184 days
Commanding General, United States Army Pacific
25	Claude M. Kicklighter	Lieutenant General; Claude M. Kicklighter (born 1933)	1990	July 1991	~1 year, 181 days
26	Johnnie H. Corns	Lieutenant General; Johnnie H. Corns (1936–2020)	July 1991	September 1993	~2 years, 62 days
27	Robert L. Ord III	Lieutenant General; Robert L. Ord III (born 1940)	November 1993	May 1996	~2 years, 182 days
–	Stephen Silvasy Jr.	Major General; Stephen Silvasy Jr. (born 1941); Acting	May 1996	July 24, 1996	~92 days
28	William M. Steele	Lieutenant General; William M. Steele	July 25, 1996	October 19, 1998	2 years, 86 days
29	Edwin P. Smith	Lieutenant General; Edwin P. Smith (born 1945)	October 20, 1998	November 4, 2002	4 years, 15 days
30	James L. Campbell	Lieutenant General; James L. Campbell (born 1949)	November 5, 2002	August 4, 2004	1 year, 273 days
31	John M. Brown III	Lieutenant General; John M. Brown III	August 4, 2004	February 1, 2008	3 years, 181 days
32	Benjamin R. Mixon	Lieutenant General; Benjamin R. Mixon (born 1953)	February 1, 2008	March 21, 2011	3 years, 48 days
33	Francis J. Wiercinski	Lieutenant General; Francis J. Wiercinski (born 1956)	March 21, 2011	July 2, 2013	2 years, 103 days
34	Vincent K. Brooks	General; Vincent K. Brooks (Note: First commander of the current iteration of USARPAC to be a four-star general.) (born 1958)	July 2, 2013	April 30, 2016	2 years, 303 days
35	Robert B. Brown	General; Robert B. Brown (born 1956)	April 30, 2016	October 8, 2019	3 years, 161 days
–	John P. Johnson	Major General; John P. Johnson; Acting	October 8, 2019	November 18, 2019	41 days
36	Paul J. LaCamera	General; Paul J. LaCamera (born 1963)	November 18, 2019	June 4, 2021	1 year, 198 days
37	Charles A. Flynn	General; Charles A. Flynn (born 1963)	June 4, 2021	November 8, 2024	3 years, 157 days
38	Ronald P. Clark	General; Ronald P. Clark (born 1966)	November 8, 2024	Incumbent	1 year, 303 days

== See also ==
- United States Army Pacific
- Commanding General, United States Army Europe and Africa
- List of active duty United States four-star officers
