= General Wolf =

General Wolf, Wolff, or Wolfe may refer to:

- Adolf Wolf (1899–1973), German Luftwaffe major general
- Edward Wolfe (1685–1759), British Army lieutenant general
- Herbert E. Wolff (1925–2009), U.S. Army major general
- James Wolfe (1727–1759), British Army major general
- Karl Wolff (1900–1984), German SS general
- Ludwig Wolff (general) (1893–1968), German Wehrmacht general
- Ludwig Wolff (general, born 1886) (1886–1950), German Luftwaffe general

== See also ==
- Little Wolf (c. 1820—1904), Northern Só'taeo'o Chief
- Hermann Wulf (1915–1990), German Bundeswehr brigadier general
- Rudolf Wulf (1905–1972), German Wehrmacht major general
