= Thomas Ridgway (colonel) =

U.S. Army officer (1861–1939)

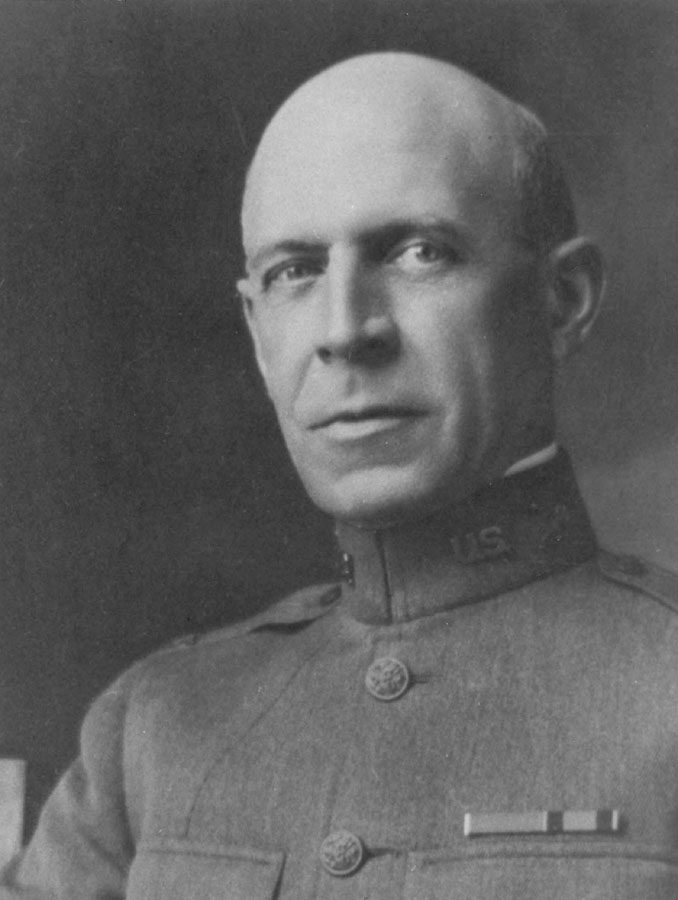
- Ridgway as colonel commanding the Coast Defenses of Oahu in 1919.
- Born: August 18, 1861; Brooklyn, New York, U.S.
- Died: May 5, 1939 (aged 77); San Diego, California, U.S.
- Burial place: Fort Rosecrans National Cemetery
- Spouse: Ruth Starbuck. Bunker (m. 1890–1939, his death)
- Children: 2 (including Matthew Ridgway)
- Military career
- Allegiance: United States
- Branch: United States Army
- Service years: 1883–1919
- Rank: Colonel
- Unit: Coast Artillery Corps
- Commands: Battery N, 5th Artillery Regiment; Light Battery F, 5th Artillery Regiment; Coast Defenses of Pensacola; Coast Defenses of Boston; South Atlantic Coast Artillery District; Coast Defenses of Portland, Maine; Coast Defenses of Oahu; Hawaiian Department
- Conflicts: Spanish–American War; Philippine–American War; Boxer Rebellion; World War I

Thomas Ridgway (August 18, 1861 – May 5, 1939) was a career officer in the United States Army. A Coast Artillery specialist, Ridgway served from 1883 to 1919 and attained the rank of colonel. A veteran of the Spanish–American War, Philippine–American War, Boxer Rebellion, and World War I, he was most notable for his service as commander of several Coast Artillery posts and districts and acting commander of the Hawaiian Department. Ridgway was the father of General Matthew Ridgway.

== Early life ==
Thomas Ridgway was born in Brooklyn, New York on August 18, 1861, the son of attorney James Ridgway and Esther Lucas Molière Ridgway. He attended the public schools of Brooklyn, and was a student at New York University for two years as a member of the class of 1881. While at NYU, Ridgway became a member of the Delta Phi fraternity. In 1879, Ridgway was appointed to the United States Military Academy by U.S. Representative Simeon B. Chittenden. He graduated in 1883 ranked 10th of 52, and received his commission as a second lieutenant in the Artillery branch.

== Start of career ==
Ridgway became a specialist in the use of coastal artillery for harbor defenses, a major strategic concern for the United States government in the late 1800s and early 1900s as the expansion of several nations' navies detracted from the natural defenses America enjoyed because of its location between the Atlantic and Pacific Oceans. Initially assigned to the 5th Artillery Regiment, Ridgway's early assignments included postings to New York's Fort Wadsworth, Fort Hamilton, and Riverside Park. From May 1886 to October 1887, Ridgway was assigned as professor of military science at St. Paul's School in Garden City.

From December 1887 to July 1888, Ridgway attended the Torpedo School at Fort Totten. (Note: Torpedoes were underwater mines used in harbor defense.) After graduating, Ridgway returned to duty at Fort Hamilton, where he remained until May 1890. He was assigned to the Presidio of San Francisco from May 1890 to June 1891 and Fort Alcatraz from June 1891 to August 1892. Ridgway was promoted to first lieutenant in February 1891. From 1892 to 1896, he was assigned to the staff of the artillery school at Fort Monroe, Virginia. He graduated from the Fort Monroe artillery officer's course in September 1896. Ridgway served with a light artillery battery at Fort Riley, Kansas from December 1896 to March 1898, when he was transferred to the 6th Artillery.

== Spanish–American War ==
At the start of the Spanish–American War, Ridgway was assigned to assist in the rapid improvement of coastal defenses in the eastern United States. These postings included Tybee Island, Georgia (March 1898), Fort McHenry, Maryland (March to April 1898), Fort Hamilton (April 1898), and Washington Barracks, D.C. (April 1898). He was transferred back to the 5th Artillery in late April 1898.

After returning to the 5th Artillery, Ridgway served at Fort Myer, Virginia (May 1898), Fort Hamilton (May 1898), Fort Hancock, New Jersey (May to July 1898), Fort Hamilton, (July 1898), and Fort Wadsworth (May to December 1898). After the war, Ridgway was assigned to Fort Hamilton from December 1898 to January 1900. He was promoted to captain in the 5th Artillery in March 1899, and he served as regimental adjutant from May 1899 to January 1900.

== Post-war ==
From January to August 1900, Ridgway commanded Battery N, 5th Artillery at Fort Monroe. He was then transferred to Light Battery F, 5th Artillery, which he commanded when it served in the Philippines during the Philippine–American War and in China during the U.S. response to the Boxer Rebellion. He returned to the United States in June 1901, and commanded his battery at Fort Walla Walla, Washington from July 1901 to October 1902 and Fort Snelling, Minnesota from October 1902 to August 1906. He was promoted to major in June 1906.

Ridgway performed staff duty at Fort Caswell, North Carolina, from August 1906 to June 1907 and Fort Monroe from June 1907 to November 1909. When the army created the Coast Artillery Corps as a separate branch in 1907, Ridgway was assigned to the Coast Artillery. He was posted to Fort Andrews, Massachusetts from November 1909 to September 1912. Ridgway was promoted to lieutenant colonel in July 1910 and colonel in September 1912.

== Later career ==
After becoming a colonel, Ridgway was assigned to Fort Barrancas, Florida as commander of the Coast Defenses of Pensacola. He commanded the Coast Defenses of Boston beginning in November 1915, and remained in this position during the early stages of U.S. involvement in World War I. He commanded the South Atlantic Coast Artillery District in Charleston, South Carolina from March 17 to August 1918, after which he was assigned to command the Coast Defenses of Portland, Maine. He continued in this post through the end of the war.

In February 1919, Ridgway was assigned to command the Coast Defenses of Oahu, where he remained until retiring in October 1919. From June to July 1919, he also served as acting commander of the army's Hawaiian Department. Ridgway was visiting a laboratory in January 1912 when an explosion occurred, which resulted in him losing sight in one eye. In September 1919, he requested retirement for the disability that resulted from this injury, which was approved in October 1919.

== Retirement and death ==
In retirement, Ridgway was a resident of San Diego, California. He died in San Diego on May 5, 1939. He was buried at Fort Rosecrans National Cemetery in San Diego.

== Family ==
In February 1890, Ridgway married Ruth Starbuck Bunker (1870–1956). They were the parents of two children, Matthew and Ruth. Matthew Ridgway was a career army officer who attained the rank of general and served as Chief of Staff of the United States Army.
