= 1st Infantry Regiment (United States) =

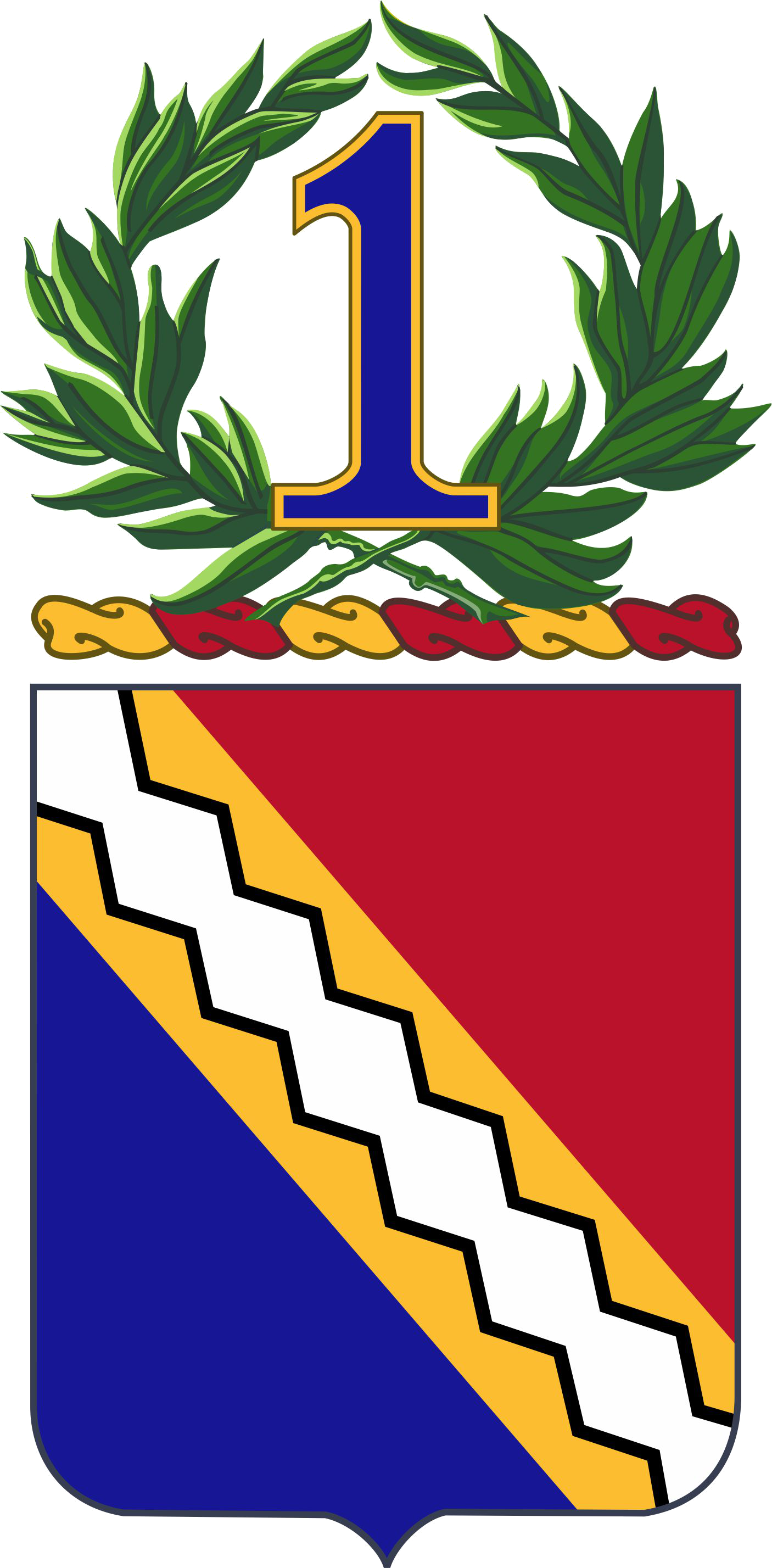
- Coat of arms of the 1st Infantry Regiment
- Active: 1791–1949; 1950–present
- Allegiance: United States
- Branch: United States Army
- Type: Infantry
- Role: Light/mechanized infantry
- Size: Regiment
- Garrison/HQ: 1st Bn – West Point, NY; 2nd Bn – Joint Base Lewis–McChord, WA
- Motto: Semper Primus ("Always First")
- Engagements: Northwest Indian War; War of 1812; Mexican–American War; Civil War; Spanish–American War; Siege of Santiago; Philippine–American War; World War II; Vietnam War; Iraq War; War in Afghanistan (2001–2021)
- Decorations: Presidential Unit Citation; Valorous Unit Award; Philippine Presidential Unit Citation

Commanders
- Current commander: 1st Bn – LTC Thomas M. Bischof; 2nd Bn – LTC John "Rocky" Rhodes
- Notable commanders: Josiah Harmar; Arthur St. Clair; James Wilkinson; Zachary Taylor; Robert C. Buchanan; Henry C. Hodges Jr. William Weigel; Benjamin A. Poore; John L. DeWitt; John F. Preston; John H. Hester

Insignia
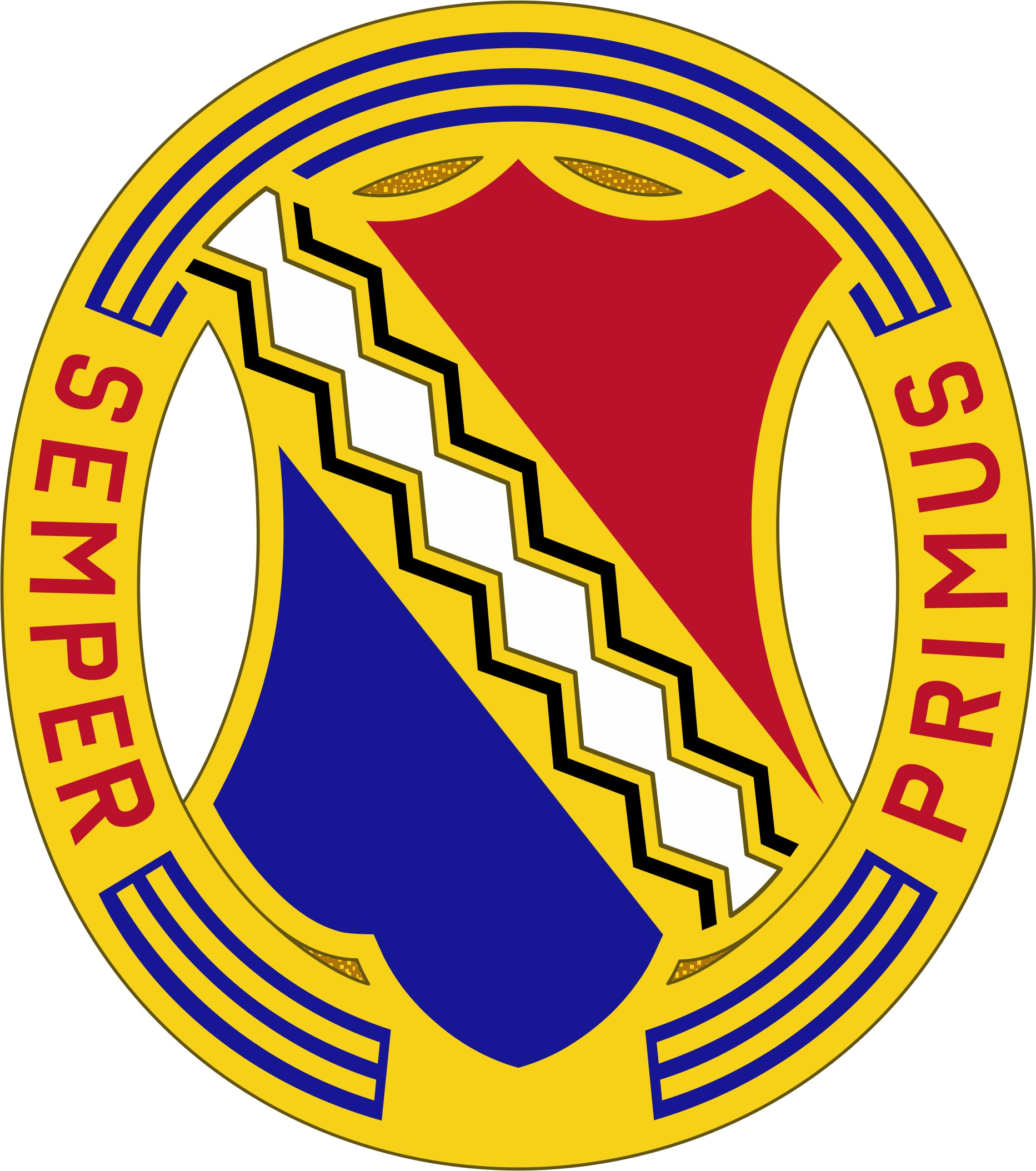
- Distinctive unit insignia

The 1st Infantry Regiment is a regiment of the United States Army that draws its lineage from a line of post American Revolutionary War units and is decorated with thirty-nine campaign streamers. The 1st Battalion, 1st Infantry is assigned as support to the United States Military Academy at West Point, New York and to furnish the enlisted garrison for the academy and the Stewart Army Subpost. 2nd Battalion, 1st Infantry Regiment is an infantry component serving with the 2nd Stryker Brigade, 2nd Infantry Division at Joint Base Lewis–McChord, Washington.

== History ==
=== Origins ===
On 3 March 1791, Congress added to the Army "The Second Regiment of Infantry" from which today's First Infantry draws its heritage. In September of that year, elements of it and the original 1st Infantry Regiment (today's 3rd United States Infantry Regiment (The Old Guard)), with sizable militia complements, all under the command of General Arthur St. Clair, were sent to the Northwest Indian War of the Ohio country. St. Clair served as a major general in the Continental Army and was now appointed "General in Chief," superseding the first commander of the regiment, Josiah Harmar. Fighting against the Miamis, St. Clair's soldiers were untrained, ill-equipped, underfed, and sickly. This resulted in a disastrous defeat in which the entire U.S. Army suffered a loss of about 700 killed and some 300 wounded out of a total strength of around 1,700, with some 100 civilians killed and 50 wounded as well.

=== Early history ===
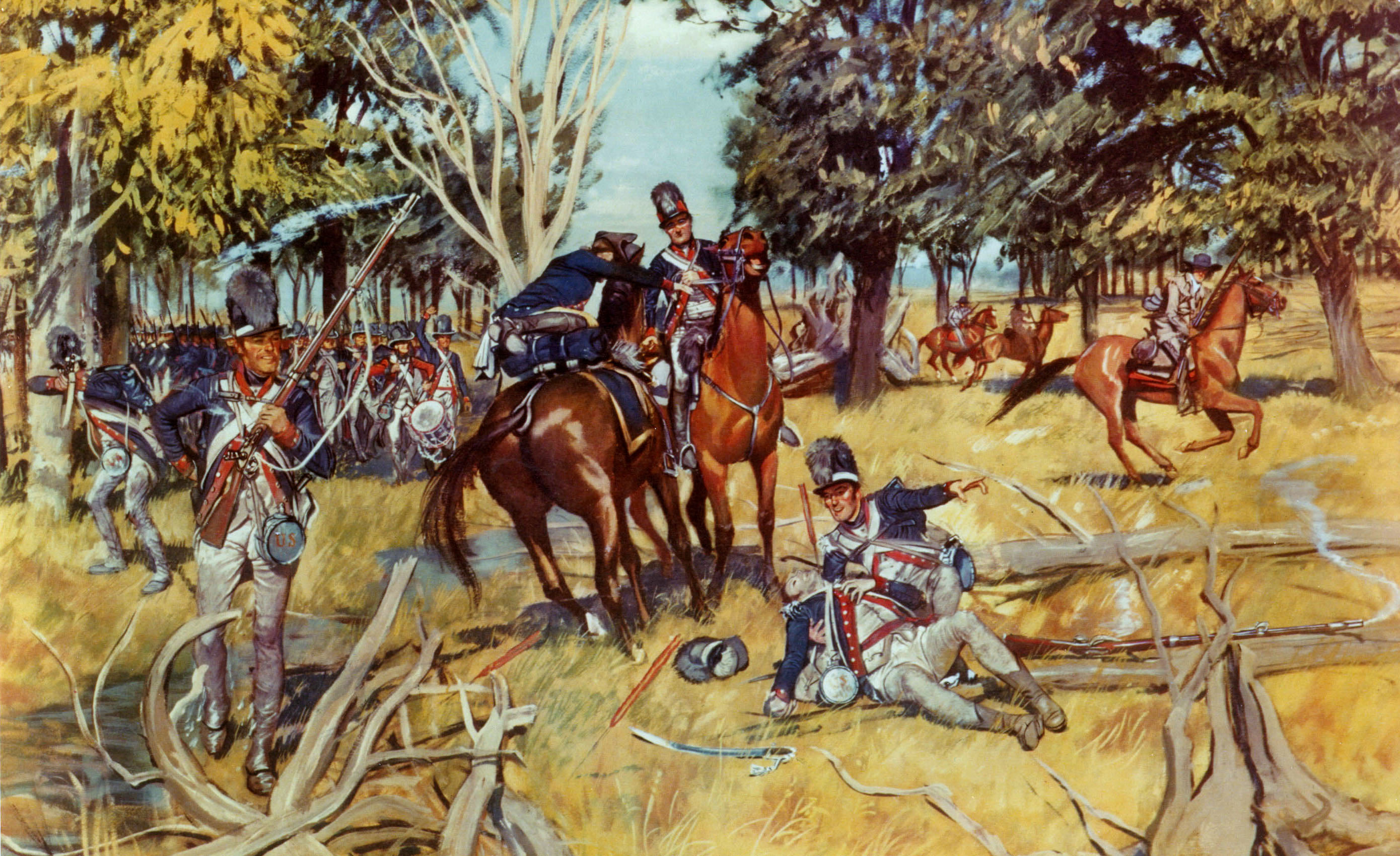
Banks of the Maumee. Anthony Wayne commanded the Army, enlarged in 1792 and was formed into the Legion (now 1st and 3rd Infantry Regiments). The Legion advanced into Indian country and on 20 August 1794 routed Indian forces.

In 1792, Congress reorganized the United States Army into the Legion of the United States, a single formation of infantry, cavalry and artillery units under the command of Major-General Anthony Wayne. The 2nd Infantry Regiment was redesignated as the 2nd Sub-Legion, and participated in the decisive victory over the Northwestern Confederacy at the battle of Fallen Timbers on 20 August 1794. In 1796, the Legion of the United States was organized back into the United States Army, and the 2nd Sub-Legion reverted to being the 2nd Infantry Regiment. During the War of 1812, the 2nd Infantry Regiment as well as the 7th and 44th Infantry Regiments, fought in the Battle of New Orleans under General Andrew Jackson. This gives the regiment campaign credit for the War of 1812.

=== First Indian War period ===
The 2nd Infantry was consolidated May–October 1815 with the 3rd and 7th Infantry (both constituted 12 April 1808), and 44th Infantry (constituted 29 January 1813) to form the 1st Infantry Regiment. In the ensuing years the regiment was primarily concerned with Indian conflicts and the 1st was involved in the Black Hawk War of 1832 and the Second Seminole War from 1839 to 1842. During this time the regiment was commanded by many, now famous commanders including, Colonel Zachary Taylor, who would later become the 12th President of the United States and Second Lieutenant Jefferson Davis, who would become the President of the Confederate States in the American Civil War.

=== War with Mexico ===
When War broke out with Mexico in 1846, the 1st Infantry Regiment was sent across the border with General Zachary Taylor's Army and participated in the storming of Monterrey where the regiment fought house to house in savage hand-to-hand combat. From Monterrey, the regiment was transferred to General Winfield Scott's command and participated in the first modern amphibious landing in American history at Vera Cruz in 1847.

=== Second Indian War period ===
Following the Mexican–American War, the regiment campaigned in the Texas area against the Comanches until the outbreak of the Civil War in 1861.

=== Civil War ===
After escaping from rebel forces in Texas the regiment returned to the Mid-west and fought in the Mississippi area of operations. The regiment fought in one of the first battles of the Civil War at Wilson's Creek, Missouri, in August 1861. The 1st Infantry then campaigned with General Grant against Vicksburg in 1863. The end of the war found the regiment occupying New Orleans, Louisiana.

=== Third Indian War period ===
After the Civil War the regiment was sent West to fight the Indians once again. The 1st Infantry was consolidated in April 1869 with the 43d Infantry Regiment, Veteran Reserve Corps (constituted 21 September 1865) and consolidated unit designated as the 1st Infantry Regiment. 1st Infantry Regiment campaigned against the Sioux in the 1870s and 1890s and against the Apache, led by Geronimo, from 1882 to 1886.

One member of the regiment was awarded the Medal of Honor for service during this period: 1st Lt. Marion P. Maus, 11 January 1886, Sierra Madre Mountains, Mexico.

After the end of the Indian wars the regiment was occupied with quelling labor disputes in California.

=== Spanish–American War ===
War was declared with Spain in 1898 following the sinking of the USS Maine. The First was quickly sent to Florida where it embarked on ships and was sent to Cuba. While in Cuba the regiment took part in the storming of the San Juan Heights and the capture of Santiago.

=== Philippine–American War ===
In 1900, following occupation duty in Cuba, the regiment was preparing for shipment to China to participate in the Boxer Rebellion. Instead, the regiment was detoured to deal with the rebellion on the Philippine Islands which had also been captured by the United States in the Spanish–American War. The regiment would fight in this guerrilla war in the Philippines from 1900 to 1902 and again from 1906 to 1908.

Subsequently, the regiment was redeployed to garrison duties in Oahu, Hawaii and commanded by Colonel George K. McGunnegle.

=== World War I ===
The 1st Infantry Regiment was assigned on 11 September 1918 to the 13th Division at Camp Lewis. However, the 13th Division never left Camp Lewis, and was demobilized there on 8 March 1919 after the Armistice of 11 November 1918; the 1st Infantry Regiment was concurrently relieved from assignment to the 13th Division and resumed its status as a separate regiment.

=== Interwar period ===
The regiment was transferred on 27 July 1921 to Fort Sam Houston, Texas, and assigned to the newly organized 4th Infantry Brigade, 2nd Division. The regiment was transferred with its brigade on 28 June 1927 to Fort D.A. Russell, Wyoming (later redesignated Fort Francis E. Warren). In April 1933, the regiment assumed command and control of parts of the South Dakota Civilian Conservation Corps District. Assigned Reserve officers conducted summer training with the regiment at Fort Warren. When the 2nd Division was converted from a "square" to a "triangular" organization, the 1st Infantry Regiment was relieved from the 2nd Division on 16 October 1939 and assigned to the reactivated 6th Division at Fort Lewis, Washington, being shortly thereafter transferred to Fort Jackson, South Carolina. After maneuvers in Louisiana in May 1940, the division was transferred to Fort Snelling, Minnesota. The division participated in the Second Army Maneuvers at Camp Ripley, Minnesota, in August 1940, in the Second Army Maneuvers in Arkansas in August 1941, and in the GHQ Maneuvers in Louisiana in September–October 1941. After the GHQ Maneuvers the 6th Division was moved to Fort Leonard Wood, Missouri, for permanent station and arrived there on 10 October 1941.

=== World War II ===
The regiment was stationed at Camp Jackson, South Carolina, where it was relieved 16 October 1939 from assignment to the 2nd Division and assigned to the 6th Division. The 6th Division arrived at Fort Jackson on 1939-11-09, and the 1st IR traveled with the division from that point forward. The 1st IR moved to Fort Benning, Georgia on 1940-04-09 to prepare for a series of maneuvers. The 1st IR participated in the Sabine, Louisiana – Texas Maneuver on 1940-05-09. They then moved to Fort Francis E. Warren, Wyoming on 1940-06-03, and then to Fort Leavenworth, Kansas on 1941-04-02, followed by Fort Leonard Wood, Missouri on 1941-05-20. They then moved to Tennessee to participate in maneuvers there. This was followed by a training cycle at the Desert Training Center, while billeted at the Camp Young billeting area from 1942-12-10. The regiment then staged at Camp San Luis Obispo, California on 1943-03-23.

The regiment departed from the San Francisco, California Port of Embarkation on 1943-09-19, and arrived in Hawaii on 1943-09-26.

The 1st IR departed Hawaii on 1944-01-26, and arrived at Milne Bay, New Guinea on 1944-02-07 to participate in the New Guinea Campaign.

1st IR departed Milne Bay on 1944-06-01, and arrived at Toem on 1944-06-14.

1st IR assaulted Sansapor on 1944-07-30, and left New Guinea on 1944-12-26 with the end of the New Guinea Campaign taking place on 1944-12-31.

The 1st IR won a Presidential Unit Citation for its action at Milne Bay.

1st IR assaulted Lingayen Gulf on the Philippine Island of Luzon on 1945-01-09 to participate in the Luzon Campaign.

1st IR moved to Sixth Army Reserve status from 1945-02-10 to 1945-02-23, when they returned to the Luzon Campaign.

1st IR attached to 38th Infantry Division from 1945-04-28 to 1945-05-01, and then was attached to the XI Corps from 1945-06-10 to 1945-06-25, when they returned to 6th Infantry Division Control.

The Luzon Campaign concluded on 1945-07-04.

1st IR was located at Bagabag, Philippine Islands on 1945-08-14. They then moved to Korea on 1945-10-24, which they Occupied through 1949, with garrisons in Taegu and Pusan.

=== Cold War ===
==== Korean War and reactivation ====
On 10 January 1949, 1st IR was inactivated in Korea, and then was reactivated on 4 October 1950 at Fort Ord, California as a training regiment for units being sent to the fight in Korea. On 3 April 1956, the regiment was relieved from assignment to the 6th Infantry Division, and then was assigned on 15 May 1956 to the United States Military Academy at West Point, New York. On 15 May 1958 the regiment was reorganized under the Combat Arms Regimental System as HHC, 1st Battle Group, 1st Infantry Regiment.

In 1960, the 1st Battle Group, 1st Infantry was reorganized under a concept that provided sufficient tactics instructors in the permanent party for continuity, but called for outside augmentation for the summer training program. This left the battle group with a Headquarters, Headquarters and Training Company, Service Company, Airborne Detachment, the 2nd Aviation Detachment, the USMA Band, Detachment 1 and 2 United States Army Hospital, and saw the attachment of the 50th Engineer Battalion (Construction) and the 57th Military Police Company. The old Military Police Detachment personnel formed the nucleus of the newly attached 57th Military Police Company.

On 16 May 1961, the mission of providing tactical instruction for the Corps of Cadets along with the personnel involved, was transferred to a newly created Office of Military Instruction in the Department of Tactics. All enlisted personnel remained assigned to the battle group. On 1 February 1962, Service Company was eliminated and its personnel absorbed into Headquarters Company.

On 1 January 1965, the 1st Battle Group, 1st Infantry was redesigned as the 1st Battalion, 1st Infantry. With the exception of transferring tactical instruction to the Office of Military Instruction (now DMI) in 1961, its mission was essentially unchanged. The 2nd Battalion was then assigned to Fort Benning, Georgia.

==== Vietnam War ====
In 1966, the 2nd Battalion was deployed to Vietnam with the 196th Light Infantry Brigade (196th LIB). In 1967 the 3rd Battalion was activated at Schofield Barracks, Hawaii as part of the 11th Infantry Brigade. After the 11th Brigade arrived in Vietnam, both battalions became components of the Americal Division. These two battalions earned fourteen campaign streamers for the regiment during the war in Vietnam. Also in 1967, the 4th, 5th, and 6th Battalions were activated on 24 November and assigned to the 6th Infantry Division at Fort Campbell, Kentucky. The battalions at Fort Campbell were relieved from assignment to the 6th Infantry Division on 24 July 1968, and inactivated on 21 July 1969.

The 11th Infantry Brigade returned home in 1971, at which time 3rd Battalion was deactivated.

On 11 April 1972 the 2nd Battalion was flown into Phu Bai Combat Base from Danang to provide base security. On 12 April 1972 approximately 50 men from Company C, 2nd Battalion refused to go on a combat patrol in the hills west of Phu Bai, but eventually undertook the patrol. The 2nd Battalion commander Lieutenant colonel Frederick P. Mitchell blamed television newsmen and journalists for inciting the combat refusal.

The 196th Light Infantry Brigade was the last combat brigade to leave Vietnam in June 1972.

Following its tour of duty in Vietnam the 2nd Battalion was sent to Fort Lewis, Washington, where it became part of the 9th Infantry Division. In January 1991 the battalion became part of the 199th Infantry Brigade at Fort Polk, Louisiana, where it remained until inactivation in 1994.

1st Infantry soldiers awarded the Medal of Honor for service in Vietnam:

- Specialist Four Thomas J. McMahon, Company A, 2nd Battalion, 19 January 1969, Quang Tin Province (posthumous)
- Specialist Four Donald Sloat, 3rd Platoon, Delta Company, 2nd Battalion, 17 January 1970, Quảng Nam Province (posthumous)
- Private First Class David F. Winder, HQ & HQ Company, 3rd Battalion, 13 May 1970 (posthumous)

=== Recent history (1994–present) ===
==== Reactivation ====
On 16 December 1994 the 2nd Battalion was reactivated at Fort Wainwright as part of the 6th Infantry Division (Light), which was reduced in size and reflagged as the 172nd Infantry Brigade (Separate) in April 1998.

==== Iraq War ====
In August 2005 2nd Battalion was deployed, along with the 172nd Stryker Brigade, to Mosul Iraq in support of Operation Iraqi Freedom. The battalion conducted counter insurgency operations aimed at securing the city of Mosul from an insurgency headed by the terrorist organization al-Qaeda in Iraq. After 12 months in Mosul 2nd Battalion was preparing to return to home station at Fort Wainwright, Alaska when their deployment was unexpectedly extended by Secretary of Defense Donald Rumsfeld. The 2nd Battalion, along with the entire 172nd Infantry Brigade, was subsequently sent to Baghdad, Iraq to quell rising sectarian violence. The 2nd Battalion returned home in December 2006 after 16 months in Iraq. It was inactivated on 16 December when the 172nd was reflagged as the 1st Stryker Brigade Combat Team, 25th Infantry Division, and the 2-1st Infantry was reflagged as the 1st Battalion, 24th Infantry.

==== War in Afghanistan ====
The battalion was reactivated on 17 April 2007 as part of the 5th Brigade Combat Team, 2nd Infantry Division at Fort Lewis. On 17 February 2009, President Obama ordered 4,000 soldiers of 5th Stryker Brigade Combat Team to Afghanistan, along with 8,000 Marines. The deployment came as a result of the then-worsening situation in the Afghan war. These soldiers were to be deployed in the southeast, on the Afghan border. The brigade was scheduled to return to Joint Base Lewis–McChord in July 2010. After it returned, on 22 July, the 5th BCT was reflagged as the 2nd BCT of the 2nd ID and the battalion continued to serve with the latter.

From June 2009 to June 2010, a group of U.S. Army soldiers from the 1st Infantry Regiment based in FOB RAMROD perpetrated the murders of at least three Afghan civilians. Body parts of the victims, such as finger bones and a skull were collected by the soldiers as war trophies.

== Honors ==
=== Campaign participation credit ===
- War of 1812
1. Canada
2. Lundy's Lane
3. New Orleans
4. Alabama 1814
5. Florida 1814
6. Alabama 1815
7. Louisiana 1815
- Mexican–American War
1. Monterey
2. Vera Cruz
- Civil War
1. Mississippi River
2. Vicksburg
3. Missouri 1861
4. Texas 1861
5. Mississippi 1862
- Indian Wars
1. Miami
2. Creeks
3. Seminoles
4. Black Hawk
5. Apaches
6. Pine Ridge
7. Texas 1850
- Spanish–American War
1. Santiago
- Philippine–American War
1. Samar 1901
- World War II
1. New Guinea (with arrowhead)
2. Luzon (with arrowhead)
- Vietnam
1. Counteroffensive, Phase II
2. Counteroffensive, Phase III
3. Tet Counteroffensive
4. Counteroffensive, Phase IV
5. Counteroffensive, Phase V
6. Counteroffensive, Phase VI
7. Tet 69/Counteroffensive
8. Summer–Fall 1969
9. Winter–Spring 1970
10. Sanctuary Counteroffensive
11. Counteroffensive, Phase VII
12. Consolidation I
13. Consolidation II
14. Cease-Fire
- War on Terrorism
1. Operation Iraqi Freedom III
2. Operation Iraqi Freedom IV
3. Operation Enduring Freedom (Afghanistan)

=== Decorations ===
- Presidential Unit Citation (Army) for Maffin Bay
- Philippine Presidential Unit Citation for 17 October 1944 TO 4 July 1945
- Valorous Unit Award
1. for Quang Tin Province
2. for Iraq 15 August 2005 to 15 December 2006

=== Notable awards / commendations ===
Corporal (R) Stephen Sanford, Company C, 2nd Battalion, was awarded the Distinguished Service Cross for actions in Mosul Iraq during the unit's deployment.

Sergeant First Class Peter Lara, Company C, 2nd Battalion, was awarded the Silver Star for actions in Mosul Iraq during the unit's deployment.

== Heraldry ==
=== Coat of arms ===
==== Blazon ====
- Shield: Per bend Gules and Azure, on a bend or a bendlet Argent indented of seven and counter indented of the same fimbriated Sable.
- Crest: On a wreath of the colors Or and Gules the Arabic numeral "1" Azure fimbriated Or within a garland of laurel Vert.
- Motto: Semper Primus (Always First).

==== Symbolism ====
1. The regiment has a history of fighting in all the wars of the country and a logical grouping divides its campaigns or wars into 14 groups. These are heraldically represented by the 14 notches on the diagonal band across the shield.
2. The upper part of the shield is red, this was the color of the old 2nd Sub-legion. The lower part is blue the modern Infantry color.
3. The crest with the numeral within the laurel wreath of Victory and the motto long in use by the regiment are self-explanatory.

==== Background ====
1. The coat of arms was originally approved on 1922-03-15.
2. It was amended on 1959-08-10.
3. On 1968-11-08 the coat of arms was amended to correct the wording in the blazon of the shield and motto.
4. It was amended on 1999-11-04 to correct the blazon.

=== Distinctive unit insignia ===
==== Description ====
- A gold color metal and enamel device 1 5/32 inches (2.9 cm) in height overall consisting of a shield emblazoned: Per bend Gules and Azure, on a bend or a bendlet Argent indented of seven counter indented of the same fimbriated Sable, the shield surmounting a gold color metal oval belt with three blue enamel stripes parallel to the edges of the oval and surmounted by a plain gold color metal buckle in base and a gold color metal band on each side of the shield bearing the motto "SEMPER" on the dexter band and "PRIMUS" on the sinister band in red enamel letters.

==== Symbolism ====
1. The regiment has a history of fighting in all the wars of the country and a logical grouping divides its campaigns or wars into 14 groups. These are heraldically represented by the 14 notches on the diagonal band across the shield.
2. The upper part of the shield is red, this was the color of the old 2nd Sub-legion.
3. The lower part is blue the modern Infantry color.
4. The motto long in use by the regiment is self-explanatory.

==== Background ====
1. The distinctive unit insignia was originally approved on 1923-09-08.
2. It was amended on 1999-11-04 to add the symbolism and the metric measurements.

== See also ==
- List of United States Regular Army Civil War units
