= James L. Campbell =

US Army general

James L Campbell
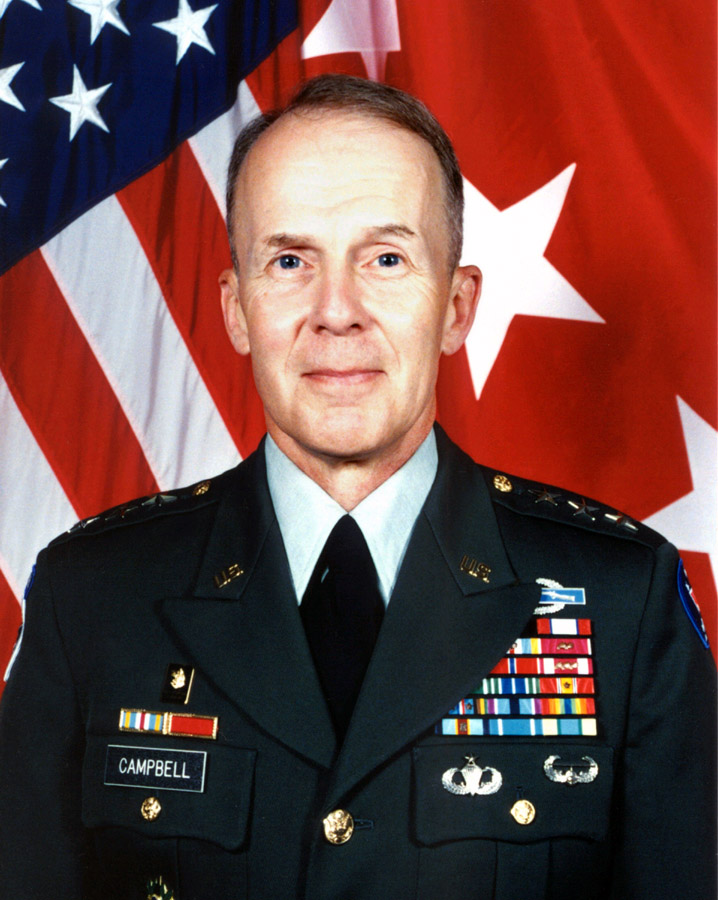
- Born: Fort Benning, Georgia, U.S.
- Military career
- Allegiance: United States of America
- Branch: United States Army
- Service years: 1971–2008
- Rank: Lieutenant General
- Commands: U.S. Army Pacific; 10th Mountain Division
- Awards: Army Distinguished Service Medal; Defense Superior Service Medal (2); Legion of Merit (3); Bronze Star

Lieutenant General James Lowell Campbell (born 16 August 1949) is a retired Lieutenant General in the United States Army and was previously Director of the Army Staff. He previously commanded the U.S. Army, Pacific from November 2002 to August 2004. Commissioned through ROTC, he graduated in 1971 from the University of Missouri with a Bachelor of Science in Physical Education. He went on to earn a Master of Science from the University of Illinois, also in Physical Education, as well as a Master of Arts in National Security and Strategic Studies from the U.S. Naval War College.

Campbell served in several high-profile operations, including Operation Restore Hope in Somalia in 1993, and in Operation Uphold Democracy in Haiti in 1994. During his time as Commanding General of the 10th Mountain Division from 1999 to 2001, he deployed to Bosnia and Herzegovina and served as Commanding General for the Multi-National Division (North) for Operation Joint Forge.

Other major duty assignments for Campbell include commander of the Joint Task Force for Full Accounting for United States Pacific Command. From 1997 to 1999 he served as Assistant Division Commander for the 25th Infantry Division. Prior to his USARPAC command, he served as Special Assistant to the Commanding General at Fort Shafter.

== Awards and decorations ==
Combat Infantryman Badge
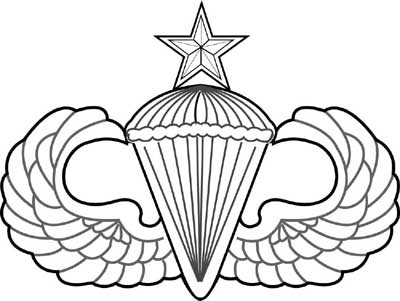
Senior Parachutist Badge
Air Assault Badge
Army Staff Identification Badge
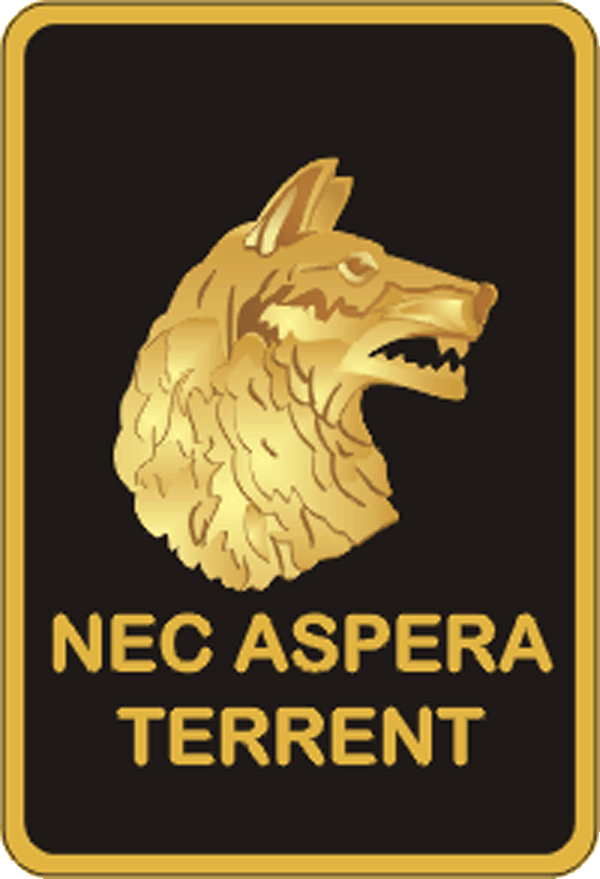
27th Infantry Regiment Distinctive Unit Insignia

Army Distinguished Service Medal
Defense Superior Service Medal with one bronze oak leaf cluster
Legion of Merit with two oak leaf clusters
Bronze Star
Meritorious Service Medal with three oak leaf clusters
Army Commendation Medal
Army Achievement Medal
Joint Meritorious Unit Award
Army Meritorious Unit Commendation
National Defense Service Medal with one bronze service star
Armed Forces Expeditionary Medal with two service stars
Humanitarian Service Medal
Army Service Ribbon
Army Overseas Service Ribbon with bronze award numeral 2
United Nations Operation in Somalia Medal with service star

After his tenure at USARPAC, Campbell was assigned to the staff of the Vice Chief of Staff for the U.S. Army in Washington, D.C., where he served as Senior Vice President, Chief of Staff and Operations for Military Professional Resources Inc.

Military offices
Preceded by Lawson W. Magruder III	Commander, 10th Mountain Division; 1999–2001	Succeeded by Franklin L. Hagenbeck
Preceded by Edwin P. Smith	Commander, United States Army Pacific; 2002–2004	Succeeded by John M. Brown III
