= George K. McGunnegle =

U.S. Army colonel (1854–1938)

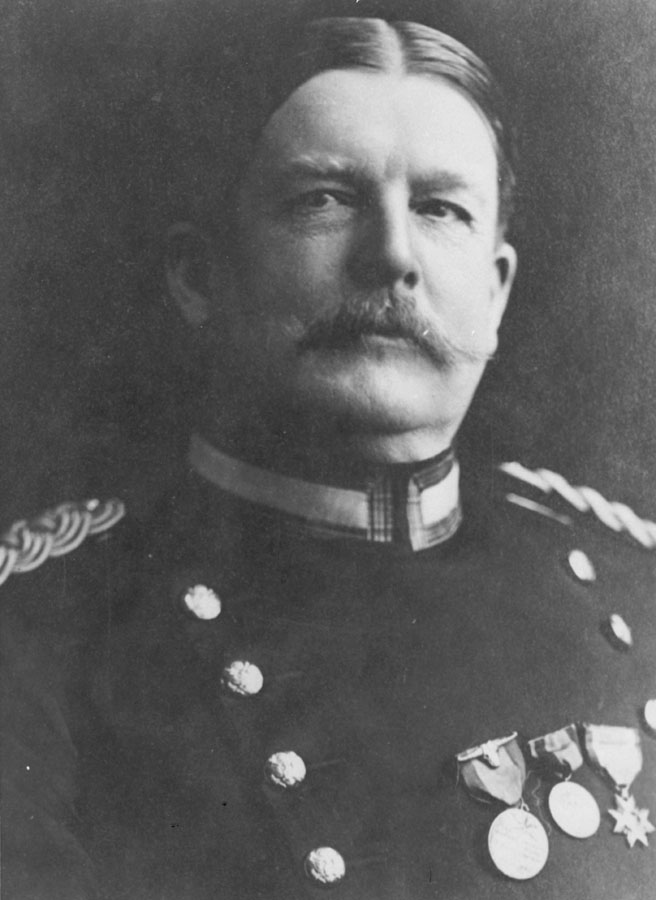
- McGunnegle as colonel commanding 1st Infantry Regiment, circa 1912
- Born: June 23, 1854; Annapolis, Maryland, U.S.
- Died: January 17, 1938 (aged 83); Santa Barbara, California
- Burial place: Arlington National Cemetery
- Education: United States Naval Academy (attended)
- Spouse: Carolina Siquieros Hart (m. 1880-1889, her death)
- Children: 3
- Military career
- Allegiance: United States
- Branch: United States Army
- Service years: 1873-1919
- Rank: Colonel
- Unit: Infantry Branch
- Commands: Company I, 15th Infantry Regiment; Company G, 15th Infantry Regiment; 1st Infantry Regiment; Hawaiian Department; Recruit Depot, Fort McDowell, California
- Conflicts: American Indian Wars; Spanish–American War; United States Military Government in Cuba; Philippine–American War; World War I

George Kennedy McGunnegle (June 23, 1854 – January 17, 1938) was a career officer in the United States Army. He received a direct commission from civilian life in 1873, and served until retiring 1919. McGunnegle attained the rank of colonel and was a veteran of the American Indian Wars, Spanish–American War, United States Military Government in Cuba, Philippine–American War, and World War I. He was most notable for his service in command assignments including the 1st Infantry Regiment and the Fort McDowell Recruit Depot in California.

The son of a United States Navy officer, McGunnegle was born in Annapolis, Maryland and attended St. John's College Preparatory School and the United States Naval Academy. He left the academy before graduating, and in 1873 received a second lieutenant's commission in the army. He served primarily in the 15th Infantry Regiment and was assigned to several posts in the western United States during the American Indian Wars. During the Spanish–American War he was assigned as mustering officer for volunteer soldiers being discharged at the end of their enlistments, and was posted to Washington, D.C., Georgia, and South Carolina. During the post-war United States Military Government in Cuba, McGunnegle was an assistant inspector general on the staff of governor Leonard Wood.

As a member of the 3rd Infantry Regiment and 17th Infantry Regiment, McGunnegle served in the Philippines during the Philippine–American War. After receiving promotion to colonel in 1906, he commanded the 1st Infantry Regiment during service in Washington, the Philippines, and Hawaii. In 1914, he was assigned to command the recruit depot at Fort McDowell, California. He served until reaching the mandatory retirement age of 64 in June 1918. Because World War I was ongoing, McGunnegle agreed to defer retirement and remained on duty at Fort McDowell. The war ended in November 1918, and he remained in command of Fort McDowell to muster out troops as the army demobilized. He retired in July 1919.

In retirement, McGunnegle was a resident of Santa Barbara, California. He died there on January 17, 1938, and was buried at Arlington National Cemetery.

== Early life ==
George K. McGunnegle was born in Annapolis, Maryland on June 23, 1854, the son of United States Navy officer Wilson McGunnegle and Isabella Steele Ray. (Note: After Wilson McGunnegle died, Isabella Ray married Army officer Marcus Reno.) He was educated in Annapolis, and attended St. John's College Preparatory School. In 1870, President Ulysses S. Grant nominated McGunnegle for an at-large appointment to the United States Naval Academy. He attended as a member of the class of 1875, but left before graduating.

== Start of career ==
In August 1873, Grant nominated McGunnegle for a direct commission in the United States Army, and he received appointment as a second lieutenant. Initially slated for assignment as a Cavalry officer with the 9th Cavalry Regiment, when he accepted his commission in October, he was assigned to the Infantry and named to fill a vacancy in the 15th Infantry Regiment at Fort Bayard, New Mexico. In 1876 he performed temporary recruiting duty at Columbus Barracks, Ohio. In 1877, he was promoted to first lieutenant. In the late 1879 he performed temporary duty at Fort Bliss, Texas, after which he was posted to the Mescalero Agency near Fort Stanton, New Mexico.

During the 1880s, McGunnegle continued to serve with the 15th Infantry in the Western United States. In 1884, he was appointed quartermaster officer of the 15th Infantry with duty at Fort Abraham Lincoln, Dakota Territory. In 1885 and 1886, he performed temporary recruiting duty at Camp Poplar River, Montana Territory. In March 1888, McGunnegle was serving as adjutant of the 15th Infantry at Fort Buford, Dakota Territory when the quarters in which he resided with the regimental quartermaster caught fire; the building was destroyed, but both officers escaped unharmed. In June 1891, McGunnegle received promotion to captain and was assigned to command the 15th Regiment's Company I at Fort Sheridan, Illinois. In 1896, the 15th Infantry was assigned to duty in Arizona and New Mexico, and McGunnegle was assigned to command of Company G at Fort Bayard.

== Continued career ==
During the Spanish–American War in 1898, McGunnegle was on leave visiting family in Annapolis when the 15th Infantry traveled to Huntsville, Alabama for organization and training prior to departing for combat in Cuba. McGunnegle anticipated joining the regiment in Huntsville, but subsequently received orders to perform duty as mustering officer for members of the District of Columbia National Guard who were being discharged after completing their terms of federal service. In late 1898 and early 1899, McGunnegle served as mustering out officer in Georgia and South Carolina for soldiers who were being discharged from active duty. In mid-1899, he was assigned to recruiting duty in Baltimore, with responsibility for enlisting soldiers to fill temporary units created for service in the Philippine–American War. He was promoted to major in December 1899.

After his promotion, McGunnegle traveled to Cuba, where he served as an assistant inspector general on the staff of General Leonard Wood during Wood's command of the post-war United States Military Government in Cuba. McGunnegle was subsequently assigned to the 3rd Infantry Regiment, which performed duty in the Philippines during the Philippine–American War. In 1903, McGunnegle was assigned to the 17th Infantry Regiment and performed temporary duty as inspector of the Washington National Guard, then served again in the Philippines. He was promoted to lieutenant colonel in July 1903. He completed this tour of duty in the Philippines in 1905.

In July 1906, was promoted to colonel and assigned to command the 1st Infantry Regiment. McGunnegle led the regiment during duty in the Philippines, after which it was assigned to Hawaii. McGunnegle continued in command after the 1st Infantry was reassigned, this time to Vancouver Barracks, Washington. In 1912, the 1st Infantry was again assigned to Hawaii, where McGunnegle continued in command. From December 1912 to February 1913, he was acting commander of the Hawaiian Department. In July 1914, McGunnegle completed his time in regimental command and was assigned to command of the recruit depot at Fort McDowell, California.

Harris and Ewing photo of McGunnegle as colonel and commander of the 1st Infantry Regiment, circa 1910.

McGunnegle continued in command of Fort McDowell until reaching the mandatory retirement age of 64 in June 1918. Because the United States had entered World War I the previous year, McGunnegle remained on active duty and continued to command Fort McDowell. He remained on duty after the war ended in November 1918, and retired permanently in July 1919.

== Later life ==
In retirement, McGunnegle was a resident of Santa Barbara, California. He died in Santa Barbara on January 17, 1938. McGunnegle was buried at Arlington National Cemetery.

== Family ==
In August 1880, McGunnegle married Carolina Siquieros Hart of El Paso, Texas. They were the parents of three children—Juan, Corina, and Isabel. In 1889, Carolina McGunnegle died of tuberculosis at Fort Buford, Dakota Territory. Shortly afterwards, Juan and Corina died of diphtheria. McGunnegle did not remarry.

In 1913, Isabel McGunnegle married Army officer Philip H. Sheridan Jr., the son of General Philip Sheridan. The younger Sheridan was a major when he died in 1918. In 1925, Isabel McGunnegle married Charles Elliott Perkins II, the son of railroad executive Charles Elliott Perkins.
