= 1st Battalion, 1st Infantry Regiment =

- Country: United States Army
- Allegiance: 1st Infantry Regiment
- Branch: Infantry
- Type: Battalion
- Anniversaries: 3 March 1791

The 1st Battalion, 1st Infantry Regiment is an infantry battalion in the 1st Infantry Regiment of the United States Army.

== Lineage ==
Constituted 3 March 1791 in the Regular Army as a company of the 2d Infantry

Organized in March 1791 in New England

Redesignated in 1792 as a company of the Infantry of the 2d Sub-Legion

Redesignated 31 October 1796 as a company of the 2d Infantry

Consolidated May–October 1815 with a company each of the 3d and 7th Infantry (both constituted 12 April 1808) and a company of the 44th Infantry (constituted 29 January 1813) to form a company of the 1st Infantry

Designated 21 August 1816 as Company A, 1st Infantry

Consolidated in April 1869 with Company A, 43d Infantry, Veteran Reserve Corps (constituted 21 September 1866), and consolidated unit designated as Company A, 1st Infantry

(1st Infantry assigned 11 September 1918 to the 13th Division; relieved 8 March 1919 from assignment to the 13th Division; assigned 27 July 1921 to the 2d Division; relieved 16 October 1939 from assignment to the 2d Division and assigned to the 6th Division [later redesignated as the 6th Infantry Division])

Inactivated 10 January 1949 in Korea

Activated 4 October 1950 at Fort Ord, California

(1st Infantry relieved 3 April 1956 from assignment to the 6th Infantry Division; assigned 15 May 1956 to the United States Military Academy)

Reorganized and redesignated 15 May 1958 as Headquarters and Headquarters Company, 1st Battle Group, 1st Infantry, and remained assigned to the United States Military Academy (organic elements concurrently constituted and activated)

Redesignated 31 December 1964 as the 1st Battalion, 1st Infantry

== Campaign participation credit ==
* signifies that the unit has Earned credit for being in the battle
War of 1812

- Canada
- Lundy's Lane
- New Orleans
- Alabama 1814
- Florida 1814
- Alabama 1815
- Louisiana 1815*

Mexican War

- Monterey
- Vera Cruz

Civil War

- Mississippi River
- Vicksburg
- Missouri 1861
- Texas 1861
- Mississippi 1862*

Indian Wars

- Miami*
- Creeks
- Seminoles
- Black Hawk
- Apaches
- Pine Ridge
- Texas 1850

War with Spain

- Santiago*

Philippine Insurrection

- Samar 1901

World War II

- New Guinea* (with arrowhead)
- Luzon *(with arrowhead)

== Honors ==
- Presidential Unit Citation (Army) for MAFFIN BAY
- Philippine Presidential Unit Citation for 17 OCTOBER 1944 TO 4 JULY 1945
