= John P. Johnson (general) =

American general

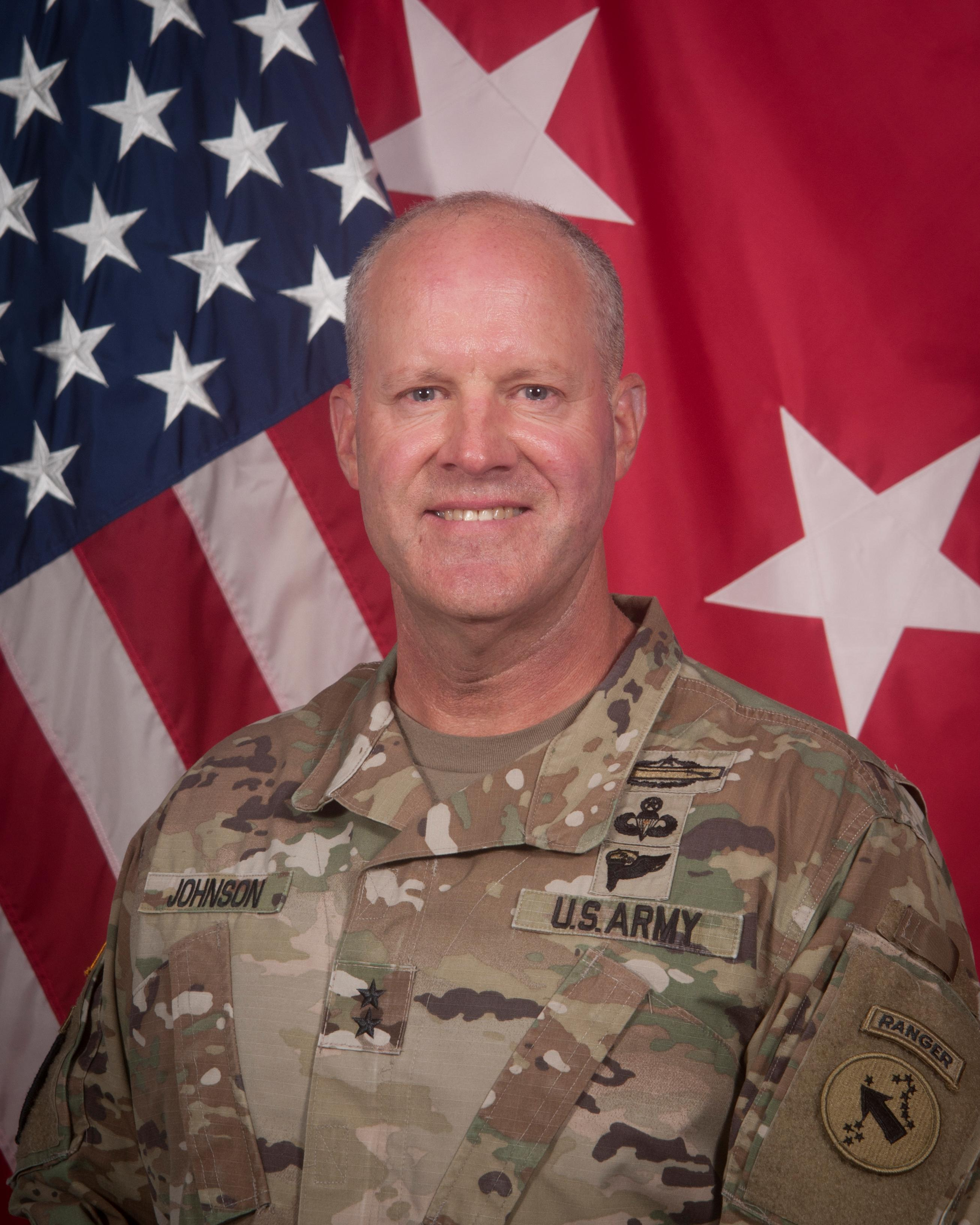

John P. "Pete" Johnson (born January 22, 1963) is a retired major general in the United States Army. He was previously one of two deputy commanding generals (South) of United States Army Pacific. Johnson previously served as the 49th Commander of the U.S. Army Training Center and Fort Jackson in Columbia, South Carolina. He was promoted to major general while serving at Fort Jackson. Before that, Johnson served in the 1st Ranger Battalion and fought in Operation Just Cause in Panama, deployed with Special Operations Command, was a battalion commander and the operations officer for the 82nd Airborne Division, and a brigade commander with the 101st Airborne Division.

Born in Florida, Johnson is a 1985 graduate of the United States Military Academy. He earned an M.S. degree in operations research from the Naval Postgraduate School in 1995 and a second master's degree in strategic studies from the Army War College. Johnson has received three Distinguished Service Medals, four awards of the Legion of Merit and four Bronze Star Medals. He retired on July 8, 2020, after 35 years in the U.S. Army. He is married with three children.
