= Francis J. Wiercinski =

US Army general

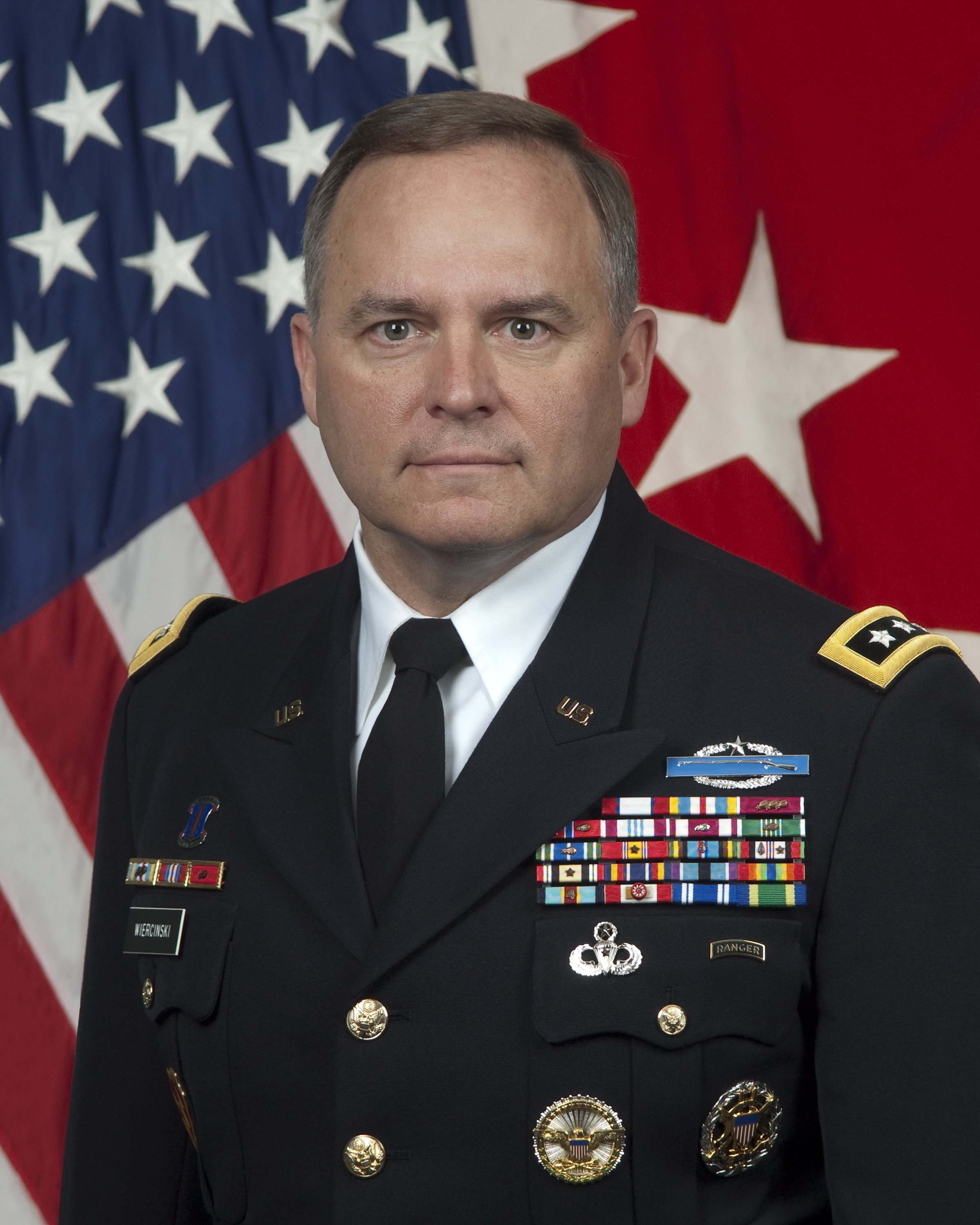
- Wiercinski in May 2011
- Born: November 19, 1956 (age 69); Pennsylvania, United States
- Military career
- Allegiance: United States
- Branch: United States Army
- Service years: 1979–2013
- Rank: Lieutenant general
- Nickname: "Frank"
- Commands: United States Army Pacific; United States Army, Japan; 187th Infantry Regiment; 6th Ranger Training Battalion
- Conflicts: United States invasion of Panama; War in Afghanistan; Iraq War
- Awards: Army Distinguished Service Medal (2); Defense Superior Service Medal; Legion of Merit (4); Bronze Star Medal (2)

Francis John "Frank" Wiercinski (born November 19, 1956) is a former United States Army officer who was the Commander United States Army Pacific (USARPAC). Wiercinski joined the United States Army in 1979 and retired in 2013.

== Career ==
On December 20, 1989, then Captain Wiercinski, Company Commander of Bravo Company, 3/75 Ranger Regiment, led his rangers during a night-time combat jump into Rio Hato, Panama during Operation Just Cause, assisting in the regiment's successful seizure of the airfield.

He was previously the Deputy Commander for Support, of the Multinational Division North, Iraq. The troops under his command were responsible for a large part of Iraq, stretching from Baghdad to the Turkish border, and east and west to the borders of Iran and Syria.

During Operation Anaconda (2002), in Afghanistan, Wiercinski (then a colonel) was commander of the 187th Infantry Regiment (a. k. a. "The Rakkasans"), 3rd Brigade, 101st Airborne Division (Air Assault).

He previously held a job as Senior Vice President and managing director of Asia-Pacific Region, Cubic Global Defense before joining Raytheon in 2020 as their vice president for Missile Defense Requirements and Capabilities.

== Awards and decorations ==
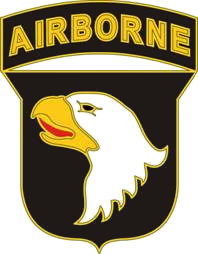
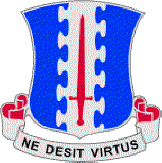
Combat Infantryman Badge (2 awards)
Master Parachutist Badge with one bronze Combat Jump Device
Ranger tab
Office of the Secretary of Defense Identification Badge
Joint Chiefs of Staff Identification Badge
101st Airborne Division Combat Service Identification Badge
187th Infantry Regiment Distinctive Unit Insignia
4 Overseas Service Bars

Army Distinguished Service Medal with one bronze oak leaf cluster
Defense Superior Service Medal
Legion of Merit with three bronze oak leaf clusters
Bronze Star with "V" Device and oak leaf cluster
Defense Meritorious Service Medal
Meritorious Service Medal with silver oak leaf cluster
Army Commendation Medal with oak leaf cluster
Army Achievement Medal with oak leaf cluster
Joint Meritorious Unit Award with two oak leaf clusters
Valorous Unit Award
Meritorious Unit Commendation
Superior Unit Award
National Defense Service Medal with one bronze service star
Armed Forces Expeditionary Medal with Arrowhead device
Afghanistan Campaign Medal with Arrowhead device and service star
Iraq Campaign Medal with service star
Global War on Terrorism Service Medal
Humanitarian Service Medal
Army Service Ribbon
Army Overseas Service Ribbon with bronze award numeral 4
Order of the Rising Sun (Japan) 2nd Class, Gold and Silver Star
Meritorious Service Medal (Canada, military version)
Montana Distinguished Service Medal
Unidentified award
Hawaiian Medal of Honor

Military offices
Preceded by Benjamin R. Mixon	Commander, United States Army Pacific; 2010–2013	Succeeded by Vincent K. Brooks
