= John M. Brown III =

US Army general

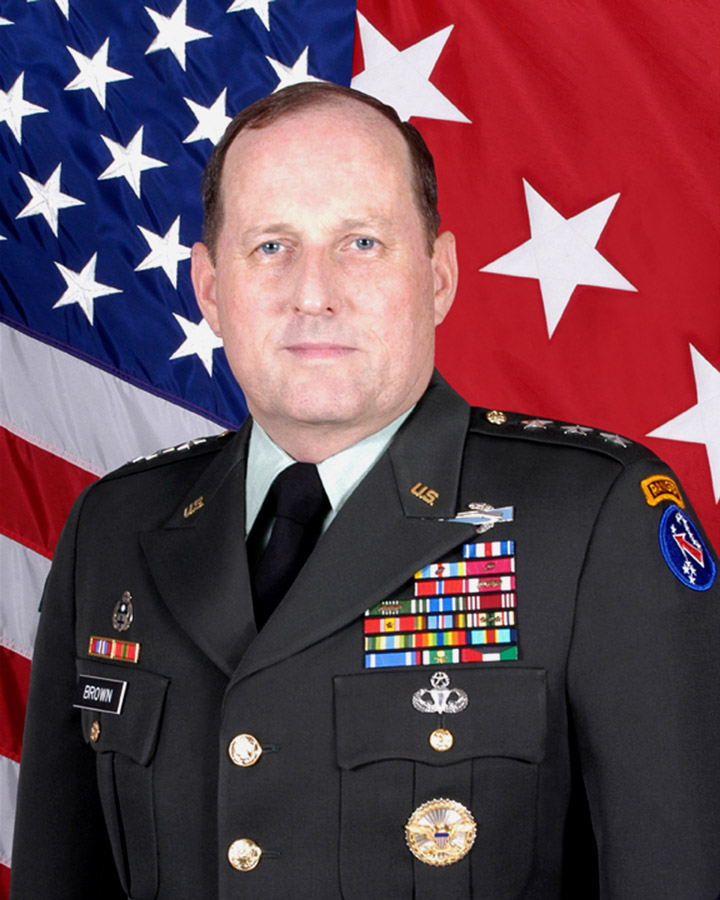
- Born: Atlanta, Georgia, U.S.
- Military career
- Allegiance: United States
- Branch: United States Army
- Service years: 1969–2008
- Rank: Lieutenant General
- Commands: United States Army Pacific; United States Army Alaska; 1st Brigade, 24th Infantry Division; 3rd Battalion, 5th Cavalry Regiment
- Conflicts: Gulf War; Operation Joint Endeavor
- Awards: Army Distinguished Service Medal; Silver Star; Defense Superior Service Medal (2); Legion of Merit (2); Bronze Star Medal

John M. Brown III is a retired lieutenant general of the United States Army. He served as Commander of United States Army Pacific, headquartered at Fort Shafter, Hawaii, from August 25, 2004, to February 1, 2008. He enlisted in the Army as an infantryman in 1969 and became an officer upon completion of Infantry Officer Candidate School in 1971 where he was commissioned a second lieutenant of Infantry.

== Early life and education ==
Brown holds a bachelor's degree in biology from West Georgia College and a master's degree in Industrial Management from the Georgia Institute of Technology. He is a graduate of the Infantry Officer's Advance Course, Army Command and General Staff College, and the National War College.

He was born in Atlanta, Georgia, graduated from Avondale High School in 1965, and is the oldest of five. He has a wife and two daughters.

== Career ==
His command experience includes Commander, Combat Support Company, 1st Battalion, 26th Infantry, 1st Infantry Division in Germany; Commander, Headquarters and Special Troops Battalion, XVIII Airborne Corps, Fort Bragg, North Carolina, and Operation Golden Pheasant, Honduras; Commander, 3rd Battalion, 5th Cavalry, 3rd Armored Division, in Germany and the Gulf War, Saudi Arabia; Commander, 1st Brigade, 24th Infantry Division, Fort Stewart, Georgia, and Operation Vigilant Warrior, Kuwait; and Commander, United States Army Alaska.

Additional assignments include Executive Officer, 1st Battalion, 38th Infantry Regiment, 2nd Infantry Division in the Republic of Korea; Professor of Military Science, Southern Arkansas University, Magnolia, Arkansas; Chief of Staff, 1st Armored Division, United States Army Europe and Seventh Army, Germany and Task Force Eagle, Operation Joint Endeavor, Bosnia; Military Assistant to the Deputy Secretary of Defense, Washington D.C.; Assistant Division Commander (Forward), 10th Mountain Division, Operation Joint Forge, Bosnia; Director of Integration, Office of the Deputy Chief of Staff for Operations and Plans, United States Army, Washington D.C.; Deputy Chief of Staff for Training, United States Army Training and Doctrine Command, Fort Monroe, Virginia; and Deputy Commanding General for Transformation, U.S. Army Training and Doctrine Command, Fort Lewis, Washington.

== Awards and decorations ==
Combat Infantryman Badge
Expert Infantryman Badge
Ranger tab
Master Parachutist Badge
Office of the Secretary of Defense Identification Badge
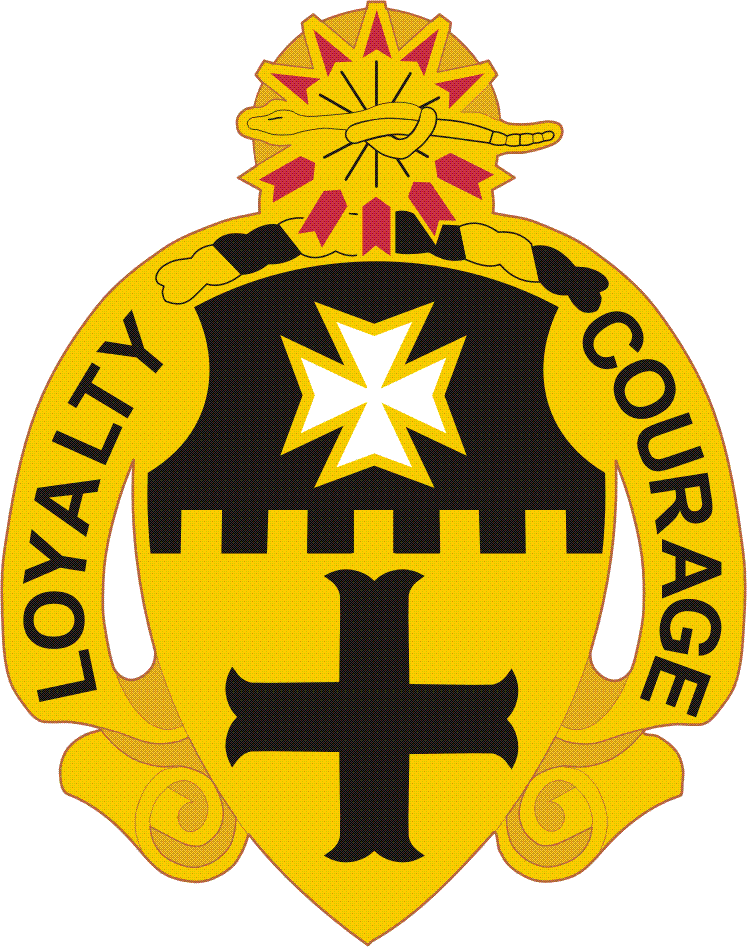
5th Cavalry Regiment Distinctive Unit Insignia

Army Distinguished Service Medal
Silver Star
Defense Superior Service Medal with one bronze oak leaf cluster
Legion of Merit with one oak leaf cluster
Bronze Star
Meritorious Service Medal with three oak leaf clusters
Army Commendation Medal with three oak leaf clusters
Army Achievement Medal
Valorous Unit Award
Superior Unit Award
Army Good Conduct Medal
National Defense Service Medal with one bronze service star
Armed Forces Expeditionary Medal
Southwest Asia Service Medal with three service stars
Armed Forces Service Medal
Army Service Ribbon
Army Overseas Service Ribbon
NATO Medal for Former Yugoslavia
Kuwait Liberation Medal (Saudi Arabia)
Kuwait Liberation Medal (Kuwait)

Military offices
Preceded by James L. Campbell	Commander of the United States Army Pacific; 2004–2008	Succeeded by Benjamin R. Mixon
