= Stephen Silvasy Jr. =

United States Army general

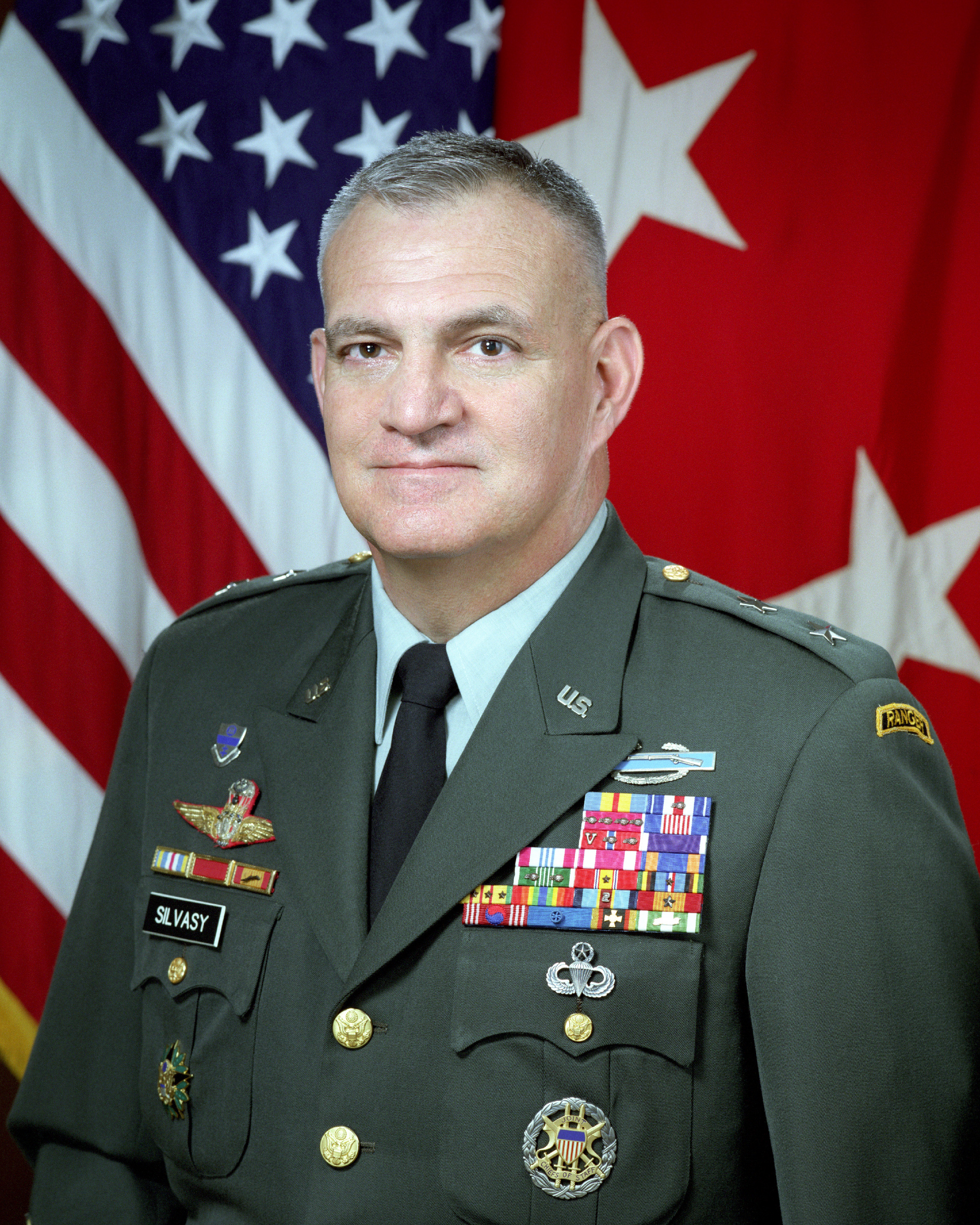
- Born: October 24, 1941 (age 84); Philadelphia, Pennsylvania
- Military career
- Allegiance: United States
- Branch: United States Army
- Service years: 1963–1998
- Rank: Major General
- Commands: United States Army Pacific
- Conflicts: Dominican Civil War; Vietnam War; Invasion of Grenada
- Awards: Defense Distinguished Service Medal (2); Distinguished Service Medal; Silver Star (2); Legion of Merit (5); Soldier's Medal; Bronze Star Medal (3); Purple Heart

Stephen Silvasy Jr. (born October 24, 1941) was a major general in the United States Army who served as acting commander of United States Army Pacific in 1996. He is an alumnus of the US Military Academy and US Naval Postgraduate School. He also received military education at the Armed Forces Staff College and US Army War College.

== Career ==
Silvasy saw combat duty in three countries. From 1964 to 1965 he participated in the US intervention in the Dominican Republic with the 82nd Airborne Division. From 1966 to 1967 he served with the 101st Airborne Division in Vietnam. In 1983 he was back with the 82nd Airborne for the invasion of Grenada.

As a young Lieutenant Colonel Silvasy was stationed in Korea between 1976 and 1978 as Battalion Commander of the 1/32nd Infantry Regiment, 3rd Brigade, 2nd Infantry Division with forward base at Camp Howze. The 1/32nd Infantry was a Congressional approved combat unit for the Demilitarized Zone. Before the unit temporarily disbanded on 28 May 1978 under the orders of President Jimmy Carter, Silvasy served with Richard A. Kidd who ultimately became the Ninth Sergeant Major of the Army.

Some of Silvasy's key duty assignments were as Director of the Operational Plans and Interoperability Directorate for the Joint Staff at the Pentagon. In Korea he served as Assistant Chief of Staff for the UN Command in Seoul. He also served as Deputy Chief of Staff for Doctrine and Development with the US Army Training and Doctrine Command (TRADOC) in Fort Monroe, Virginia. He was also Deputy Commanding General of US Army Pacific prior to his stint as commander.

== Awards and decorations ==
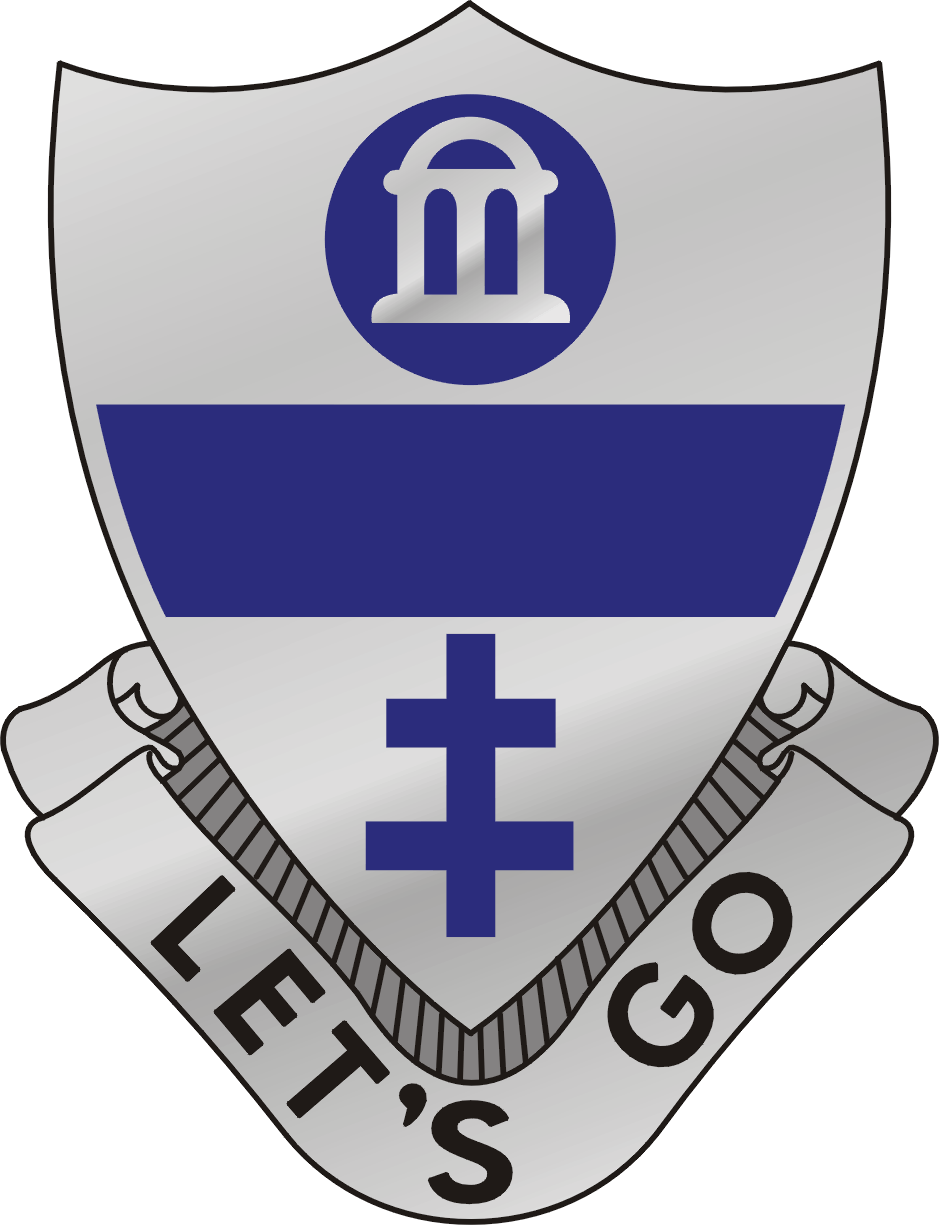
Combat Infantryman Badge
Ranger tab
Master Parachutist Badge
Joint Chiefs of Staff Identification Badge
Army Staff Identification Badge
325th Infantry Regiment Distinctive Unit Insignia
Thai Parachutist Badge

Defense Distinguished Service Medal with one bronze oak leaf cluster
Army Distinguished Service Medal
Silver Star
Legion of Merit with four oak leaf clusters
Soldier's Medal
Bronze Star Medal with "V" device and two oak leaf clusters
Purple Heart
Defense Meritorious Service Medal
Meritorious Service Medal
Air Medal
Army Commendation Medal with two oak leaf clusters
Joint Meritorious Unit Award
Meritorious Unit Commendation
National Defense Service Medal with one bronze service star
Armed Forces Expeditionary Medal with service star
Vietnam Service Medal with four service stars
Army Service Ribbon
Army Overseas Service Ribbon with bronze award numeral 2
Vietnam Gallantry Cross with gold star
Order of National Security Merit, Cheon-Su Medal (Republic of Korea)
French National Order of Merit, Officer
Bundeswehr Gold Cross of Honor
Vietnam Gallantry Cross Unit Citation
Vietnam Campaign Medal
