= James Madison Lee =

United States Army general

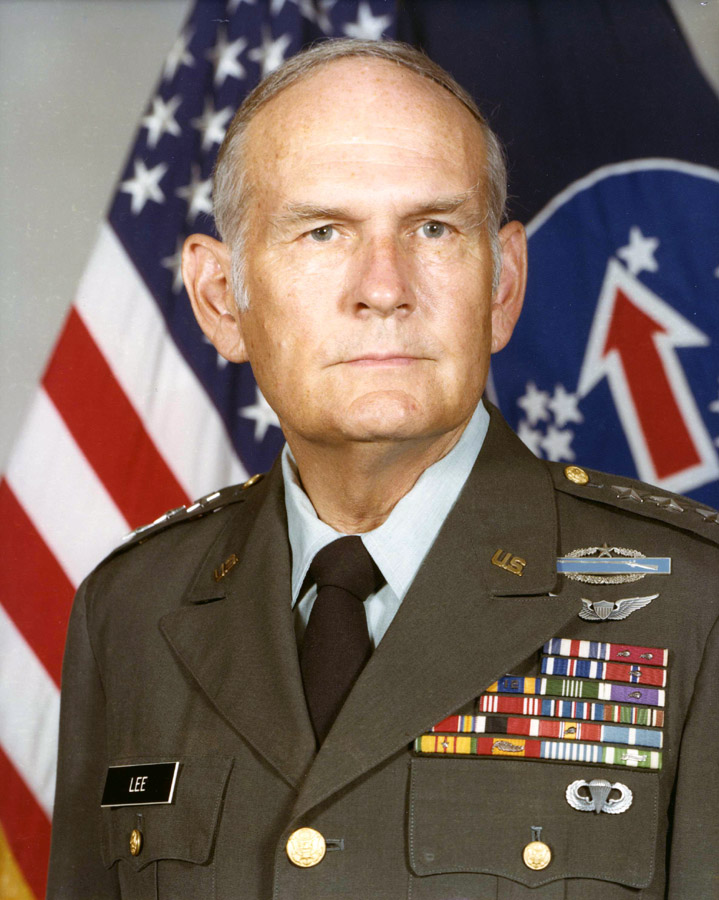
- Born: October 15, 1926; Wilmington, North Carolina, U.S.
- Died: September 11, 2017 (aged 90); Wilmington, North Carolina, U.S.
- Military career
- Allegiance: United States of America
- Branch: United States Army
- Service years: 1944–1985
- Rank: Lieutenant general
- Conflicts: World War II; Korean War; Vietnam War
- Awards: Silver Star

James Madison Lee (October 15, 1926 – September 11, 2017) was a lieutenant general in the United States Army who served as commander of United States Army Pacific (Western Command) from 1983 until his retirement in 1985. Enlisting in the Army Air Corps Reserve in 1944, Lee served during World War II. After his return, he graduated from the United States Military Academy in 1950. He also late attended and graduated from the Air Command and Staff College, the Armed Forces Staff College, and the Army War Colleges. Lee also served in the Vietnam War and Korean War, commanding infantry in each. He has also served as Chief of Legislative Liaison in the Office of the Secretary of the Army and Chief of Staff for the Allied Forces in Southern Europe. He retired in 1985 and died on September 11, 2017.

== Awards and decorations ==

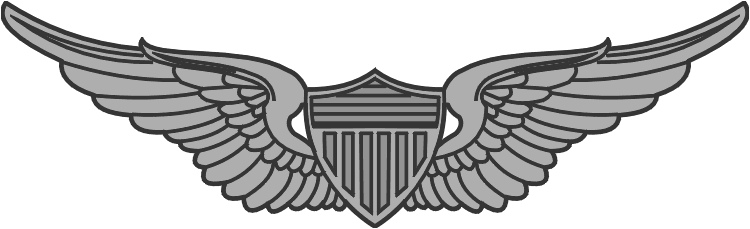

Badge	Combat Infantryman Badge (2 awards)			
Badge	Basic Army Aviator Badge			
1st Row		Silver Star	Legion of Merit with two bronze oak leaf clusters	
2nd Row	Distinguished Flying Cross	Bronze Star Medal with oak leaf cluster	Air Medal with award numerals 12	Army Commendation Medal
3rd Row	Purple Heart with oak leaf cluster	American Campaign Medal	European-African-Middle Eastern Campaign Medal	World War II Victory Medal
4th Row	Army Good Conduct Medal	Army of Occupation Medal	National Defense Service Medal with oak leaf cluster	Korean Service Medal
5th Row	Vietnam Service Medal with 5 campaign stars	Vietnam Gallantry Cross with palm	United Nations Korea Medal	Vietnam Campaign Medal
Badge	Basic Parachutist Badge			
