= John Philip Wisser =

United States Army general

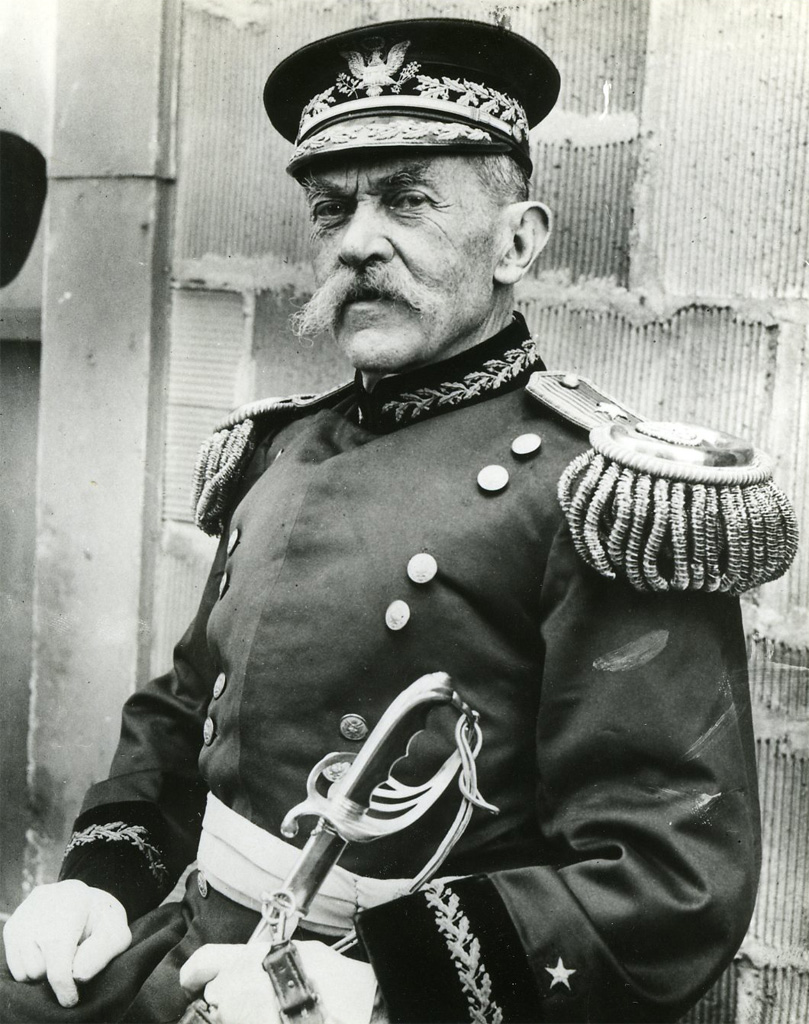
- John P. Wisser
- Born: July 19, 1852; St. Louis, Missouri
- Died: January 20, 1927 (aged 74); San Francisco, California
- Burial place: San Francisco National Cemetery
- Military career
- Allegiance: United States of America
- Branch: United States Army
- Service years: 1874–1918
- Rank: Brigadier general
- Commands: Hawaiian Department
- Conflicts: World War I
- Other work: author

John Philip Wisser (July 19, 1852 – January 20, 1927) was a brigadier general in the United States Army.

== Biography ==
He was born in St. Louis, Missouri, and graduated from Central High School of St. Louis in 1870.

In 1874, he graduated from the United States Military Academy at West Point, New York. Receiving an assignment to the 1st Artillery, he served on garrison duty in Florida and Massachusetts until May 1876, when he was ordered to the U. S. Artillery School at Fort Monroe.

After 1878, he was connected almost continuously with the academic staff of instructors at the U. S. Military Academy, chiefly in the department of chemistry, mineralogy, and geology. On 13 January 1880, he was promoted to 1st lieutenant. During 1884, he studied at the Freiberg, Saxony, school of mines, and at the agricultural experiment station at Wiesbaden. He was requested to investigate and report upon the system of instruction at the military schools of England, France, Germany, and Austria, and to attend and report upon the maneuvers of the 17th Corps of the French army in 1884. Lieut. Wisser was aide-de-camp to Gen. John Gibbon during the Chinese troubles in Washington territory in 1886, but in August of that year he returned to the U. S. Military Academy. He was a member of the Chemical Society of Berlin and of the American Association for the Advancement of Science.

He was the Commanding General of the Hawaiian Department of the United States Army from November 6, 1915, to May 12, 1916, and again from September 14, 1917, to May 19, 1918. He died on January 20, 1927.

== Publications ==
- Chemical Manipulations (Fort Monroe, 1883)
- Short Historical Sketch of Gunpowder (New York, 1883)
- Compressed Gun-Cotton for Military Use (1886)
- Report on the Manœuvres of the 17th Corps of the Army of France (Vancouver Barracks, W. T., 1886)
- Practical Instruction in Minor Tactics and Strategy (New York, 1888)
- Report on the Military Schools of Europe: I., Austria (1889)
- The tactics of coast defense (1902)
- A military and naval dictionary with Henry Colford Gauss (1905)

== Legacy ==
- Wisser Road at Fort Shafter.
