= Benjamin R. Mixon =

US Army general

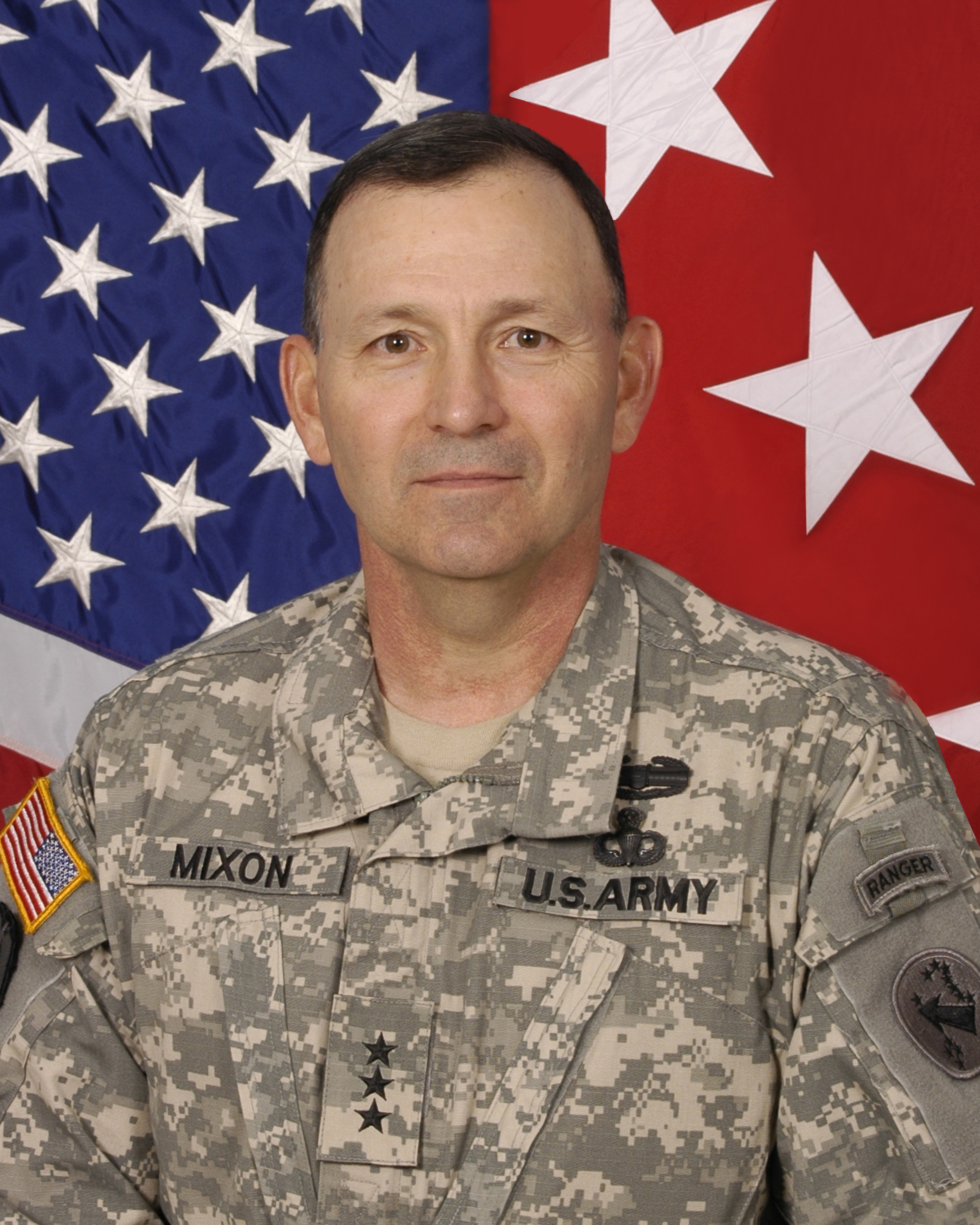
- Lieutenant General Mixon as Commanding General of U.S. Army Pacific Command
- Born: March 6, 1953 (age 73)
- Military career
- Allegiance: United States of America
- Branch: United States Army
- Service years: 1975-2011
- Rank: Lieutenant General
- Commands: United States Army Pacific; 25th Infantry Division; 1st Brigade, 327th Infantry Regiment; 3rd Battalion, 325th Regiment; Company C, 3rd Battalion, 75th Ranger Regiment; Company B, 1st Battalion, 15th Infantry Regiment; Company commander, 2nd Battalion, 505th Infantry Regiment
- Conflicts: Operation Desert Shield; Operation Desert Storm; Operation Enduring Freedom; Operation Iraqi Freedom
- Awards: Army Distinguished Service Medal; Defense Superior Service Medal (3); Legion of Merit (4)

Benjamin Randaulph "Randy" Mixon (born March 6, 1953) is a retired lieutenant general in the United States Army who last served as commanding general of United States Army Pacific. Prior to that, Mixon served as the commander of the Multi-National Division North in Iraq.

He retired from Army on May 1, 2011, after 36 years of service.

== Early life ==
In 1975 Mixon graduated from North Georgia College, one of the six Senior military colleges in the United States.

== Army career ==
Mixon was commissioned as a second lieutenant of Infantry in 1975 and was subsequently assigned to the 2nd Battalion of the 505th Parachute Regiment, 82nd Airborne Division. He served as both a platoon leader and company commander. After the 82nd Mixon attended and then graduated from the Infantry Officer Advanced Course and was reassigned to the 3rd Infantry Division (Mechanized), in Würzburg. While there, he served on the division staff and commanded Company B of the 1st Battalion of the 15th Infantry Regiment in Kitzingen, Germany. His subsequent assignments include duty as assistant operations officer, Readiness Group Knox at Fort Knox and as company commander for Company C, 3rd Battalion, 75th Ranger Regiment, and liaison officer for the 75th Ranger Regiment.

From 1988 to 1991, Mixon served as the executive officer of the 3rd Battalion of the 502nd Infantry Regiment, and chief of plans for the 101st Airborne Division at Fort Campbell. It was during this tour that Mixon deployed to Operation Desert Shield and Operation Desert Storm. In October 1991 he was assigned to the 3rd Battalion of the 325th Regiment in Vicenza, Italy until June 1994. After leaving Italy Mixon moved to the staff of the 101st Airborne Division. He assumed command of the Division's 1st Brigade, 327th Infantry Regiment from October 1996 to August 1998. before returning to a staff position from August 1998 to June 1999.

Mixon left the 101st to serve as the director of joint training and exercises for the United States Joint Forces Command from June 1999 to July 2001 and from July 2001 to June 2002, as the assistant division commander (operations) for the 82nd Airborne Division. Mixon was then promoted to chief of staff, XVIII Airborne Corps in Fort Bragg from July 2002 until June 2003. During that time he deployed to Baghram Air Base in Afghanistan, where he participated in Operation Enduring Freedom as the director of the staff of the Combined Joint Task Force 180. Upon returning, he served as the director of operations, J3, United States Southern Command.

In July 2005 Mixon took command of the 25th Infantry Division at Schofield Barracks until January 2008. While commanding the 25th Mixon deployed to Operation Iraqi Freedom and commanded both Task Force Lightning and Multi-National Division North in Iraq. During this time that Mixon oversaw heavy fighting in the Diyala province. It was during his time as commander of all coalition forces in northern Iraq that Mixon became an early and public proponent of the surge strategy in Iraq. Upon relinquishing command of the 25th Infantry Division in February 2008, Mixon assumed command of United States Army Pacific.

He retired from Army on May 1, 2011, after 36 years of service.

== Don't Ask Don't Tell ==
On March 8, 2010, Lt Gen Mixon wrote a letter to the editor of Stars and Stripes outlining his opposition to a proposed repeal of the Pentagon's Don't ask, don't tell policy. In the letter, Mixon challenged the notion that the majority of service members support a change in the policy and advocated both service members and their families to speak out in opposition to any change. Both Secretary of Defense Robert Gates and chairman of the Joint Chiefs of Staff Admiral Mike Mullen publicly rebuked Mixon saying that because of Mixon's status as an active military general such a public statement was "inappropriate". Although some recommended it, he was never formally reprimanded for his actions. On March 31, 2010, Army Secretary John McHugh said, “We consider the matter closed as of today,” and went on to say that Mixon would "not be reprimanded or asked to resign" because of the comments.

== Awards and decorations ==
Combat Action Badge
Ranger tab
Master Parachutist Badge
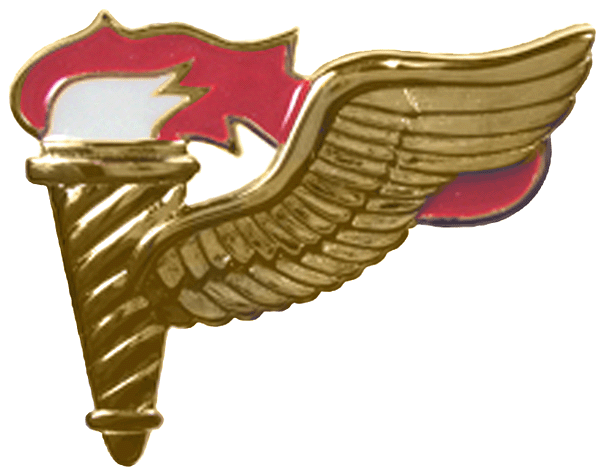
Pathfinder Badge
Air Assault Badge
British Army Parachutist Badge
25th Infantry Division Combat Service Identification Badge
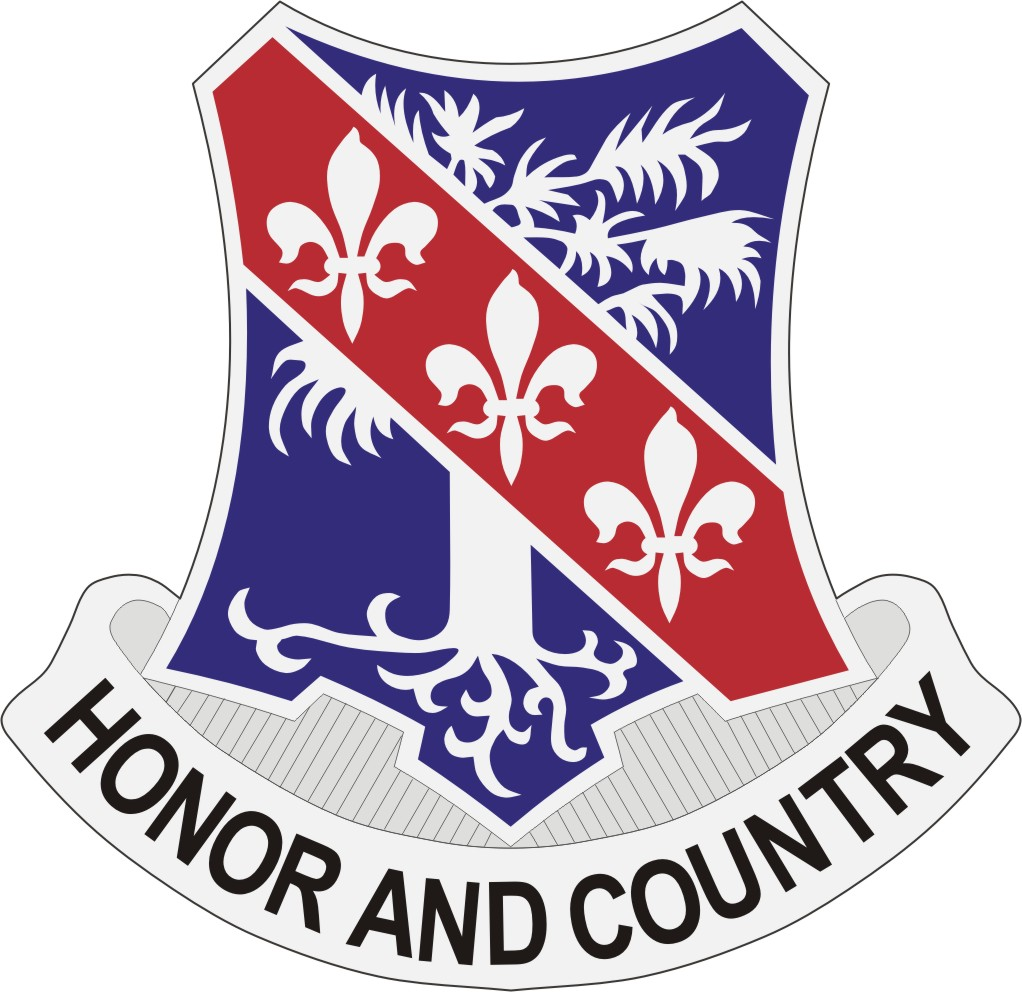
327th Infantry Regiment Distinctive Unit Insignia
5 Overseas Service Bars

Army Distinguished Service Medal
Defense Superior Service Medal with two bronze oak leaf clusters
Legion of Merit with three oak leaf clusters
Bronze Star
Meritorious Service Medal with four oak leaf clusters
Joint Service Commendation Medal
Army Commendation Medal with two oak leaf clusters
Army Achievement Medal with oak leaf cluster
Joint Meritorious Unit Award
Army Meritorious Unit Commendation
National Defense Service Medal with one bronze service star
Southwest Asia Service Medal with one service star
Afghanistan Campaign Medal
Iraq Campaign Medal
Global War on Terrorism Service Medal
Army Service Ribbon
Army Overseas Service Ribbon with bronze award numeral 4
Kuwait Liberation Medal (Saudi Arabia)
Kuwait Liberation Medal (Kuwait)

Military offices
Preceded by LTG John M. Brown III	Commander of the United States Army Pacific; 2008–2010	Succeeded by LTG Francis J. Wiercinski
