= Edwin P. Smith =

US Army general

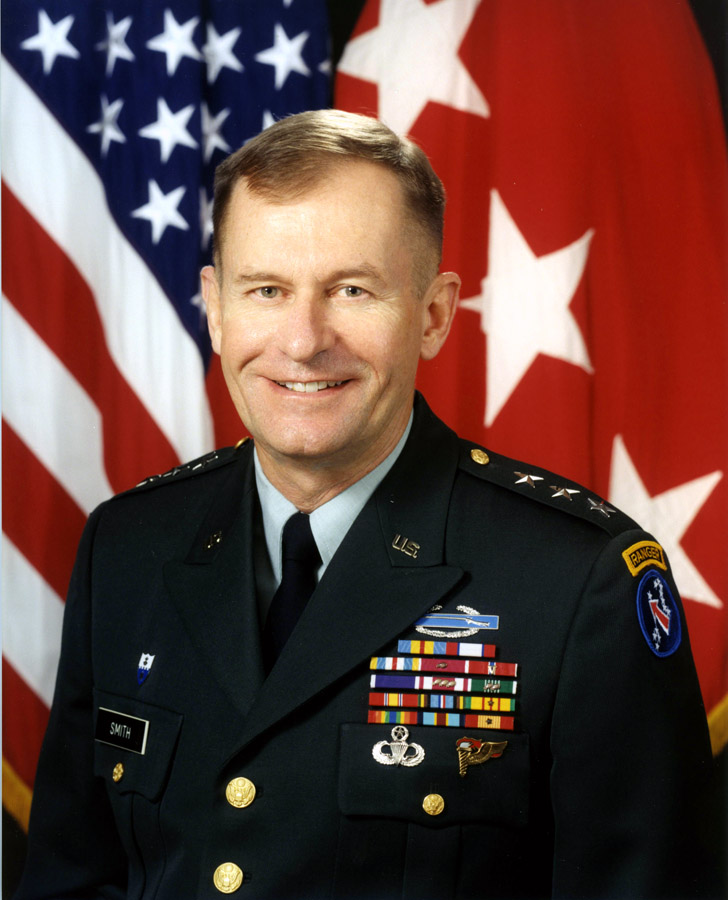
- Lieutenant General Edwin P. Smith
- Born: 8 August 1945 (age 81); Pennsylvania, United States
- Military career
- Allegiance: United States of America
- Branch: United States Army
- Service years: 1967-2003
- Rank: Lieutenant General
- Commands: U.S. Army Pacific
- Conflicts: Vietnam War
- Awards: Defense Distinguished Service Medal; Army Distinguished Service Medal; Defense Superior Service Medal; Legion of Merit (2); Bronze Star with "V" Device; Purple Heart
- Other work: Director, Asia-Pacific Center for Security Studies

Lieutenant General Edwin Paul Smith (born 8 August 1945) commanded the U.S. Army, Pacific from October 1998 to his retirement in November 2002. He graduated from the United States Military Academy in 1967 and went on to earn two graduate degrees. He earned a Master of Arts in English from the University of Kentucky and a Master of Business Administration from Long Island University. Smith is also a graduate of the Canadian National Defense College.

Smith served one tour in Vietnam during 1968 as an infantry platoon leader. Promoted to Brigadier General in 1993, Smith's major command prior to USARPAC was as Commanding General of the U.S. Army Southern European Task Force in Vicenza, Italy. Other major duty assignments were as Deputy for Readiness for the U.S. Pacific Command from 1991–1993. He then served as Executive Officer to the Supreme Allied Commander Europe, in Belgium, followed by a tour as Assistant Division Commander for the 82nd Airborne Division at Fort Bragg.

== Awards and decorations ==
Smith's official retirement date was 1 January 2003. He later served as the Director of Asia-Pacific Center for Security Studies in Honolulu from 2005 until 2011.

- Defense Distinguished Service Medal
- Army Distinguished Service Medal
- Defense Superior Service Medal
- Legion of Merit
- Bronze Star
- Purple Heart
