= Herbert E. Wolff =

United States Army general

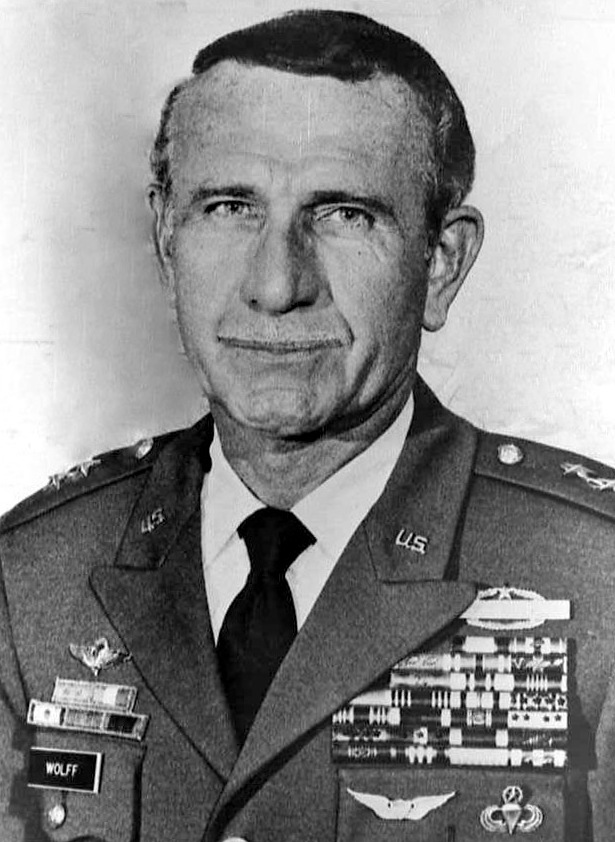
- Born: May 24, 1925; Cologne, Germany
- Died: April 17, 2009 (aged 83); Honolulu, Hawaii, U.S.
- Burial place: National Memorial Cemetery of the Pacific
- Military career
- Allegiance: United States of America
- Branch: United States Army
- Service years: 1943–1981
- Rank: Major General
- Commands: US Army Security Agency, Pacific; Central Security Service; Deputy Commander, V Corps; US Army CINCPAC Support Group and US Army Support Command; US Army Western Command (WESTCOM)
- Conflicts: World War II; Korean War; Vietnam War
- Awards: Distinguished Service Medal (3); Silver Star (2); Legion of Merit (4); Distinguished Flying Cross; Bronze Star Medal (4) with Valor "V"; Combat Infantryman Badge (2)

Herbert E. Wolff (May 24, 1925 – April 17, 2009) was a United States Army Major General.

== Early life and education ==
Wolff was born in Cologne, Germany, on May 24, 1925. Wolff's family fled Nazi Germany in 1939 and moved to the United States.

== Career ==
=== World War II ===
Wolff was drafted into the U.S. Army in 1943. He served in the Pacific Theater. He volunteered to join the Alamo Scouts and participated in the Raid at Cabanatuan. In 1945 he was given a battlefield commission to the rank of Second lieutenant and was awarded the Silver Star.

=== Service after World War II and during the Korean War ===
During the Korean War Wolff saw combat and earned a second Silver Star.

=== 1960s and the Vietnam War ===
Wolff graduated from the Army War College.

Wolff's assignments during this period included the following:

- Commanding Officer, Infantry Training Center, Fort Benning, Georgia (1967-1968)
- Deputy Commanding General, US Army Training Center, Fort Dix, New Jersey (1968-1969)
- Assistant Division Commander, 1st Infantry Division, South Vietnam (1969-1970)
- Commanding General, Capital Military Assistance Command, South Vietnam (1970)

=== 1970s to 1981 ===
Wolff's assignments during this period included the following:

- Commanding General, US Army Security Agency, Pacific, Hawaii (1970-1972)
- Central Security Service, Fort Meade, Maryland (1970-1975)
- Deputy Commander, V Corps, West Germany (1975-1977)
- Commander, US Army CINCPAC Support Group and US Army Support Command, Hawaii (1977)
- Commander, US Army Western Command (WESTCOM) (1979)

Wolff retired from active service in 1981.

== Awards and decorations ==
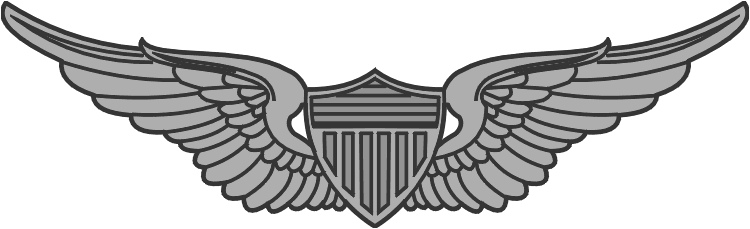
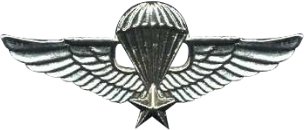
Combat Infantryman Badge (second award)
Basic Army Aviator Badge
Master Parachutist Badge
Army Staff Identification Badge
Vietnamese Parachutist Badge
Unidentified foreign parachutist badge
? Overseas Service Bars

Army Distinguished Service Medal with two bronze oak leaf clusters
Silver Star with oak leaf cluster
Legion of Merit with three oak leaf clusters
Distinguished Flying Cross
Bronze Star with "V" device and three oak leaf clusters
Air Medal with three oak leaf clusters
Joint Service Commendation Medal
Army Commendation Medal
Purple Heart
Army Presidential Unit Citation with two oak leaf clusters
Army Good Conduct Medal
American Campaign Medal
Asiatic–Pacific Campaign Medal with five bronze service stars
World War II Victory Medal
Army of Occupation Medal
National Defense Service Medal with oak leaf clusters
Korean Service Medal with four service stars
Vietnam Service Medal with four service stars
Philippine Liberation Medal with three service stars
National Order of Vietnam, Knight
Vietnam Gallantry Cross with palms and stars
Vietnam Armed Forces Honor Medal, 1st class
Philippine Republic Presidential Unit Citation
Republic of Korea Presidential Unit Citation
Vietnam Gallantry Cross Unit Citation
Vietnam Civil Actions Medal Unit Citation
United Nations Korea Medal
Vietnam Campaign Medal

== Personal life ==
While still on active service in Hawaii, Wolff was instrumental in the preservation of Battery Randolph at Fort DeRussy and the creation of a museum there, founding the nonprofit Hawaii Army Museum Society in 1976 and serving as its president for more than 30 years.

After retiring from the U.S. Army in 1981, Wolff remained in Honolulu, Hawaii. Wolff died on April 17, 2009, in Honolulu, Hawaii, and was buried at National Memorial Cemetery of the Pacific. He was survived by two sons and eight grandchildren.

== External sources ==
- "Together we served" page
