= List of districts of Lampung =

The province of Lampung in Indonesia is divided into regencies which in turn are divided administratively into districts or kecamatan.

== Districts ==
The districts of Lampung, with the regency each falls into, are as follows:

- Abung Barat, Lampung Utara
- Abung Selatan, Lampung Utara
- Abung Semuli, Lampung Utara
- Abung Surakarta, Lampung Utara
- Abung Tengah, Lampung Utara
- Abung Timur, Lampung Utara
- Abung Tinggi, Lampung Utara
- Adi Luwih, Pringsewu
- Anak Tuha, Lampung Tengah
- Bahuga, Way Kanan
- Balik Bukit, Lampung Barat
- Bandar Mataram, Lampung Tengah
- Bandar Sribawono, Lampung Timur
- Bandar Surabaya, Lampung Tengah
- Bangunrejo, Lampung Tengah
- Banjar Agung, Tulang Bawang
- Banjar Baru, Tulang Bawang
- Banjar Margo, Tulang Bawang
- Banjit, Way Kanan
- Baradatu, Way Kanan
- Batanghari Nuban, Lampung Timur
- Batanghari, Lampung Timur
- Batu Brak, Lampung Barat
- Bekri, Lampung Tengah
- Belalau, Lampung Barat
- Bengkunat, Lampung Barat
- Blambangan Umpu, Way Kanan
- Braja Slebah, Lampung Timur
- Buay Bahuga, Way Kanan
- Bukit Kemuning, Lampung Utara
- Bumi Agung, Lampung Timur
- Bumi Agung, Way Kanan
- Bumi Nabung, Lampung Tengah
- Bumi Ratu Nuban, Lampung Tengah
- Bunga Mayang, Lampung Utara
- Candipuro, Lampung Selatan
- Cukuh Balak, Tanggamus
- Dente Teladas, Tulang Bawang
- Gading Rejo, Pringsewu
- Gedong Tataan, Pesawaran
- Gedung Aji Baru, Tulang Bawang
- Gedung Aji, Tulang Bawang
- Gedung Meneng, Tulang Bawang
- Gisting, Tanggamus
- Gunung Agung, Tulang Bawang Barat
- Gunung Labuhan, Way Kanan
- Gunung Pelindung, Lampung Timur
- Gunung Sugih, Lampung Tengah
- Gunung Terang, Tulang Bawang Barat
- Jabung, Lampung Timur
- Jati Agung, Lampung Selatan
- Kalianda, Lampung Selatan
- Kalirejo, Lampung Tengah
- Karya Penggawa, Lampung Barat
- Kasui, Way Kanan
- Katibung, Lampung Selatan
- Kedaton, Bandar Lampung
- Kedondong, Pesawaran
- Kelumbayan, Tanggamus
- Kemiling, Bandar Lampung
- Ketapang, Lampung Selatan
- Ketimbang
- Kota Agung, Tanggamus
- Kota Gajah, Lampung Tengah
- Kotabumi Selatan, Lampung Utara
- Kotabumi Utara, Lampung Utara
- Kotabumi, Lampung Utara
- Labuhan Maringgai, Lampung Timur
- Labuhan Ratu, Lampung Timur
- Lambu Kibang, Tulang Bawang Barat
- Lemong, Lampung Barat
- Margatiga, Lampung Timur
- Marga Sekampung, Lampung Timur
- Mataram Baru, Lampung Timur
- Melinting, Lampung Timur
- Menggala, Tulang Bawang
- Menggala Timur, Tulang Bawang
- Meraksa Aji, Tulang Bawang
- Merbau Mataram, Lampung Selatan
- Mesuji, Mesuji
- Metro Barat, Kota Metro
- Metro Barat, Metro
- Metro Kibang, Lampung Timur
- Metro Pusat, Metro
- Metro Selatan, Metro
- Metro Timur, Metro
- Metro Utara, Metro
- Muara Sungkai, Lampung Utara
- Natar, Lampung Selatan
- Negara Batin, Way Kanan
- Negeri Agung, Way Kanan
- Negeri Besar, Way Kanan
- Negeri Katon, Pesawaran
- Padang Cermin, Pesawaran
- Padang Ratu, Lampung Tengah
- Pagelaran, Pringsewu
- Pakuan Ratu, Way Kanan
- Palas, Lampung Selatan
- Panjang, Bandar Lampung
- Pardasuka, Pringsewu
- Pasir Sakti, Lampung Timur
- Pekalongan, Lampung Timur
- Pematang Sawa, Tanggamus
- Penawar Aji, Tulang Bawang
- Penawar Tama, Tulang Bawang
- Penengahan, Lampung Selatan
- Pesisir Selatan, Lampung Barat
- Pesisir Tengah, Lampung Barat
- Pesisir Utara, Lampung Barat
- Pubian, Lampung Tengah
- Pugung, Tanggamus
- Pulau Panggung, Tanggamus
- Punduh Pidada, Pesawaran
- Punggur, Lampung Tengah
- Purbolinggo, Lampung Timur
- Rajabasa, Bandar Lampung
- Rajabasa, Lampung Selatan
- Raman Utara, Lampung Timur
- Rawajitu Selatan, Tulang Bawang
- Rawajitu Timur, Tulang Bawang
- Rawajitu Utara, Mesuji
- Rebang Tangkas, Way Kanan
- Rumbia, Lampung Tengah
- Sekampung Udik, Lampung Timur
- Sekampung, Lampung Timur
- Sekincau, Lampung Barat
- Selagai Lingga, Lampung Tengah
- Semaka, Tanggamus
- Sendang Agung, Lampung Tengah
- Seputih Agung, Lampung Tengah
- Seputih Banyak, Lampung Tengah
- Seputih Mataram, Lampung Tengah
- Seputih Raman, Lampung Tengah
- Seputih Surabaya, Lampung Tengah
- Sidomulyo, Lampung Selatan
- Simpang Pematang, Mesuji
- Sragi, Lampung Selatan
- Way Halim, Bandar Lampung
- Sukadana, Lampung Timur
- Sukarame, Bandar Lampung
- Sukau, Lampung Barat
- Sukoharjo, Pringsewu
- Sumber Jaya, Lampung Barat
- Sumberejo, Tanggamus
- Sungkai Selatan, Lampung Utara
- Sungkai Utara, Lampung Utara
- Suoh, Lampung Barat
- Talang Padang, Tanggamus
- Tanjung Bintang, Lampung Selatan
- Tanjung Karang Barat, Bandar Lampung
- Tanjung Karang Pusat, Bandar Lampung
- Tanjung Karang Timur, Bandar Lampung
- Tanjung Raja, Lampung Utara
- Tanjung Raya, Mesuji
- Tanjung Senang, Bandar Lampung
- Tanjungsari, Lampung Selatan
- Tegineneng, Pesawaran
- Teluk Betung Barat, Bandar Lampung
- Teluk Betung Selatan, Bandar Lampung
- Teluk Betung Utara, Bandar Lampung
- Terbanggi Besar, Lampung Tengah
- Terusan Nunyai, Lampung Tengah
- Trimurjo, Lampung Tengah
- Tulang Bawang Tengah, Tulang Bawang Barat
- Tulang Bawang Udik, Tulang Bawang Barat
- Tumi Jajar, Tulang Bawang Barat
- Ulubelu, Tanggamus
- Waway Karya, Lampung Timur
- Way Bungur, Lampung Timur
- Way Jepara, Lampung Timur
- Way Kenanga, Tulang Bawang Barat
- Way Lima, Pesawaran
- Way Panji, Lampung Selatan
- Way Pengubuan, Lampung Tengah
- Way Ratai, Pesawaran
- Way Seputih, Lampung Tengah
- Way Serdang, Mesuji
- Way Sulan, Lampung Selatan
- Way Tenong, Lampung Barat
- Way Tuba, Way Kanan
- Wonosobo, Tanggamus
- Air Itam, Lampung Barat
- Gedung Surian, Lampung Barat
- Kebun Tebu, Lampung Barat
- Bandar Negeri Suoh, Lampung Barat
- Pagar Dewa Lampung Barat
- Batu Ketulis, Lampung Barat
- Gedung Surian' Lampung Barat
