= Banjar Agung, Tulang Bawang =

District of Indonesia

Banjar Agung Kecamatan Banjar Agung
- District
- Location of Banjar Agung in Lampung
- Coordinates: 4°17′9.47″S 105°16′25.75″E
- Country: Indonesia
- Province: Lampung
- Regency: Tulang Bawang Regency
- Village: 11

Government
  - District Head: L. Fandhi Ahmad Zia, S.STP, M.Si

Area
  - Total: 230.88 km^{2} (89.14 sq mi)

Population (mid 2022 estimate)
  - Total: 44,290
  - Density: 191.8/km^{2} (496.8/sq mi)
- Time zone: UTC+7 (Indonesia Western Time)
- Postcode: 34682
- Area code: +62 (736)
- Vehicle registration: BE
- Website: banjaragung.tulangbawangkab.go.id

Banjar Agung is a district (kecamatan) located in the Tulang Bawang Regency of Lampung Province in Sumatra, Indonesia.

Banjar Agung District is the district with the fastest growth in Tulang Bawang Regency. Located in the section of the Asian Highway AH25 (Trans-Sumatra Highway) from the City of Bandar Lampung to the City of Palembang. Banjar Agung feels special with its existence as the largest economic and trade center area in Tulang Bawang Regency with its market known as Pasar Unit 2 Banjar Agung.

== Village ==
Banjar Agung is divided into eleven administrative villages, there are shown on table below:

Table of villages with their population in Banjar Agung District
| No | Name of Village | Area (km^{2}) | Sub-villages | Population (mid 2021) |
|---|---|---|---|---|
| 1. | Banjar Agung | 8.48 | 5 | 4,157 |
| 2. | Banjar Dewa | 8.67 | 5 | 2,808 |
| 3. | Dwi Warga Tunggal Jaya | 7.53 | 9 | 10,339 |
| 4. | Moris Jaya | 14.50 | 7 | 4,142 |
| 5. | Tri Dharma Wirajaya | 7.57 | 4 | 2,211 |
| 6. | Tri Mukti Jaya | 8.51 | 4 | 1,577 |
| 7. | Tri Mulya Jaya | 7.52 | 4 | 1,353 |
| 8. | Tri Tunggal Jaya | 12,19 | 5 | 6,952 |
| 9. | Tunggal Warga | 7.57 | 8 | 6,040 |
| 10. | Warga Makmur Jaya | 7.63 | 4 | 3,460 |
| 11. | Warga Indah Jaya | 7.59 | 4 | 961 |
| | Total | 97.73 | 59 | 44,000 |

== Border ==
The district of Banjar Agung is bordered as follows:

| North | Banjar Margo District |
| West | West Tulang Bawang Regency |
| South | Banjar Baru District |
| East | Gedung Aji District |

== List of schools ==
=== Middle schools ===
1. SMP Negeri 1 Banjar Agung
2. SMP Negeri 2 Banjar Agung
3. SMP Negeri 3 Banjar Agung
4. SMP Lentera Harapan
5. SMP IT Cendekia

=== Senior high schools ===
1. SMA Negeri 1 Banjar Agung
2. SMK Negeri 1 Banjar Agung
3. SMK Al-Iman
4. SMK HMPTI
5. SMK Nusantara
6. SMK Kes Bhakti Nusantara
