= Tulang Bawang River =

River in Lampung, Indonesia

Tulang Bawang River Sungai Tulangbawang, Wai Tulangbawang, Wai Toelangbawang, Tolangbawang
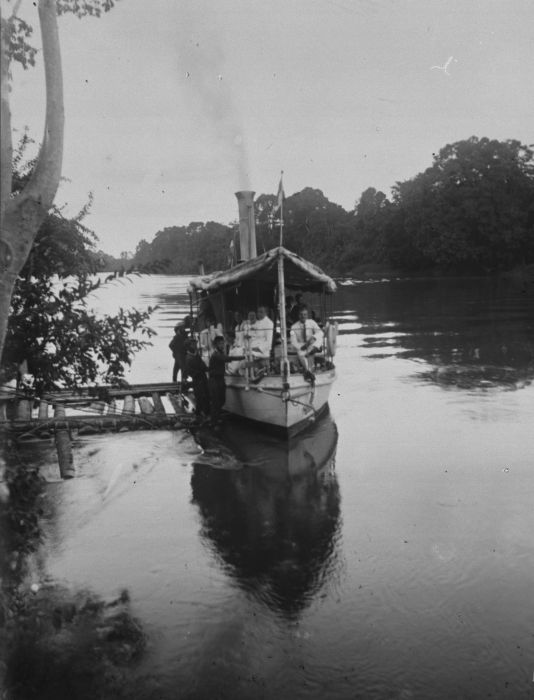
- Tulang Bawang River at Menggala (1922)

- Location of river mouth Tulang Bawang River (Indonesia)
- Native name: Way Tulang Bawang (Lampung Api)

Location
- Country: Indonesia
- Province: Lampung; South Sumatra

Physical characteristics
- Mouth: Java Sea
  - coordinates: 4°24′26″S 105°50′40″E
- Length: 136 km (85 mi)
- Basin size: 10,150 km^{2}
- Discharge
  - location: Near mouth
  - average: (Period: 1971–2000)476.8 m^{3}/s (16,840 cu ft/s)

The Tulang Bawang River (Lampungnese: Way Tulang Bawang) is a river which mostly flows in Lampung, Indonesia. The river lends its name to the Tulang Bawang Regency, where it reaches the Java Sea and the West Tulang Bawang Regency. It also flows across the capital of the regency at Menggala.

One of the largest rivers in the province, it is primarily utilized by locals as a source of irrigation with little use as a waterway.

== History ==
Around the 1750s, the Dutch East India Company (VOC) competed with the British Empire and the more local Palembangese for influence in Lampung, particularly in the pepper trade. Initially they were seen as less desirable to the locals of Tulang Bawang due to their tendency to avoid local conflicts. In 1751 a Dutch post was assaulted and captured by a local prince.

It was not until the mid-1800s when the Dutch East Indies managed to subjugate the locals and established formal administration over the banks. At the turn of the twentieth century, the banks of Tulang Bawang and its tributaries were settled by about 30,000 people, in comparison to the relatively unpopulated regions further away from the rivers. They were mostly inland Abung people living in indigenous houses.

== Geography ==
The river flows in the southeast area of Sumatra with predominantly tropical rainforest climate (designated as Af in the Köppen-Geiger climate classification). The annual average temperature in the area is 25 °C. The warmest month is September, when the average temperature is around 28 °C, and the coldest is January, at 22 °C. The average annual rainfall is 3248 mm. The wettest month is December, with an average of 547 mm rainfall, and the driest is September, with 40 mm rainfall.

== See also ==
- List of drainage basins of Indonesia
- List of rivers of Indonesia
- List of rivers of Sumatra
