= Invasion of Sumatra =

1942 Japanese invasion during World War II

Invasion of Sumatra (1942)
- Part of the Pacific War
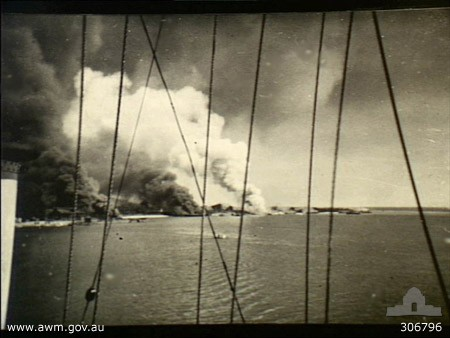
- Port facilities at Oosthaven are destroyed to deny their use by the Japanese, 20 February 1942
Date	14 February – 28 March 1942
Location	Sumatra, Dutch East Indies
Result	Japanese victory

Belligerents
Allies; Netherlands: Dutch East Indies; United Kingdom: Australia; United States	Japan

Commanders and leaders
Middle Sumatra: (Dutch government-in-exile) Maj-Gen. Roelof T. Overakker; West-Sumatra: (Dutch government-in-exile) Lt. Col. John Blogg; North-Sumatra: (Dutch government-in-exile) Col. George Gosenson; Rear-Admiral Karel Doorman	(Empire of Japan) Vice-Admiral Jisaburō Ozawa (Empire of Japan) Rear-Admiral Shintarō Hashimoto (Empire of Japan) Rear-Admiral Kakaji Kakuta (Empire of Japan) Lt-Gen. Tomoyuki Yamashita (Empire of Japan) Lt-Gen. Hitoshi Imamura

The Invasion of Sumatra was the assault by Imperial Japanese forces on the Dutch East Indies that took place from 14 February to 28 March 1942. The invasion was part of the Pacific War in South-East Asia during World War II and led to the capture of the island. The invasion of Sumatra was planned to occur prior to the invasion of Java to destroy the west flank of the Allies and to give access to Java.

== Background ==
After the Japanese successfully conquered the Malay Peninsula, the Allies began to transfer personnel in December 1941 to Sumatra. First British and Australian bombers were moved in relays to the south of the island to recuperate from losses on the Malay peninsula. In addition, a convoy brought about 3,400 Australian soldiers to Sumatra.

In a joint conference on 16 December, the Dutch requested aid to strengthen the defence of Sumatra and Java. Furthermore, plans were made in Sabang to establish Medan and Pekanbaru supply camps. However, these plans were revised on the 27 December, with airfields P1 (Pangkalanbenteng) and P2 (Praboemoelih) near Palembang selected as locations of the new headquarters to station an operational bomber relay. P2 had not been discovered by the Japanese reconnaissance flights up to then. Because of the poor state of the airfields, the relocation began on 31 December; available ground staff arrived at the beginning of January. Another airfield was located in Oosthaven, today's Bandar Lampung. Works on roads were also started in Medan and Pekanbaru. Lack of anti-aircraft guns was remedied with the delivery of six heavy and six light Bofors anti-aircraft guns to each Palembang airfield. Another eight anti-aircraft guns were placed at the refineries. However, there was an ammunition shortage, because the ammunition delivery ships had been sunk by the Japanese during the crossing.

== Operation L ==
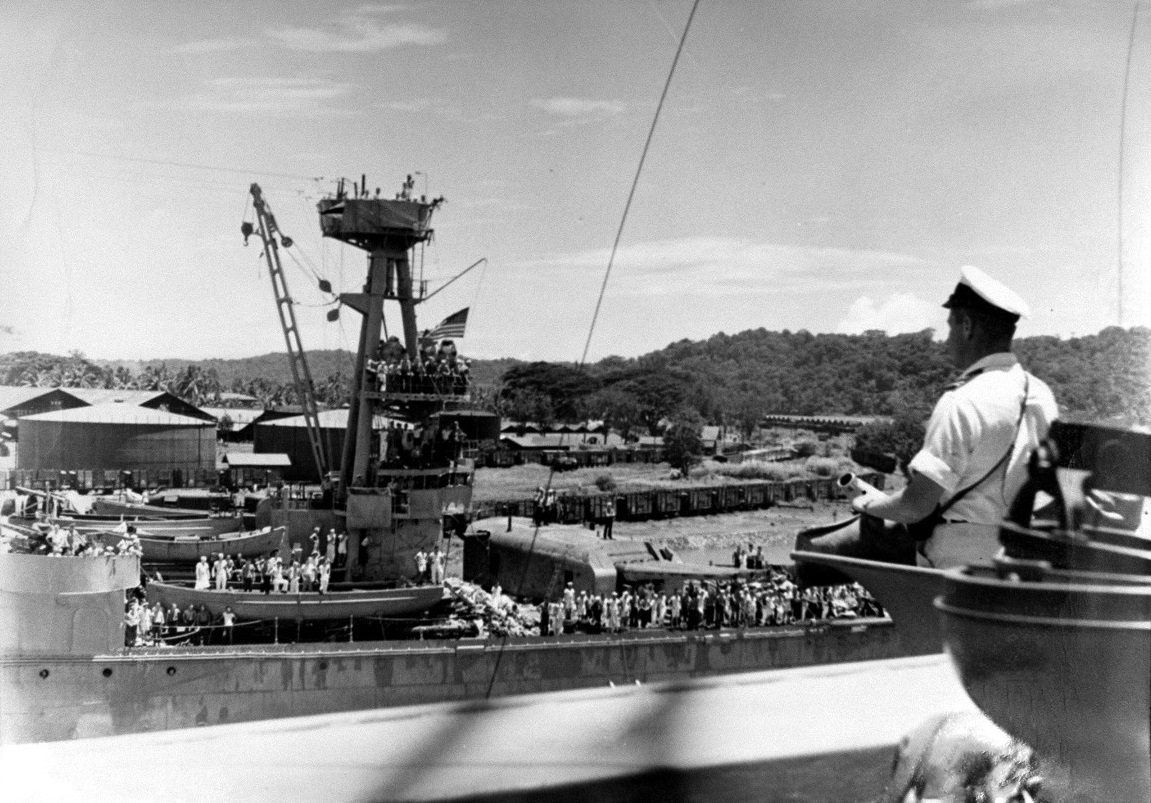
USS Houston (CA-30) at Cilacap flying half-mast after a Japanese air attack in Bangka Strait

The first Japanese air raid came on 6 February and hit the P1 airfield at Palembang. The Allies lost two Blenheim bombers and four Hurricanes. Two other Hurricanes were damaged. On the ground, the Japanese destroyed two Buffalos. During the attack, the Allies shot down only a single Japanese Nakajima Ki-43. As a countermove, the Allies began night raids against the Japanese lines on the Malay peninsula and provided air protection for refugee convoys from Singapore.

For Operation "L", the Japanese army had transported the 229th Infantry Regiment of the 38th Infantry Division from Hong Kong to Cam Ranh Bay in Indo-China. From there, eight transports departed on 9 February 1942, protected by a cruiser, four destroyers, five minesweepers and two submarine hunters under the command of Rear Admiral Shintarō Hashimoto to invade Bangka and Palembang. The next day Rear Admiral Jisaburō Ozawa followed with the Western Covering Fleet, consisting of the flagship cruiser Chōkai with five other cruisers and three destroyers and an Air Group under the command of Rear Admiral Kakaji Kakuta consisting of the aircraft carrier Ryūjō and one destroyer. The bulk of the invasion force followed on 11 February in thirteen transports which were accompanied by a heavy cruiser, a frigate, four destroyers and a submarine hunter.

The Dutch tanker Manvantara was sunk by Japanese aircraft on 13 February 1942 in the Java Sea. Four Dutch submarines lay in wait at the Anambas Islands; however, these could not reach the Japanese fleet. The transports reached Singapore, and subsequently Allied refugee freighters which were on the move in the direction of Java and Sumatra were attacked by Japanese airplanes from the Ryūjō. Apart from that they also damaged the British light cruiser Durban which had to turn away to Colombo. The Japanese attacked repeatedly with airplanes from the Ryūjō and with land-based bombers from the Genzan aerial unit. Two Allied tankers, a steamboat and many smaller vessels were sunk, another tanker and two transports severely damaged.

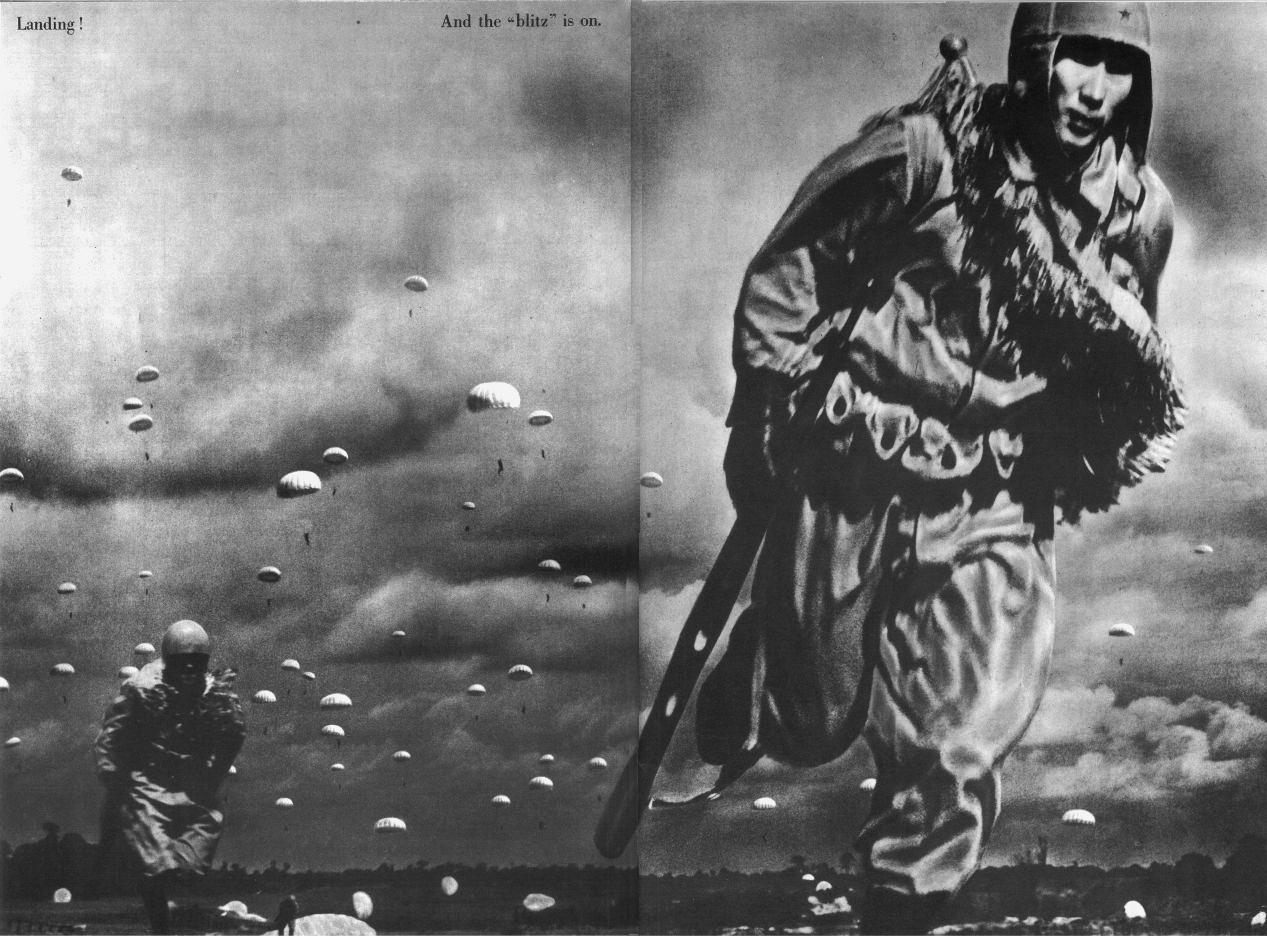
Paratroopers of the Imperial Japanese Army Air Service (IJAAS), Teishin Shudan, descend upon Palembang during the Battle of Palembang, 13‒15 February 1942.

At 8 o'clock in the morning on 14 February the air-raid wardens warned Palembang of a big Japanese attack wave which was in flight to the town. All available Allied air forces were at that time on missions to protect the sea convoys and were not in radio reach. Firstly, a wave of Japanese bombers dropped its load on airfield P1, followed by strafing from accompanying fighters. Shortly afterwards, 260 Japanese paratroopers of the First Japanese Airborne Division landed at P1. They came from the captured airfield of Kahang in Malaya. The second wave consisting of 100 paratroopers from Kluang landed shortly afterwards some kilometres to the west of P1 near the refinery.

In defence were only 150 British anti-aircraft men, 110 Dutch soldiers and 75 British ground defence men at P1. While the Japanese piled up vehicles to make road blocks small gun battles broke out with the defenders and some landed airplanes succeeded in refuelling. The airplanes immediately flew to the undiscovered airfield, P2. The headquarters also moved to P2 after news from the refinery and from Palembang arrived. In the afternoon it came to a deadlock. The British still held the airfield, but, their ammunition was short and they were hindered by the street blockade. After a false report of other Japanese parachute landings at about 25 kilometres of distance spread the British commander, H. G. Maguire, decided to evacuate the airfield and the town. On the next day another 100 Japanese landed at the refinery. After a violent fight which continued the whole day, the defenders forced back the Japanese, but the refinery was heavily damaged by machine gun fire and was aflame. Other surrounding smaller facilities had been damaged.

Meanwhile, the escort fleet had sortied under Vice Admiral Ozawa to the north of Bangka to form a far-reaching cover screen for the Japanese landings which took place shortly afterward. A vanguard went ashore on Bangka, while the main units had landed near Palembang at the mouth of the Musi river and advanced on along the river to the town. A defence at the mouth had not been put up by the Dutch because it was judged by them as useless against the artillery fire expected from the ships.

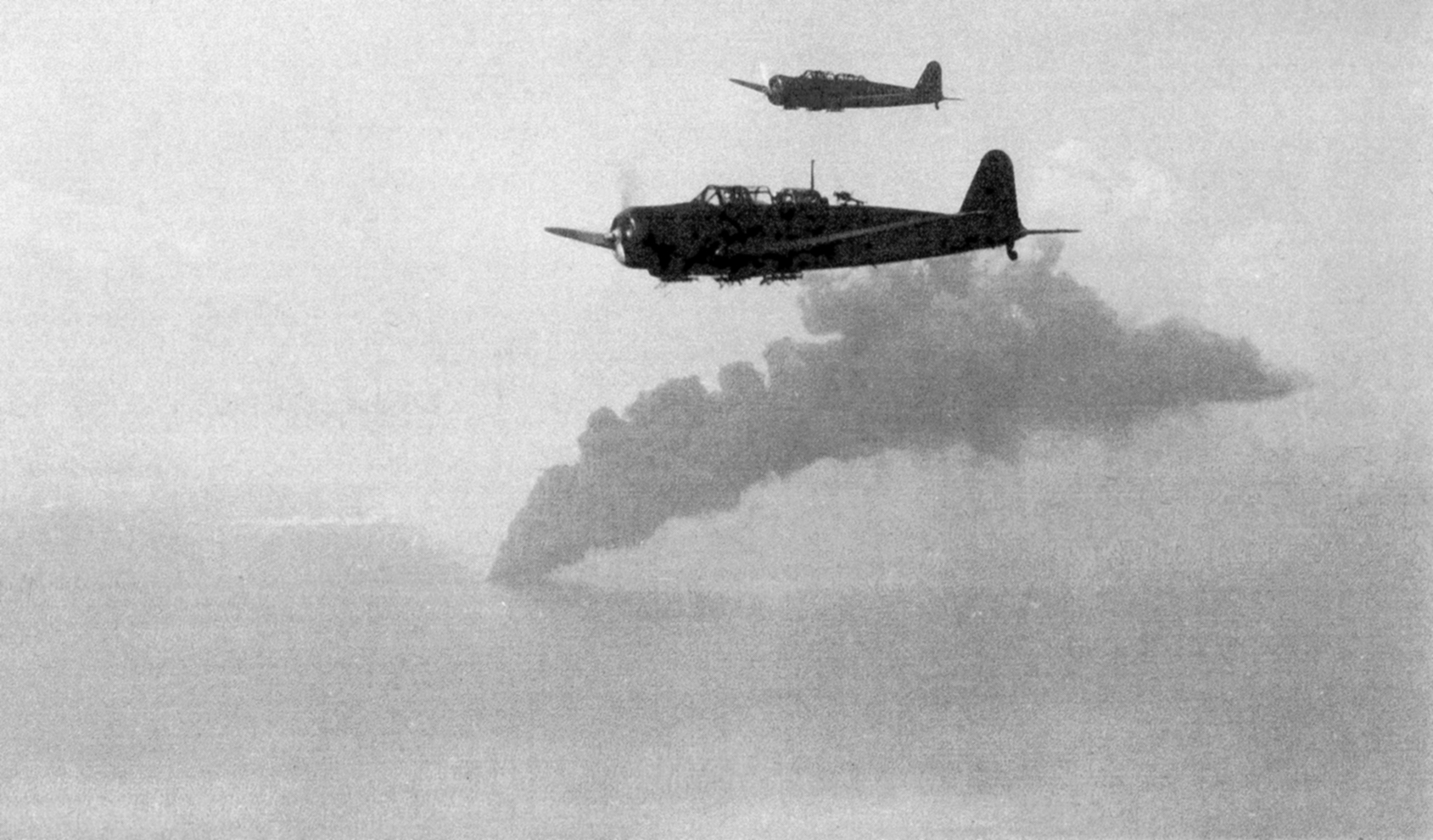
Two Japanese Nakajima B5N torpedo bombers over the Java Sea on 17 February 1942. The smoke in the background is coming from the sinking Dutch destroyer HrMs Van Nes.

At this time Japanese reconnaissance planes sighted the ABDA fleet, under Rear Admiral Karel Doorman, at Gasperstrasse, aka Gaspar Strait, on a northerly course. On Wavell's order, Doorman had collected the fleet, consisting of the Dutch cruisers De Ruyter, Java and Tromp, as well as the British cruiser Exeter and the Australian light cruiser Hobart along with nine destroyers and rendezvoused in Lampung Bay, South Sumatra. They sortied from there on 14 February hoping to intercept the Japanese invasion fleet north of Bangka Island after first having passed through the Gaspar Strait. Japanese aircraft off the Ryūjō, and then land based bombers from Malaya, began attacking the ABDA fleet about midday of the next day, and continued their attacks throughout the afternoon, which subsequently made Doorman pull back all his ships to the south before ever sighting the Japanese invasion fleet.

The invasion fleet in the Bangka Strait had also been spotted by British reconnaissance planes from P2. In the early morning 22 Hurricanes, 35 Blenheims and three Hudsons, tried to attack the ships. Nevertheless, they were engaged by Japanese airplanes in violent aerial battles. At P2 the news of the Japanese parachute landing at P1 became known. The commander initiated the preparations for an evacuation of the airfield. Then, however, the later arriving news that P1 had not been given up yet led to the returned machines being prepared at night for a new attack. In the morning fog the Allied fighter aircraft made violent attacks against the Japanese who had just begun their landing at the mouth of the Musi. Japanese airplanes withdrew shortly after the battle began, so that the Allies succeeded in getting direct hits on the transporters. Twenty landing craft were sunk and, besides, hundreds of Japanese were killed. The last Allied results achieved were by Hurricanes attacking unprotected landing craft on the southwest beach of Bangka.

Meanwhile, the Dutch command had sent the order for the destruction of the oil dumps and rubber dumps. The ferries on the Musi should be destroyed within the next hour so they could not be used by the Japanese. Also the defenders of P1 were to start a quick retreat. On the night of 15 February Japanese units, which had survived the air raid at the Musi mouth, reached Palembang and relieved the paratroopers landed at P1 and the refinery.

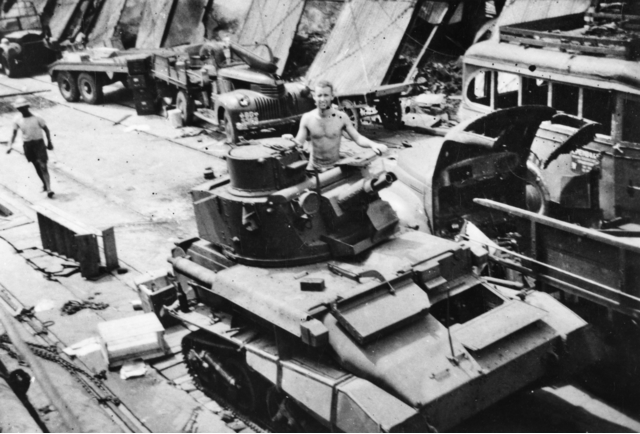
A Light tank MkV1B from a Light Tank Squadron of the 3rd Hussars, British Army, on the wharf. Tasked on defending a port, covering the evacuation of the troops and civilians on the southern tip of Sumatra (17 February 1942)

Field Marshal Archibald Percival Wavell was the Supreme Commander of ABDA. In the morning of 15 February Wavell arranged a regular retreat to the embarkation of his troops at Oosthaven where several small ships lay in the harbour. There 2,500 British RAF members, 1,890 British infantrymen, 700 Dutch soldiers and about 1,000 civilians were evacuated by means of twelve ships on 17 February. The Australian corvette Burnie covered the retreat and destroyed harbour facilities and oil tanks. A smaller steamboat lay at anchor a little while longer in the harbour to be able to take up later arriving refugees.

In the interim the Japanese had completely taken Palembang and had destroyed the oil refineries at two smaller stations. Small troop transporters steamed up the river to Menggala.

All remaining airworthy Allied fighter aircraft were flown out on 16 February. The staff of the airfields proceeded by sea to India. Because the Japanese did not advance for the time being to Oosthaven, a task force went ashore there once again on 20 February to save airplane spare parts as well as to destroy the other usable facilities.

On the 24 February the Japanese reached Gelumbang.

== Operation T ==
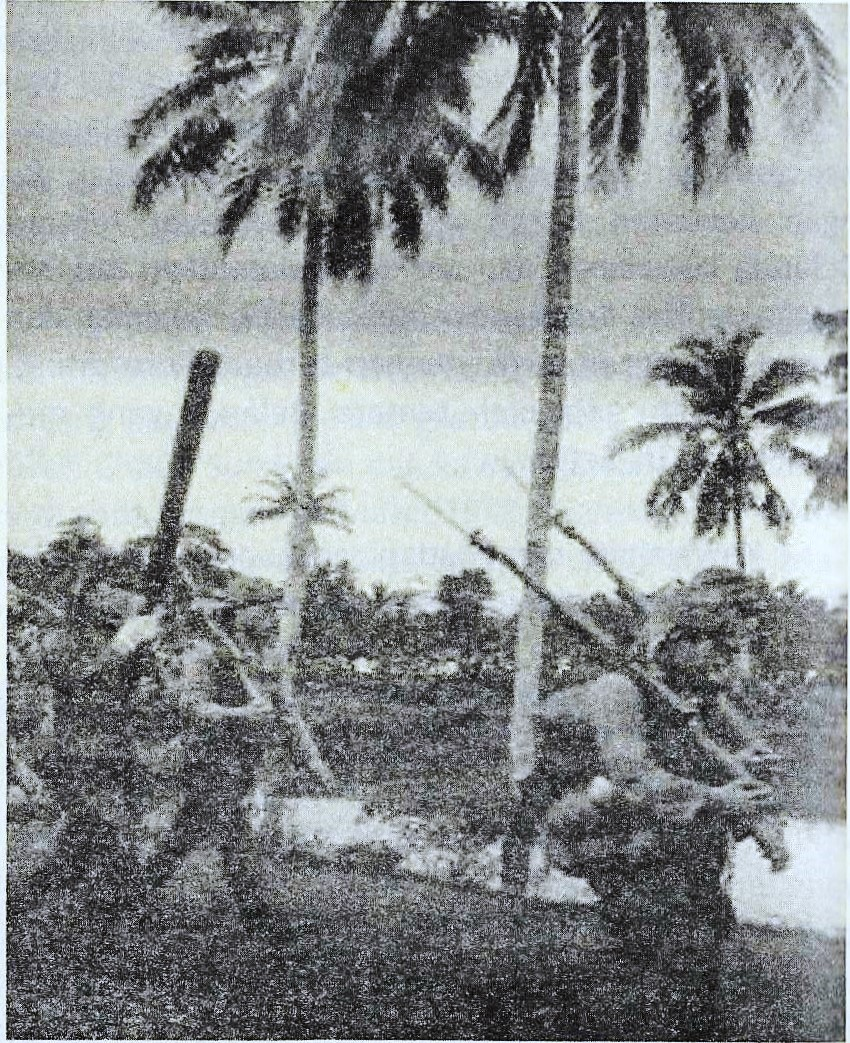
Arrival of the Japanese Imperial Army in West Sumatra (1942)

The Allied units remaining on Sumatra, primarily from the Royal Netherlands East Indies Army (KNIL), withdrew into the middle and northern provinces of the island. The Dutch planned a reconquest of Palembang from there and the expulsion of the Japanese from the island. This was frustrated by an aggressive Japanese pursuit from Palembang with a motorized reconnaissance regiment of approximately 750 men. The outnumbered and retreating forces under Major C.F. Hazenberg numbered only about 350 KNIL regulars in two companies. They were also badly dispersed and could only fight delaying actions, which allowed the better trained and equipped Japanese to rapidly advance. After three weeks, the Japanese were finally contained at Moearatebo on March 2. Dutch reinforcements from Padangpandjang were able to move up when heavy rains made the rivers all but impassable by running 27 feet over their flood gauges. This delay gave local KNIL commanders time to deploy additional units from the middle provinces, thus preventing the retreating units’ flank from being turned.

March 3–7 saw vicious firefights as Japanese units tried to cross the river. As the offensive ground to a halt, Dutch spies returned with reports of many dead and wounded. They also reported that the regiment now numbered only about 200 men. Buoyed by the reports, Major Hazenberg decided to counterattack on the night of March 8–9. On the 7-8th, several native boats were assembled out of sight and loaded with supplies and ammunition while assault groups formed. However, on 8 March the news of the capitulation of Java arrived, all offensive efforts had to be broken off because Sumatra was dependent on supply deliveries from Java and it was decided to take a defensive course. West Sumatra had to be left to the Japanese and only a small part of the north would be held with the available forces as long as possible, until a sea evacuation could be organised.

In the retreat the KNIL units destroyed all airfields and harbour facilities. They withdrew into defensive positions at the south entrance of the Alice (Alas) valley where they planned to detain the Japanese as long as possible. Should the positions fall, a guerrilla war from the environs was planned. Indeed, it would turn out to be difficult because the population of Sumatra did not cooperate with the Dutch, as a long-standing colonial power, but on the contrary would betray to the Japanese the Dutch positions. This was especially clear when the Dutch wanted to move about 3,000 Europeans and Christian civilians in refugee camps from the coast of Aceh province. A Muslim uprising which broke out shortly after the beginning of the Japanese landings prevented the action.

Operation T began on 28 February when 27 transports with 22,000 soldiers of the Imperial Guard aboard sailed from Singapore. They were split in four convoys and were accompanied by three cruisers, ten destroyers, patrol boats and submarine-defensive units. Because the allied air defence and sea defence was non-existent at that time, they reached north Sumatra absolutely unchecked.

On 12 March the Kobayashi Detachment took Sabang Island and the airfield at Koetaradja without running into opposition. Yoshida Detachment had landed south of Idi with a single infantry battalion with orders to seize the Lantja and Pangkalan Brandan oilfields. It would then drive south towards Medan and apply pressure on Dutch positions there. The main force landed about four miles northwest of Tandjoengtiram. It was to drive along the Pematang Siantar-Balige-Taroetoeng Highway and cut off any KNIL forces attempting to withdraw from Medan and also to drive north to Medan and seize the airfield there.

Sumatra fell on 28 March when the Dutch Major General R. T. Overakker with 2,000 soldiers surrendered near the town of Kutatjane in North Sumatra. Many Allied prisoners were forced by the Japanese to construct a railroad line between Pekanbaru and Moera. (Overakker together with other officers of the KNIL in captivity were shot in 1945 in view of the impending defeat of the Japanese.)

== See also ==
- Japanese occupation of West Sumatra
