= Menggala =

- Subdistrict/Town
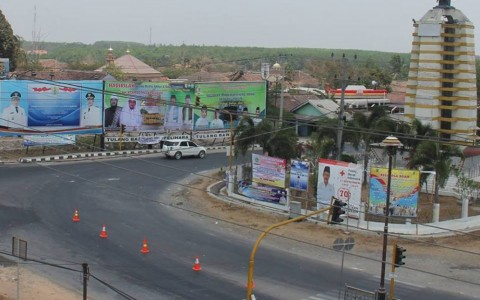
- Streets of Menggala

- Location of Menggala in Lampung
- Coordinates: 4°28′30″S 105°14′29″E
- Country: Indonesia
- Province: Lampung
- Regency: Tulang Bawang Regency

Area
  - Total: 344 km^{2} (133 sq mi)

Population (mid 2022 estimate)
  - Total: 51,574
- Time zone: UTC+7 (WIB)
- Postcode: 34611-34614
- Area code: +62 726

Menggala is a subdistrict and a town in Tulang Bawang Regency, at the southeastern portion of Sumatra. It is the seat of the regency, with a population of about 51,574 in mid 2022. Menggala administratively covers an area of 344 square kilometers. The town's current administrative situation, as a kecamatan or a district of the Lampung province, was established in 1946. It is about 100 km away from the city of Bandar Lampung.

Menggala is one of the oldest towns in the province, with records dating back to the fifth century. Sitting on the right bank of the Tulang Bawang River, one of the primary rivers in Lampung, Menggala was for a long time an important port for the region until the nineteenth century when it was eclipsed by Telukbetung. Before and during the colonial era, the town served as an entrepôt for the pepper trade.

== Geography ==
Menggala is located on the right bank (south side) of the Tulang Bawang River, around 200 kilometers from its mouth and 97 km away from the provincial capital at Bandar Lampung. The Menggala District covers an area of 344 square kilometers and is administratively further divided into nine villages.

=== Climate ===
As with the rest of Indonesia, Menggala has a tropical climate classified as Af in the Köppen climate classification with an average temperature of 25.6 °C (78.1 °F) and precipitation of 2653 mm annually.

Climate data for Menggala, Indonesia
Month	Jan	Feb	Mar	Apr	May	Jun	Jul	Aug	Sep	Oct	Nov	Dec	Year
Mean daily maximum °C (°F)	29.2 (84.6)	29.9 (85.8)	30.4 (86.7)	30.8 (87.4)	30.7 (87.3)	30.4 (86.7)	30 (86)	30.1 (86.2)	30.2 (86.4)	30.7 (87.3)	30.6 (87.1)	29.9 (85.8)	30.2 (86.4)
Mean daily minimum °C (°F)	21.1 (70.0)	21 (70)	21.3 (70.3)	21.4 (70.5)	21.2 (70.2)	20.7 (69.3)	20.5 (68.9)	20.5 (68.9)	20.8 (69.4)	21.1 (70.0)	21.3 (70.3)	21.3 (70.3)	21.0 (69.8)
Average precipitation mm (inches)	236 (9.3)	237 (9.3)	228 (9.0)	213 (8.4)	169 (6.7)	133 (5.2)	140 (5.5)	201 (7.9)	227 (8.9)	328 (12.9)	271 (10.7)	270 (10.6)	2,653 (104.4)
Source: climate-data.org

== History ==
Menggala is one of the oldest settlements in Lampung. A polity in the territory that today constitutes Tulang Bawang Regency has been recorded in Chinese sources as early as the fifth century, when a location referred to as Pohuang (Dolang Pohuang in some sources) sent seven missions there. The Buddhist monk Yijing took note of the region during his voyage and time in Palembang at the coast. As with most of southern Sumatra, Menggala was under Srivijayan influence during the empire's peak. According to local folklore, Menggala had been a trading center upstream the Tulang Bawang River for merchants coming from various regions in the Maritime Silk Road such as Canton, Gujarat and Persia, with a tale recording an incident when a hostile Chinese fleet was destroyed by the local armies. Menak Ngegulung Sakti and Menak Sengaji, the two commanders, became folk heroes.

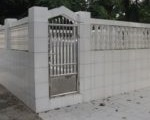
Minak Ngegulung's tomb in Menggala

Tome Pires was one of the first Europeans to take record of the area, and recorded Tulang Bawang in his Suma Oriental as part of the land of Sekampung, mentioning its trade with Sunda. Despite a lack of decisive physical evidence, the center of Tulang Bawang was estimated to be about 20 km away from modern Menggala by Dutch historian J.W. Naarding. As Islam spread across Nusantara, the area remained an important center of trade, and later traded also with the Banten Sultanate which took control of it around 1530. Pepper was produced in the area, which drew the spice-seeking VOC. The Dutch newcomers established a fortress in the area around 1668, making their first foothold in what is today Lampung. These powers, in addition to that of the Palembang Sultanate had significant influences in the region.

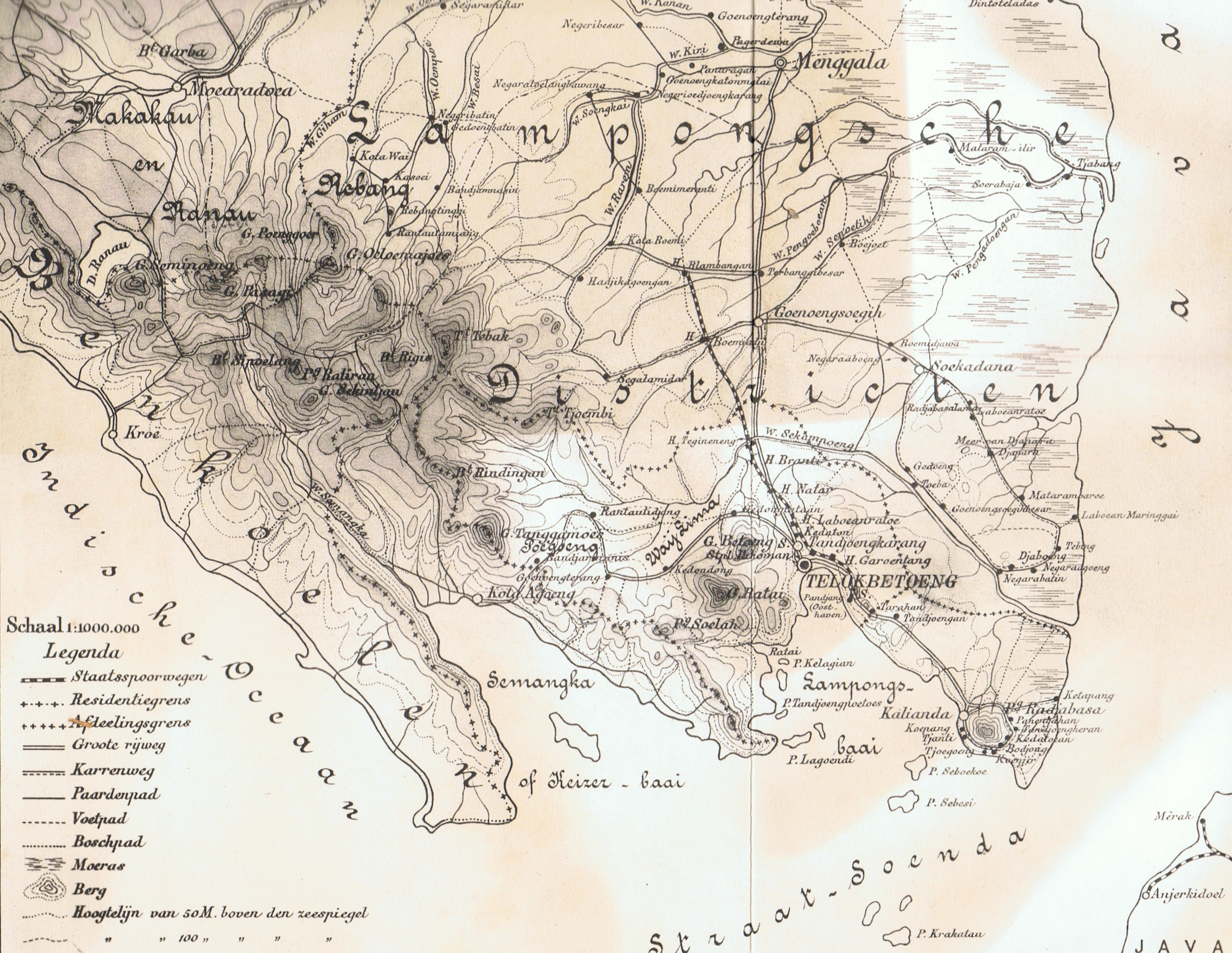
Menggala (top center, slightly to the right) in Lampung Residency.

Following the annexation of Lampung by Herman Willem Daendels in 1808, Menggala remained a busy inland trading port, with a shipping company being established there. Hajj from Palembang would act as middlemen in the pepper trade, trading in both local produce and imported merchandise through mainly sailing ships and native sailboats. The pepper would then be shipped abroad or moved to Telukbetung (today Bandar Lampung) first. This trading activity gave Menggala a nickname Paris van Lampung. However, following the construction of a railroad in which Telukbetung acted as its southern terminus, Menggala's importance diminished. By the early twentieth century, Menggala was described as being a ghost town, although it had a population of 14,000 by 1930 (8 of which are Europeans) compared to 8,976 in 1912. Menggala's Great Mosque of Kibang, the oldest mosque in Lampung, was rebuilt in 1830 following its demolishing due to a redesign of the town. As part of the Lampung Residency, Menggala was made a capital of Tulang Bawang Afdeeling in 1857.

During the Second World War, the Imperial Japanese Army took over the town as part of the larger campaign in Sumatra which involved an invasion of oil-rich Palembang. Following the independence of Indonesia, Menggala became capital of Tulang Bawang although its initial clan-based (marga) administration remained until 1952 when it was replaced by a more secular administration, titled kepala negeri. The modern position of Camat/subdistrict chief was put into place in 1972.

== Demographics ==
Religions in Menggala according to Statistics Indonesia
Islam	93.98%
Hinduism	3.40%
Christian	2.14%
Buddhism	0.48%

According to Statistics Indonesia estimates, the subdistrict has a population of 49,767 in 12,568 households with a sex ratio of 101.1 and an overall population density of 144.7/km^{2}. Islam is the majority religion comprising 93.9% of the population, followed by Hinduism at about 3.4%.

The population is administered by the following villages (desa/kelurahan):

Village	Population	Area
Bujung Tenuk	3,260	26.76
Astra Ksetra	2,327	11.82
Ujung Gunung Ilir	4,756	11.07
Menggala Selatan	10,243	51.79
Ujung Gunung	9,353	95.43
Menggala Tengah	6,367	65.08
Menggala Kota	7,065	44.76
Kagungan Rahayu	4,067	12.47
Tiuh Tohou	2,329	24.81

== Economy and facilities ==
Historically, Menggala has served as a center of trade for agricultural products, allowing their shipping down the Tulang Bawang River. Today, Menggala is connected by the eastern part of the Trans-Sumatran Highway, and is in the route of the Trans-Sumatra Toll Road - which opened its Menggala exit in June 2019.

Important agricultural commodities include palm oil, natural rubber, cassava, coffee, pepper and sugarcane. Menggala is home to sugar refineries and a rubber processing plant established in 2013 with a capacity of 72,000 tons annually.

PLN is largely present and serves 92.3% of the households, with 14 non-electrified households. A single public regional hospital (RSUD) is also present. Throughout the subdistrict, there are 8 high schools, 11 middle schools and 22 elementary schools.

== See also ==
- Subdistricts of Lampung
- Invasion of Sumatra (1942)
