= Tulang Bawang Regency =

Regency in Lampung, Indonesia

Tulang Bawang Regency Kabupaten Tulang Bawang
- Regency
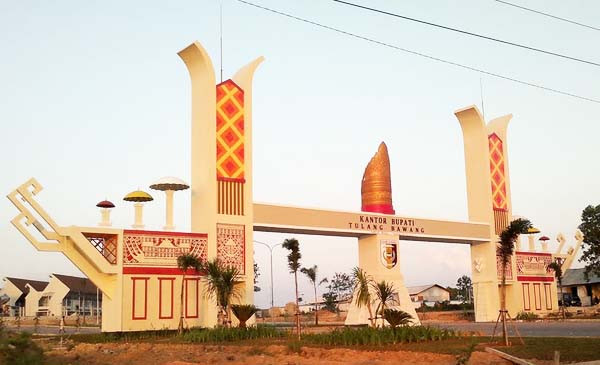
- Regent office of Tulang Bawang in Menggala

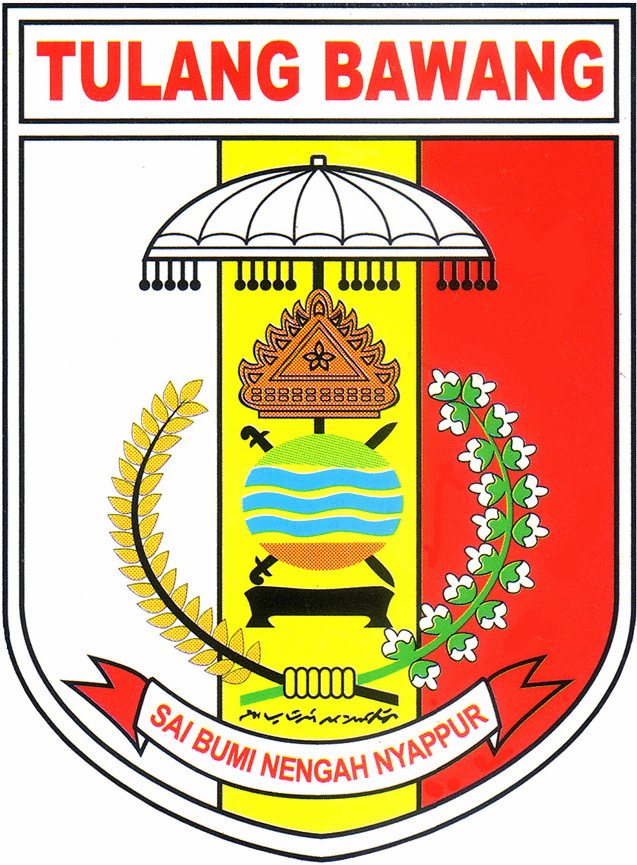
- Coat of arms
- Motto: Sai Bumi Nengah Nyappur (English: one land, friendly getting along)
- Location within Lampung

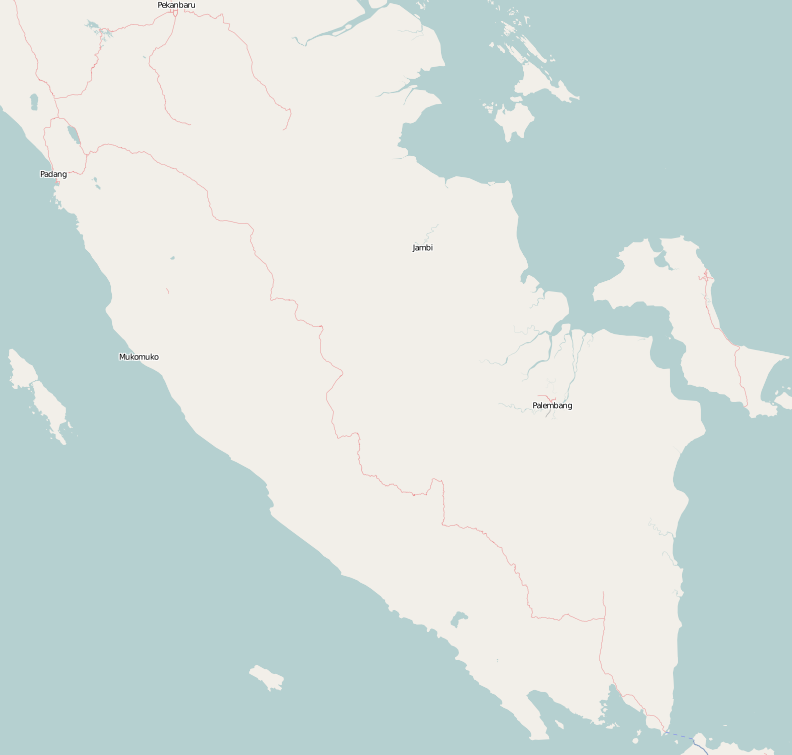
- Location in Southern Sumatra, Sumatra and Indonesia Tulang Bawang Regency (Sumatra) Tulang Bawang Regency (Indonesia)
- Coordinates: 4.3176618°S 105.5005569°E
- Country: Indonesia
- Province: Lampung
- Established: 20 March 1997
- Regency seat: Menggala

Government
  - Regent: Qudrotul Ikhwan
  - Vice Regent: Hankam Hasan

Area
  - Total: 3,466.32 km^{2} (1,338.35 sq mi)

Population (mid 2025 estimate)
  - Total: 442,320
  - Density: 127.61/km^{2} (330.50/sq mi)

Human Development Index (2022)
  - HDI (2022): ▲69,53 Medium
- Time zone: UTC+7 (IWST)
- Postcode: 345xx and 346xx
- Area code: (+62) 736
- Vehicle registration: BE xxxx S**/T*
- Website: tulangbawangkab.go.id

Tulang Bawang Regency is a regency (kabupaten) of Lampung Province, Sumatra, Indonesia. The regency was created on 3 January 1997 from the eastern half of North Lampung Regency; when created, it originally covered a much wider area, but on 29 October 2008 the seven northern districts were separated off to form a new Mesuji Regency, and the eight western districts were also separated off to form a new West Tulang Bawang Regency. It now has an area of 3,466.32 square kilometres (1,338.35 mi^{2}) and had a population of 397,906 at the 2010 Census and 430,021 at the 2020 Census; the official estimate as of mid 2025 was 442,320 (comprising 228,675 males and 213,645 females). The regency seat is the town of Menggala, located about 120 kilometres (75 mi) from the provincial capital of Bandar Lampung. The regency takes its name from the Tulang Bawang River which flows through the province.

== Administrative districts ==
The Regency comprises fifteen districts (kecamatan) which are listed below with their areas and their populations at the 2010 Census and the 2020 Census, together with the official estimates as of mid 2025. The table also includes the locations of the district administrative centres, the number of administrative villages in each district (a total of 147 rural desa and 4 urban kelurahan - the latter all in Menggala District), and its post code.

Kode Wilayah	Name of District (kecamatan)	Area in km^{2}	Pop'n 2010 Census	Pop'n 2020 Census	Pop'n mid 2025 Estimate	Admin centre	No. of villages	Post code
18.05.08	Banjar Agung	230.88	35,349	43,929	46,268	Banjar Agung	11	34682
18.05.20	Banjar Margo	132.95	36,614	40,081	43,150	Agung Dalem	12	34684
18.05.29	Banjar Baru	132.95	13,012	15,080	16,199	Kehuripan Jaya	10	34685
18.05.06	Gedung Aji	114.47	12,023	14,507	15,000	Gedung Ali	10	34681
18.05.23	Penawar Aji	104.45	16,988	20,707	21,978	Gedung Rejo Sakti	9	34592
18.05.26	Meraksa Aji	94.71	12,894	15,543	16,480	Paduan Rajawali	8	34680
18.05.02	Menggala	344.00	41,109	50,919	53,170	Ujung Gunung	9	34611: 34614
18.05.13	Penawar Tama	210.53	25,791	30,584	33,552	Bogatama	14	34593
18.05.12	Rawajitu Selatan (South Rawajitu)	123.94	30,756	31,363	32,627	Medasari	9	34591
18.05.11	Gedung Meneng	657.07	37,024	35,625	31,701	Gedung Meneng	11	34597
18.05.18	Rawa Jitu Timur (East Rawajitu)	176.65	28,854	16,795	14,820	Bumi Dipasena Jaya	8	34590
18.05.22	Rawa Pitu	169.18	15,883	18,114	18,898	Batang Hari	9	34594
18.05.27	Gedung Aji Baru	95.36	20,730	24,647	26,329	Sidomukti	9	34595
18.05.25	Dente Teladas	685.65	59,066	56,458	56,289	Teladas	12	34596
18.05.30	Menggala Timur (East Menggala)	193.53	11,813	15,669	15,859	Lebuh Dalem	10	34615: 34619
	Totals	3,466.32	397,906	430,021	442,320	Menggala	151	

== History ==
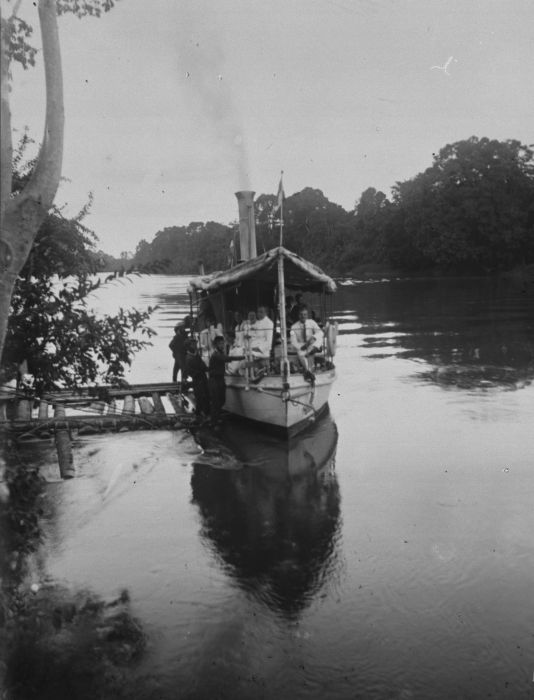
Tulang Bawang River near Menggala, c. 1920s

Early Islamization of Lampung from the 13th century from Pasai is evidenced by the tombstone of Malik Al Saleh written in 1297 and the Batu Brak Site at Hanibung in 688 Hijriyah. Islam was brought by the four sons of Sultan Ratu Ngegalang Paksi. The arrival of the four pious people is a setback from the Sekala Brak kuno with the last king, queen sekekhummong (Sekerummong), the Buay Tumi tribe, who is Hindu Birawa and animist. This momentum is at the same time a milestone in the establishment of Kepaksian Paksi Pak Sekala Brak or Kepaksian Sekala Brak which is based on Islamic religious values. The four sons of Umpu Ratu Ngegalang Paksi are Sultan Ratu Buay Pernong, Umpu Nyerupa, Umpu Belunguh, Umpu Bejalan Diway. The spread of Islam throughout the land of Lampung from the 15th century started from West Lampung Regency. In 1525 Islam also entered through Labuhan Maringgai from Banten and Palembang. The entry of Islam in Tulang Bawang since the 16th century from the village of Pagar the god of the Penggala Tulang Bawang area was brought Islamic traders.

The spread of the Lampung tribe began in the 13th century AD following the marriage of the only daughter Queen sekekhummong, namely Sindi La Lalula in Islam, with the descendants of Kepaksian Pernong who settled in Batu Brak, together with Putri Indar Wati (Sibulan), who opened a new village in the area of Tulang Bawang Regency.

Tulang Bawang Regency was inaugurated by the Minister of Home Affairs on 20 March 1997, as a follow-up to Law no. 2 of 1997 which had provided for the establishment of both the Tulang Bawang Regency and the Tanggamus Regency.

=== Economy ===
Major crops include rice, orange (a growing sector), corn, cassava, soy bean and zallaca palm fruit. As of 2010, the area under plantation in the regency is 298.943 hectares (738.70 acres), mainly rubber, coconut, oil palm and sugar cane. It is particularly known though for its shrimp industry.
