= East Rawajitu, Tulang Bawang =

District of Indonesia

Coordinates: 4.2500°S 105.7908°E

East Rawajitu District (Kecamatan Rawajitu Timur)
- District
- Interactive map of East Rawajitu District
- Country: Indonesia
- Province: Lampung
- Regency: Tulang Bawang Regency
- District: East Rawajitu (Rawajitu Timur)

Government
  - District Head: -

Area
  - Total: 176.65 km^{2} (68.20 sq mi)

Population (mid 2022 Estimate)
  - Total: 15,094
- Time zone: UTC+7 (Indonesia Western Time)
- Vehicle registration: BE
- Website: rawajitutimur.tulangbawangkab.go.id

East Rawajitu (Indonesian: Rawajitu Timur) is a district located in the Tulang Bawang Regency of Lampung Province in Sumatra, Indonesia.

== Borders ==
The district of East Rawajitu is bordered as follows:

- North - South Sumatra Province
- East - the Java Sea
- South - East Lampung Regency
- West - Dente Teladas and South Rawajitu Districts (of Tulang Bawang Regency), and North Rawajitu District (of Mesuji Regency)
