= Banjar Baru, Tulang Bawang =

District of Indonesia

Banjar Baru
- District
- Location in Lampung
- Coordinates: 4.3317°S 105.3014°E
- Country: Indonesia
- Province: Lampung
- Regency: Tulang Bawang Regency
- Village: 10

Area
  - Total: 132.95 km^{2} (51.33 sq mi)

Population (mid 2022 estimate)
  - Total: 15,608
  - Density: 117.40/km^{2} (304.06/sq mi)
- Time zone: UTC+7 (Indonesia Western Time)
- Vehicle registration: BE
- Website: banjarbaru.tulangbawangkab.go.id

Banjar Baru is a district (kecamatan) located in the Tulang Bawang Regency of Lampung Province in Sumatra, Indonesia.

== Border ==
Banjar Baru is bordered by Banjar Agung District to the North, Menggala District to the South, Gedung Aji District to the East and West Tulang Bawang Regency to the West.
