= East Lampung Regency =

Regency in Lampung, Indonesia

East Lampung Regency Kabupaten Lampung Timur
- Regency
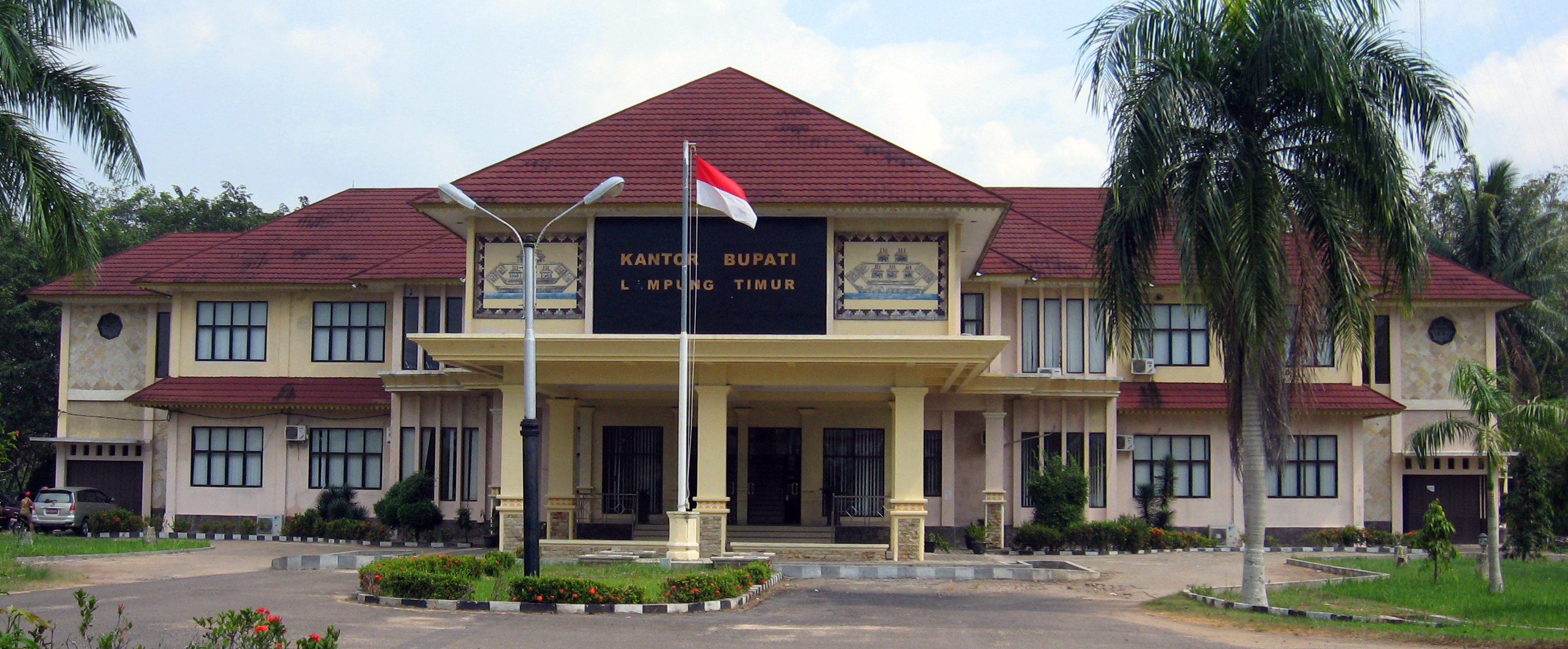
- The regent's office in Sukadana

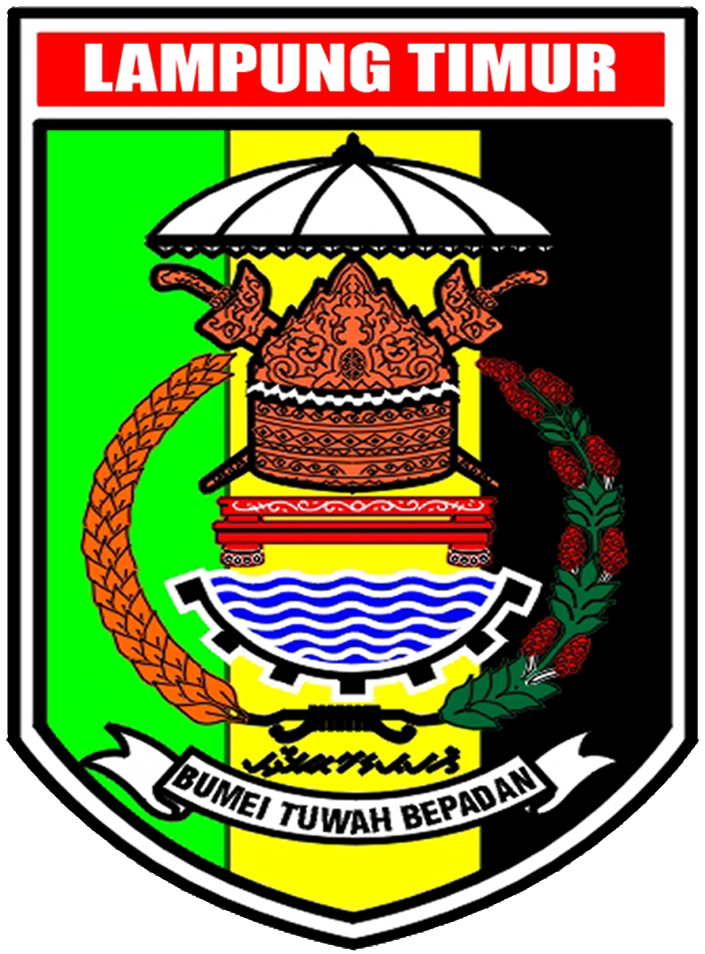
- Coat of arms
- Motto: Bumei Tuwah Bepadan (Prosperity by people's consensus)
- Location within Lampung

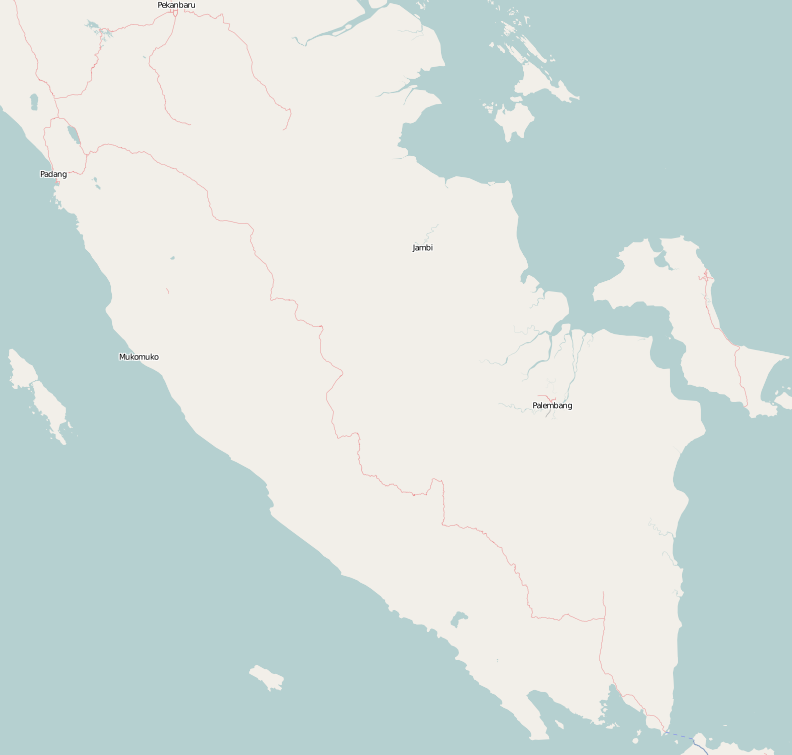
- Location in Southern Sumatra, Sumatra and Indonesia East Lampung Regency (Sumatra) East Lampung Regency (Indonesia)
- Coordinates: 5.1027°S 105.6800°E
- Country: Indonesia
- Province: Lampung
- Regency seat: Sukadana

Government
  - Regent: Ela Siti Nuryamah
  - Vice Regent: Azwar Hadi

Area
  - Total: 5,111.05 km^{2} (1,973.39 sq mi)

Population (2025 estimate)
  - Total: 1,140,290
  - Density: 223.103/km^{2} (577.834/sq mi)
- Time zone: UTC+7 (IWST)
- Area code: (+62) 725
- Website: lampungtimurkab.go.id

East Lampung Regency is a regency (kabupaten) of Lampung Province, Sumatra, Indonesia. It has an area of 5,111.05 km^{2} and a population of 951,639 people at the 2010 census and 1,110,340 at the 2020 census. The official estimate as of mid 2025 was 1,140,290 (comprising 579,170 males and 561,120 females). The administrative headquarters is in the town of Sukadana.

It contains the Way Kambas National Park and Satwa Elephant Eco Lodge.

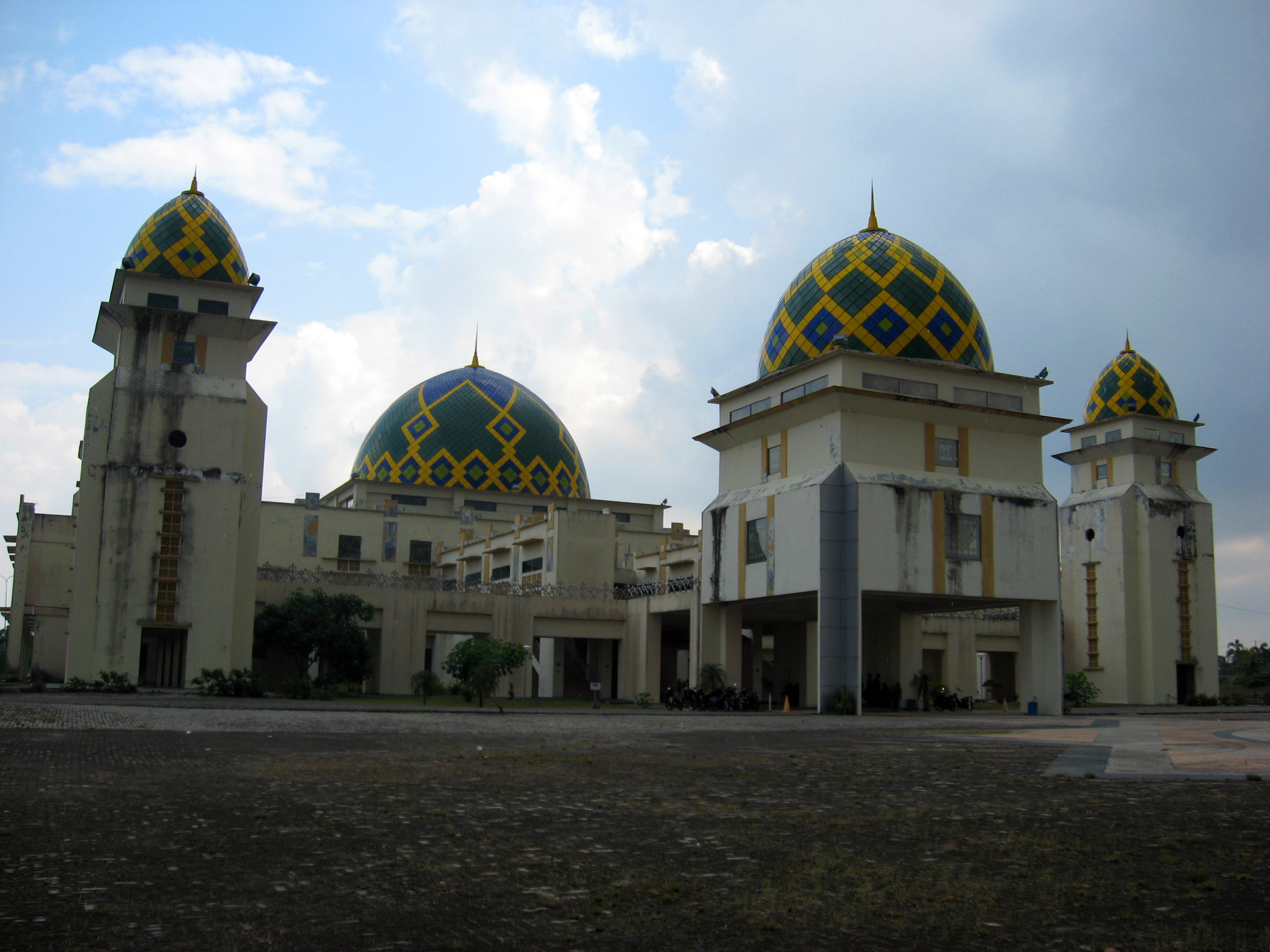
The government-owned and operated Islamic Centre

== History ==
In 1989, the Islamist civilians in Talangsari village of East Lampung Regency were massacred by Indonesian Army troops, in an event known as Talangsari incident.

In January 2010 an outbreak of bird flu occurred in East Lampung Regency.

== Administrative districts ==
East Lampung Regency is divided into twenty-four administrative districts (kecamatan), tabulated below with their areas and their populations at the 2010 census and the 2020 census, together with the official estimates as of mid 2025. They are grouped for convenience into three geographical zones which have no administrative significance. The table also includes the locations of the district administrative centres, the number of administrative villages (all classed as rural desa) in each district and its post code.

Kode Wilayah	Name of District (kecamatan)	Area in km^{2}	Pop'n census 2010	Pop'n census 2020	Pop'n estimate mid 2025	Admin centre	No. of villages	Post code
18.07.10	Metro Kibang	63.28	20,707	24,250	25,270	Kibang	7	34331 -34335
18.07.06	Batanghari	74.38	54,601	60,038	61,450	Banar Joyo	17	34381
18.07.05	Sekampung	93.57	59,819	67,301	69,100	Sumber Gede	17	34382
18.07.11	Marga Tiga	372.46	43,395	50,196	50,530	Tanjung Harapan	13	34386
	Western group	603.69	178,522	201,785	206,350		54	
18.07.12	Sekampung Udik (Upriver Sekampung)	220.65	68,093	77,051	80,170	Pugung Raharjo	15	34385
18.07.03	Jabung	291.04	46,550	54,851	56,260	Negara Batin	15	34384
18.07.19	Pasir Sakti	216.17	34,410	43,425	42,970	Mulyo Sari	8	34387
18.07.20	Waway Karya	194.87	34,454	42,461	43,790	Sumber Rejo	11	34376
18.07.24	Marga Sekampung	169.29	26,035	29,256	30,640	Peniangan	8	34383
18.07.02	Labuhan Maringgai ^{(a)}	149.98	61,158	76,849	81,010	Labuhan Maringgai	11	34198
18.07.16	Mataram Baru	76.64	26,672	31,547	31,520	Mataram Baru	7	34199
18.07.15	Bandar Sribhawono	110.51	46,133	51,396	54,610	Sribhawono	7	34389
18.07.17	Melinting	152.15	24,630	29,858	29,530	Wana	6	34377
18.07.18	Gunung Pelindung	75.17	21,052	24,565	24,340	Negeri Agung	5	34388
18.07.07	Way Japara	125.79	51,073	57,946	60,570	Braja Sakti	16	34396
18.07.22	Braja Slebah	1,383.72	21,733	26,824	26,590	Braja Harjosari	7	34196
	Southern group	3,165.98	461,993	546,029	562,000		116	
18.07.21	Labuhan Ratu	199.59	41,386	51,979	52,690	Labuhan Ratu	11	34375
18.07.01	Sukadana	627.89	64,093	74,830	79,170	Sukadana	20	34194
18.07.14	Bumi Agung	84.75	16,931	20,478	20,950	Donomulyo	7	34182
18.07.13	Batanghari Nuban	145.84	40,992	47,712	48,990	Sukaraja Nuban	13	34372
18.07.04	Pekalongan	71.74	45,209	53,015	54,490	Pekalongan	12	34391
18.07.09	Raman Utara (North Raman)	94.03	35,760	41,314	41,930	Kota Raman	11	34371
18.07.08	Purbolinggo	64.21	40,152	45,768	46,490	Taman Fajar	12	34192
18.07.23	Way Bungur ^{(b)}	53.35	22,058	26,330	27,250	Tambah Subur	8	34373
	Northern group	1,341.38	306,581	361,426	371,940		94	
	Totals	5,111.05	951,639	1,110,340	1,140,290	Sukadana	264	

Notes: (a) including 3 small islands - Pulau Gosongsekopong (just offshore), and - much further east in the Java Sea - the Segama Islands comprising Pulau Segama Besar and Pulau Segama Kecil.
(b) formerly Purbolinggo Utara (or North Purbolinggo).
