= Gedung Meneng, Tulang Bawang =

District of Indonesia

Gedung Meneng District (Kecamatan Gedung Meneng)
- District
- Interactive map of Gedung Meneng District
- Country: Indonesia
- Province: Lampung
- Regency: Tulang Bawang Regency
- District: Gedung Meneng

Government
  - District Head: -

Area
  - Total: 657.07 km^{2} (253.70 sq mi)

Population (mid 2022 estimate)
  - Total: 31,724
  - Density: 48.281/km^{2} (125.05/sq mi)
- Time zone: UTC+7 (Indonesia Western Time)
- Vehicle registration: BE
- Website: gedungmeneng.tulangbawangkab.go.id

Gedung Meneng is a district located in the Tulang Bawang Regency of Lampung in Sumatra, Indonesia.
