= Dente Teladas, Tulang Bawang =

District of Indonesia

Coordinates: 4°25′33″S 105°47′31″E

Dente Teladas District (Kecamatan Dente Teladas)
- District
- Interactive map of Dente Teladas District
- Country: Indonesia
- Province: Lampung
- Regency: Tulang Bawang Regency
- District: Dente Teladas

Government
  - District Head: -

Area
  - Total: 685.65 km^{2} (264.73 sq mi)

Population (mid 2022 estimate)
  - Total: 54,556
  - Density: 79.568/km^{2} (206.08/sq mi)
- Time zone: UTC+7 (Indonesia Western Time)
- Vehicle registration: BE
- Website: denteteladas.tulangbawangkab.go.id

Dente Teladas is a district located in the Tulang Bawang Regency of Lampung in Sumatra, Indonesia.

== Border ==
The border district of Dente Teladas as follows:
