= Rawajitu Selatan, Tulang Bawang =

District of Indonesia

South Rawajitu District (Kecamatan Rawajitu Selatan)
- District
- Interactive map of South Rawajitu District
- Country: Indonesia
- Province: Lampung
- Regency: Tulang Bawang Regency
- District: South Rawajitu (Rawajitu Selatan)

Government
  - District Head: -

Area
  - Total: 123.94 km^{2} (47.85 sq mi)

Population (mid 2022 estimate)
  - Total: 31,593
  - Density: 254.91/km^{2} (660.20/sq mi)
- Time zone: UTC+7 (Indonesia Western Time)
- Vehicle registration: BE
- Website: rawajituselatan.tulangbawangkab.go.id

South Rawajitu (Indonesian: Rawajitu Selatan) is a district (kecamatan) located in the Tulang Bawang Regency of Lampung Province in Sumatra, Indonesia.
