= Banjar Margo, Tulang Bawang =

District of Indonesia

Banjar Margo
- District
- Location in Lampung
- Coordinates: 4.2227138°S 105.28970419999999°E
- Country: Indonesia
- Province: Lampung
- Regency: Tulang Bawang Regency
- Village: 12

Area
  - Total: 132.95 km^{2} (51.33 sq mi)

Population (mid 2022 estimate)
  - Total: 41,304
  - Density: 310.67/km^{2} (804.64/sq mi)
- Time zone: UTC+7 (Indonesia Western Time)
- Vehicle registration: BE
- Website: banjarmargo.tulangbawangkab.go.id

Banjar Margo is a district (kecamatan) located in the Tulang Bawang Regency of Lampung Province in Sumatra, Indonesia.

== Border ==
The district of Banjar Margo is bordered as follows:

- North - Mesuji Regency
- South - Banjar Agung District
- West - West Tulang Bawang Regency
- East - Gedung Aji District.
