= East Menggala, Tulang Bawang =

District of Indonesia

East Menggala District (Kecamatan Menggala Timur)
- District
- Interactive map of East Menggala District
- Coordinates: 4°24′32″S 105°18′07″E
- Country: Indonesia
- Province: Lampung
- Regency: Tulang Bawang Regency
- District: East Menggala (Menggala Timur)

Government
  - District Head: -

Area
  - Total: 193.53 km^{2} (74.72 sq mi)

Population (mid 2022 estimate)
  - Total: 15,640
  - Density: 80.81/km^{2} (209.3/sq mi)
- Time zone: UTC+7 (Indonesia Western Time)
- Vehicle registration: BE
- Website: menggalatimur.tulangbawangkab.go.id

East Menggala (Indonesian: Menggala Timur) is a district located in the Tulang Bawang Regency of Lampung in Sumatra, Indonesia.
