= Purbolinggo =

Purbolinggo Kecamatan Purbolinggo
- District
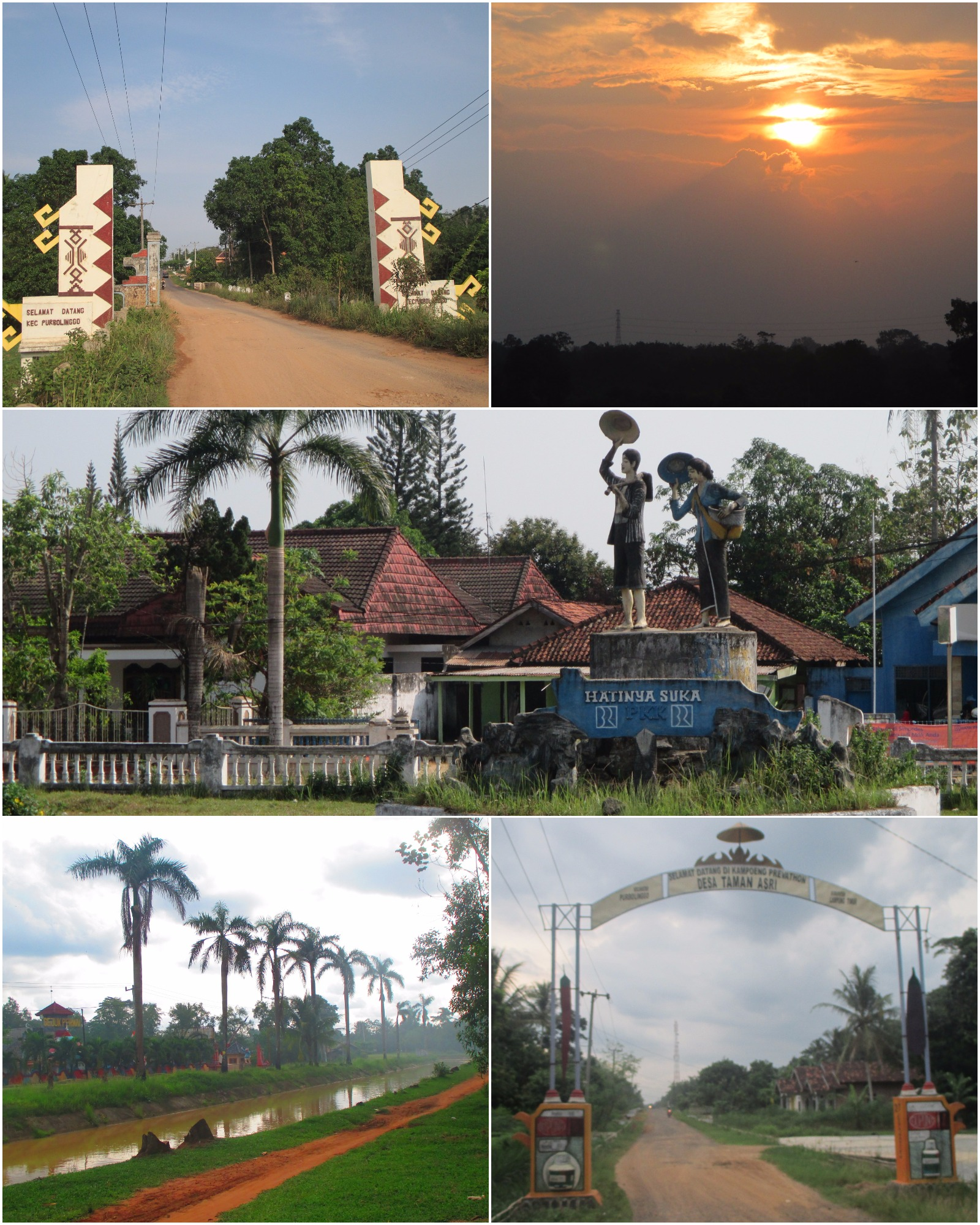
- View of District Purbolinggo
- Nickname: Purbolinggo (Called as Linggo)
- Motto: The Spirit of People's
- Location within Indonesia
- Coordinates: 4°58′01″S 105°30′44″E
- Country: Indonesia
- Province: Lampung
- Regency: East Lampung Regency
- District: Purbolinggo
- Village: 12

Government
  - Subdistricts Head: Amir Hamzah, S.sos, MM.

Area
  - Total: 222.03 km^{2} (85.73 sq mi)
- Elevation: 214 m (702 ft)

Population (mid 2024 Estimate)
  - Total: 45,830
  - Density: 206.4/km^{2} (534.6/sq mi)
- Demonym: Javanese
- Time zone: UTC+7 (Western Indonesian Time)
  - Summer (DST): UTC+7:30 (Western Indonesian Time)
- Area code: +62 725
- Vehicle registration: BE
- Website: purbolinggo.lampungtimurkab.go.id

Purbolinggo or Linggo is a kecamatan (district) of the East Lampung Regency (Lampung Timur) in Lampung province, on Sumatra, in Indonesia.

The district is located to the east of Sukadana and to the northeast of Bandar Lampung (the capital city of Lampung province), about 70 kilometres (43 mi) away.

== Village ==
Purbolinggo is divided into twelve administrative villages, there are shown on table below:

Table villages and a population of districts Purbolinggo
| No | Name of Village | Area (km^{2}) | Number of Sub-villages | Population (2020 Census) |
|---|---|---|---|---|
| 1. | Taman Asri | 5.85 | 4 | 3,263 |
| 2. | Taman Bogo | 5.49 | 5 | 4,257 |
| 3. | Tambah Dadi | 5.05 | 4 | 3,216 |
| 4. | Taman Cari | 6.09 | 5 | 3,889 |
| 5. | Taman Endah | 5.02 | 4 | 2,888 |
| 6. | Taman Fajar | 4.80 | 6 | 3,688 |
| 7. | Tegal Gondo | 3.45 | 4 | 1,828 |
| 8. | Toto Harjo | 4.54 | 5 | 3,784 |
| 9. | Tambah Luhur | 4.50 | 4 | 1,923 |
| 10. | Tanjung Inten | 5.31 | 6 | 4,710 |
| 11. | Tegal Yoso | 5.37 | 6 | 2,960 |
| 12 | Tanjung Kesuma | 6.11 | 6 | 3,746 |
| | Total | 61.58 | 59 | 40,152 |

== Border ==
The border district of Purbolinggo as follows;

- Bordered by Way Bungur District to the North.
- Bordered by Sukadana District to the South.
- Bordered by North Raman District to the West.
- Bordered by Way Kambas National Park to the East.

== List of schools ==
=== Middle schools ===
1. SMP Negeri 1 Purbolinggo
2. SMP Negeri 2 Purbolinggo
3. SMP Islam Purbolinggo
4. SMP Muhammadiyah 1 Purbolinggo
5. SMP PGRI Purbolinggo
6. SLB Negeri Kabupaten Lampung Timur

=== Senior high schools ===
1. SMA Negeri 1 Purbolinggo
2. SMA Muhammadiyah 1 Purbolinggo
3. SMA Ma'arif NU 5 Purbolinggo
4. SMK Ma'arif NU Purbolinggo
5. SMK Budi Bhakti Purbolinggo

== Tourism ==
- Sejuk Permai Resort (Swimming Pool and Billiard Center), in Toto Harjo.
- Elephant Response Unit (ERUs), in Tegal Yoso.
- Kusuma Jaya I and Kusuma Jaya II Dam, in Tanjung Kesuma.
- Tani Monument, in Taman Fajar
