= Gedung Aji, Tulang Bawang =

District of Indonesia

Gedung Aji District (Kecamatan Gedung Aji)
- District
- Interactive map of Gedung Aji District
- Country: Indonesia
- Province: Lampung
- Regency: Tulang Bawang Regency
- District: Gedung Aji

Government
  - District Head: -

Area
  - Total: 114.47 km^{2} (44.20 sq mi)

Population (mid 2022 estimate)
  - Total: 14,718
  - Density: 128.58/km^{2} (333.01/sq mi)
- Time zone: UTC+7 (Indonesia Western Time)
- Vehicle registration: BE
- Website: gedungaji.tulangbawangkab.go.id

Gedung Aji is a district (kecamatan) located in the Tulang Bawang Regency of Lampung Province in Sumatra, Indonesia.
