= List of active Indonesian Navy ships =

All the Indonesian Navy (Indonesian: Tentara Nasional Indonesia-Angkatan Laut, TNI-AL) vessels are named with the prefix KRI (Kapal Perang Republik Indonesia or Naval Vessel of the Republic of Indonesia). Smaller sized boats with light armaments usually have the prefix KAL (Kapal Angkatan Laut or Naval Vessel of the Indonesian Navy). The classes are often named after lead ships or the first ship commissioned.

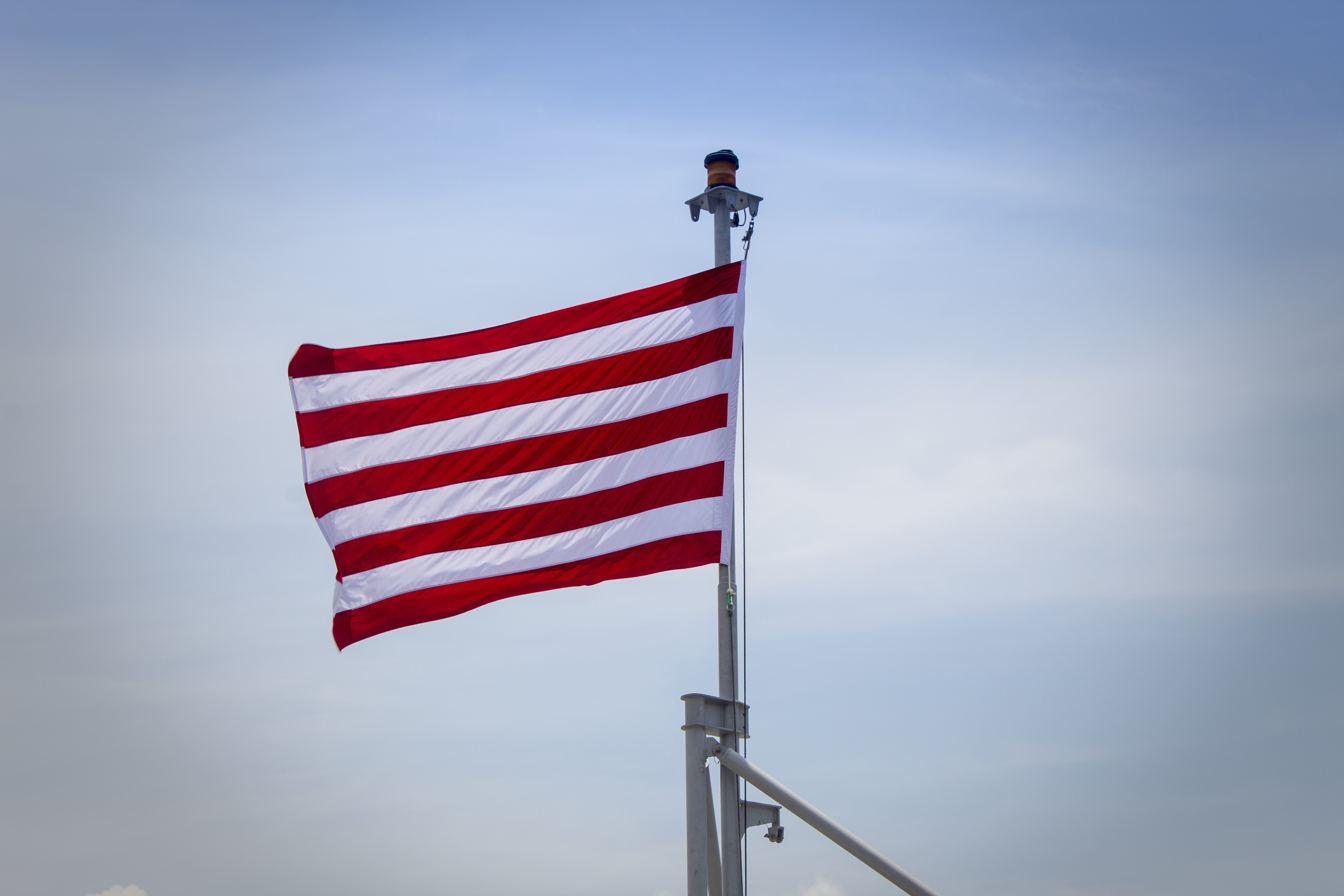
Indonesian Naval Jack onboard KRI Diponegoro (365)

The Indonesian Navy has a traditional naming convention for its ships. Moreover, the ship's type and missions can be identified by the first number on the ship's three-digit hull number, which is located at the bow and the stern of a vessel. The naming convention is such as:

- Hull number beginning with 1 (aircraft carriers): historical empires and kingdoms
- Hull number beginning with 2 (cruisers and destroyers): Indonesia's main islands (for cruisers), national heroes and other historical figures (for destroyers)
- Hull number beginning with 3 (frigates, corvettes): national heroes, naval heroes, or other historical figures
- Hull number beginning with 4 (submarines, submarine tenders): mythical weapons (for submarines), national heroes (for submarine tenders)
- Hull number beginning with 5 (amphibious ships, LSTs, LPDs, LCUs, command ships): strategic bays or gulfs (for LSTs), big cities (for LPDs), small cities (for LCUs), national figures (for command ships)
- Hull number beginning with 6 (fast attack craft): mythical weapons (previous names for missile boats), traditional weapons (current names for fast missile boats), wild animals (for fast torpedo boats)
- Hull number beginning with 7 (minesweepers, minehunters): every island begin with letter "R", letter "F" (mine countermeasures vessel)
- Hull number beginning with 8 (patrol boats): native fishes and sea creatures, native snakes and wild reptiles, wild insects, geographical places (such as towns, lakes or rivers begin with "si-", e.g. Sikuda, Sigurot, Sibarau)
- Hull number beginning with 9 (supporting ships, oilers, tugs, troop transports, oceanographic research ships, sailing ships, etc.): volcanoes, cities, mythical figures, geographical capes and straits

== Aircraft carriers ==
Aircraft carriers are named after past kingdoms and empires with hull numbers beginning with 1.

Class	Picture	Type	Ships	Origin	Note
Sriwijaya class		Light aircraft carrier	KRI Sriwijaya (100)	Italy	In active service. Its aircraft complement acquisition is in progress.

== Submarine fleet ==
Submarines have hull numbers starting with 4 and are named after mythological weapons.

Class	Picture	Type	Boats	Origin	Note
Submarine (4 in active service, 2 under construction)
Tbd		Attack submarine	KRI Tbd	France; Indonesia	Construction of two Scorpène Evolved submarines started in August 2026.
Tbd		Attack submarine	KRI Tbd	France; Indonesia	Construction of two Scorpène Evolved submarines started in August 2026.
Nagapasa class	DLTJ4R UEAEckdn	Attack submarine	KRI Nagapasa (403)	South Korea; Indonesia	In active service. Variant of Jang Bogo-class submarine design.
Nagapasa class	DLTJ4R UEAEckdn	Attack submarine	KRI Ardadedali (404)	South Korea; Indonesia	In active service. Variant of Jang Bogo-class submarine design.
Nagapasa class	DLTJ4R UEAEckdn	Attack submarine	KRI Alugoro (405)	South Korea; Indonesia	In active service. Variant of Jang Bogo-class submarine design.
Cakra class	Kri cakra 401	Attack submarine	KRI Cakra (401)	Germany	In active service. Variant of type 209 submarine design.
Midget Submarine (6 planned)
Drass DGK		Midget submarine	Tbd	Italy	6 units planned.
Submersibles (2 in active service)
PAL KSOT		XLUUV		Indonesia	Undisclosed number on order as of June 2026, previously reported 30 units planned.
Drass DS8 SDV		SDV		Italy	2 in active service.

== Surface fleet ==
Surface ships are typically named after national heroes or other historical figures of Indonesia and have hull numbers beginning with 3.

Class	Picture	Type	Ships	Origin	Notes
Frigate (9 in active service, 1 fitting out, 1 under construction, 2 on order)
Balaputradewa class		General Purpose Frigate	KRI Balaputradewa (322) (Fitting out)	Indonesia; United Kingdom	Type 31 frigate Known locally as "FMP" (Fregat Merah Putih or "Red White Frigate"). Second ship keel laying on 15 November 2024. Lead ship launched on 18 December 2025. A Letter of Intent for two additional ships signed on 21 January 2026.
Balaputradewa class		General Purpose Frigate	KRI Tbd (Under construction)	Indonesia; United Kingdom	Type 31 frigate Known locally as "FMP" (Fregat Merah Putih or "Red White Frigate"). Second ship keel laying on 15 November 2024. Lead ship launched on 18 December 2025. A Letter of Intent for two additional ships signed on 21 January 2026.
Brawijaya class		General Purpose Frigate	KRI Brawijaya (320)	Italy	In active service. Locally classified as frigate.
Brawijaya class		General Purpose Frigate	KRI Prabu Siliwangi (321)	Italy	In active service. Locally classified as frigate.
Istanbul class		General Purpose Frigate	KRI Tbd	Turkey	On order. Two Istanbul-class frigates ordered on 26 July 2025.
Istanbul class		General Purpose Frigate	KRI Tbd	Turkey	On order. Two Istanbul-class frigates ordered on 26 July 2025.
Martadinata class		Guided-missile Frigate	KRI Raden Eddy Martadinata (331)	Netherlands; Indonesia	In active service. Variant of Sigma-class design. Known locally as "PKR" (Perusak Kawal Rudal or "Guided Missile Destroyer Escort").
Martadinata class		Guided-missile Frigate	KRI I Gusti Ngurah Rai (332)	Netherlands; Indonesia	In active service. Variant of Sigma-class design. Known locally as "PKR" (Perusak Kawal Rudal or "Guided Missile Destroyer Escort").
Ahmad Yani class		Guided-missile Frigate	KRI Ahmad Yani (351)	Netherlands	In active service. Ex-Van Speijk-class frigate upgraded and refurbished.
Ahmad Yani class		Guided-missile Frigate	KRI Yos Sudarso (353)	Netherlands	In active service. Ex-Van Speijk-class frigate upgraded and refurbished.
Ahmad Yani class		Guided-missile Frigate	KRI Oswald Siahaan (354)	Netherlands	In active service. Ex-Van Speijk-class frigate upgraded and refurbished.
Ahmad Yani class		Guided-missile Frigate	KRI Abdul Halim Perdanakusuma (355)	Netherlands	In active service. Ex-Van Speijk-class frigate upgraded and refurbished.
Ahmad Yani class		Guided-missile Frigate	KRI Karel Satsuitubun (356)	Netherlands	In active service. Ex-Van Speijk-class frigate upgraded and refurbished.
Corvette (26 in active service)
Bung Tomo class	Indonesian corvette KRI John Lie (358) at sea in August 2015	Guided-missile Corvette	KRI Bung Tomo (357)	United Kingdom	In active service. Ex-Nakhoda Ragam-class corvette.
Bung Tomo class	Indonesian corvette KRI John Lie (358) at sea in August 2015	Guided-missile Corvette	KRI John Lie (358)	United Kingdom	In active service. Ex-Nakhoda Ragam-class corvette.
Bung Tomo class	Indonesian corvette KRI John Lie (358) at sea in August 2015	Guided-missile Corvette	KRI Usman Harun (359)	United Kingdom	In active service. Ex-Nakhoda Ragam-class corvette.
Diponegoro class	Diponegoro-class corvette	Guided-missile Corvette	KRI Diponegoro (365)	Netherlands	In active service. Variant of Sigma-class design.
Diponegoro class	Diponegoro-class corvette	Guided-missile Corvette	KRI Sultan Hasanuddin (366)	Netherlands	In active service. Variant of Sigma-class design.
Diponegoro class	Diponegoro-class corvette	Guided-missile Corvette	KRI Sultan Iskandar Muda (367)	Netherlands	In active service. Variant of Sigma-class design.
Diponegoro class	Diponegoro-class corvette	Guided-missile Corvette	KRI Frans Kaisiepo (368)	Netherlands	In active service. Variant of Sigma-class design.
Bung Karno class		Corvette	KRI Bung Karno (369)	Indonesia	In active service. Designated as Korvet Rudal Heli or "Helicopter Guided Missile Corvette". KRI Bung Karno also serves as presidential transport ship.
Bung Karno class		Corvette	KRI Bung Hatta (370)	Indonesia	In active service. Designated as Korvet Rudal Heli or "Helicopter Guided Missile Corvette". KRI Bung Karno also serves as presidential transport ship.
Fatahillah class		Corvette	KRI Fatahillah (361)	Netherlands	In active service. KRI Nala (363) features helipad and telescopic hangar for light helicopter.
Fatahillah class		Corvette	KRI Malahayati (362)	Netherlands	In active service. KRI Nala (363) features helipad and telescopic hangar for light helicopter.
Fatahillah class		Corvette	KRI Nala (363)	Netherlands	In active service. KRI Nala (363) features helipad and telescopic hangar for light helicopter.
Kapitan Pattimura class		ASW Corvette	KRI Kapitan Pattimura (371)	East Germany	In active service. Ex-Parchim I-class (Project 133.1) corvette. Originally, 16 ships were bought. As of 2026, 14 ships still remain in active service.
Kapitan Pattimura class		ASW Corvette	KRI Untung Suropati (372)	East Germany	In active service. Ex-Parchim I-class (Project 133.1) corvette. Originally, 16 ships were bought. As of 2026, 14 ships still remain in active service.
Kapitan Pattimura class		ASW Corvette	KRI Sultan Nuku (373)	East Germany	In active service. Ex-Parchim I-class (Project 133.1) corvette. Originally, 16 ships were bought. As of 2026, 14 ships still remain in active service.
Kapitan Pattimura class		ASW Corvette	KRI Lambung Mangkurat (374)	East Germany	In active service. Ex-Parchim I-class (Project 133.1) corvette. Originally, 16 ships were bought. As of 2026, 14 ships still remain in active service.
Kapitan Pattimura class		ASW Corvette	KRI Cut Nyak Dien (375)	East Germany	In active service. Ex-Parchim I-class (Project 133.1) corvette. Originally, 16 ships were bought. As of 2026, 14 ships still remain in active service.
Kapitan Pattimura class		ASW Corvette	KRI Sultan Thaha Syaifuddin (376)	East Germany	In active service. Ex-Parchim I-class (Project 133.1) corvette. Originally, 16 ships were bought. As of 2026, 14 ships still remain in active service.
Kapitan Pattimura class		ASW Corvette	KRI Sutanto (377)	East Germany	In active service. Ex-Parchim I-class (Project 133.1) corvette. Originally, 16 ships were bought. As of 2026, 14 ships still remain in active service.
Kapitan Pattimura class		ASW Corvette	KRI Sutedi Senoputra (378)	East Germany	In active service. Ex-Parchim I-class (Project 133.1) corvette. Originally, 16 ships were bought. As of 2026, 14 ships still remain in active service.
Kapitan Pattimura class		ASW Corvette	KRI Wiratno (379)	East Germany	In active service. Ex-Parchim I-class (Project 133.1) corvette. Originally, 16 ships were bought. As of 2026, 14 ships still remain in active service.
Kapitan Pattimura class		ASW Corvette	KRI Tjiptadi (381)	East Germany	In active service. Ex-Parchim I-class (Project 133.1) corvette. Originally, 16 ships were bought. As of 2026, 14 ships still remain in active service.
Kapitan Pattimura class		ASW Corvette	KRI Hasan Basri (382)	East Germany	In active service. Ex-Parchim I-class (Project 133.1) corvette. Originally, 16 ships were bought. As of 2026, 14 ships still remain in active service.
Kapitan Pattimura class		ASW Corvette	KRI Imam Bonjol (383)	East Germany	In active service. Ex-Parchim I-class (Project 133.1) corvette. Originally, 16 ships were bought. As of 2026, 14 ships still remain in active service.
Kapitan Pattimura class		ASW Corvette	KRI Teuku Umar (385)	East Germany	In active service. Ex-Parchim I-class (Project 133.1) corvette. Originally, 16 ships were bought. As of 2026, 14 ships still remain in active service.
Kapitan Pattimura class		ASW Corvette	KRI Silas Papare (386)	East Germany	In active service. Ex-Parchim I-class (Project 133.1) corvette. Originally, 16 ships were bought. As of 2026, 14 ships still remain in active service.
Offshore Patrol Vessel (2 on trials, 1 under construction)
Raja Haji Fisabilillah class		Offshore Patrol Vessel	KRI Raja Haji Fisabilillah (391) (Sea trials)	Indonesia	Designated as OPV-90M. First ship launched on 18 September 2024. Second ship launched on 20 September 2024. Third ship keel laying on 19 November 2025.
Raja Haji Fisabilillah class		Offshore Patrol Vessel	KRI Lukas Rumkorem (392) (Sea trials)	Indonesia	Designated as OPV-90M. First ship launched on 18 September 2024. Second ship launched on 20 September 2024. Third ship keel laying on 19 November 2025.
Raja Haji Fisabilillah class		Offshore Patrol Vessel	KRI Tbd (Under construction)	Indonesia	Designated as OPV-90M. First ship launched on 18 September 2024. Second ship launched on 20 September 2024. Third ship keel laying on 19 November 2025.

== Amphibious Warfare fleet ==
Amphibious Warfare ships have hull numbers starting with 5. LSTs with helipads and LPDs with wider flight decks are generally used for transport, whereas the reverse is used for amphibious warfare. Command ships are named after national figures, LPDs are named after maritime cities, and LSTs are named after bays.

Class	Picture	Type	Ships	Origin	Note
Command Ship (1 in active service)
Multatuli class		Command Ship	KRI Multatuli (561)	Japan	In active service. (Note: Built as submarine tender but later converted into command ship with the addition of hangar for medium class helicopter and Satcom/radar equipments in 1998. The vessel is capable of providing replenishment at sea)
Landing Platform Dock (5 in active service)
Makassar class	Kri makassar-590 KRI Banda Aceh	Landing Platform Dock	KRI Makassar (590)	South Korea; Indonesia	In active service. The last two ship of the class features a third helicopter landing spot, shortened superstructure and different mast design.
Makassar class	Kri makassar-590 KRI Banda Aceh	Landing Platform Dock	KRI Surabaya (591)	South Korea; Indonesia	In active service. The last two ship of the class features a third helicopter landing spot, shortened superstructure and different mast design.
Makassar class	Kri makassar-590 KRI Banda Aceh	Landing Platform Dock	KRI Banjarmasin (592)	South Korea; Indonesia	In active service. The last two ship of the class features a third helicopter landing spot, shortened superstructure and different mast design.
Makassar class	Kri makassar-590 KRI Banda Aceh	Landing Platform Dock	KRI Banda Aceh (593)	South Korea; Indonesia	In active service. The last two ship of the class features a third helicopter landing spot, shortened superstructure and different mast design.
Semarang class		Landing Platform Dock	KRI Semarang (594)	Indonesia	In active service. Sister class of the Makassar class. Modified Tarlac class design to increase troop capacity with total accommodation up to 771 personnel. As of January 2020, she was used as a provisional hospital ship. On 4 October 2025, it is confirmed by the Navy that she is returned to her basic function as the landing platform dock.
Landing Ship (23 in active service)
Teluk Bintuni class	28bintuni2OK	Landing Ship Tank	KRI Teluk Kendari (518)	Indonesia	In active service. (520), (522), (523), (524) features a large hangar to support sustained helicopter operation. Only (520) has the length of 120 meters and 18 meters beam, the rest of the class were 117 meters long and has 16.4 meters wide beam.
Teluk Bintuni class	28bintuni2OK	Landing Ship Tank	KRI Teluk Kupang (519)	Indonesia	In active service. (520), (522), (523), (524) features a large hangar to support sustained helicopter operation. Only (520) has the length of 120 meters and 18 meters beam, the rest of the class were 117 meters long and has 16.4 meters wide beam.
Teluk Bintuni class	28bintuni2OK	Landing Ship Tank	KRI Teluk Bintuni (520)	Indonesia	In active service. (520), (522), (523), (524) features a large hangar to support sustained helicopter operation. Only (520) has the length of 120 meters and 18 meters beam, the rest of the class were 117 meters long and has 16.4 meters wide beam.
Teluk Bintuni class	28bintuni2OK	Landing Ship Tank	KRI Teluk Lada (521)	Indonesia	In active service. (520), (522), (523), (524) features a large hangar to support sustained helicopter operation. Only (520) has the length of 120 meters and 18 meters beam, the rest of the class were 117 meters long and has 16.4 meters wide beam.
Teluk Bintuni class	28bintuni2OK	Landing Ship Tank	KRI Teluk Youtefa (522)	Indonesia	In active service. (520), (522), (523), (524) features a large hangar to support sustained helicopter operation. Only (520) has the length of 120 meters and 18 meters beam, the rest of the class were 117 meters long and has 16.4 meters wide beam.
Teluk Bintuni class	28bintuni2OK	Landing Ship Tank	KRI Teluk Palu (523)	Indonesia	In active service. (520), (522), (523), (524) features a large hangar to support sustained helicopter operation. Only (520) has the length of 120 meters and 18 meters beam, the rest of the class were 117 meters long and has 16.4 meters wide beam.
Teluk Bintuni class	28bintuni2OK	Landing Ship Tank	KRI Teluk Calang (524)	Indonesia	In active service. (520), (522), (523), (524) features a large hangar to support sustained helicopter operation. Only (520) has the length of 120 meters and 18 meters beam, the rest of the class were 117 meters long and has 16.4 meters wide beam.
Teluk Bintuni class	28bintuni2OK	Landing Ship Tank	KRI Teluk Weda (526)	Indonesia	In active service. (520), (522), (523), (524) features a large hangar to support sustained helicopter operation. Only (520) has the length of 120 meters and 18 meters beam, the rest of the class were 117 meters long and has 16.4 meters wide beam.
Teluk Bintuni class	28bintuni2OK	Landing Ship Tank	KRI Teluk Wondama (527)	Indonesia	In active service. (520), (522), (523), (524) features a large hangar to support sustained helicopter operation. Only (520) has the length of 120 meters and 18 meters beam, the rest of the class were 117 meters long and has 16.4 meters wide beam.
Teluk Langsa class		Landing Ship Tank	KRI Teluk Amboina (503)	Japan	In active service. (503) bought from Japan in 1961 (a copy of US LST-511-class).
Teluk Semangka class	KRI Teluk Ende	Landing Ship Tank	KRI Teluk Sampit (515)	South Korea	In active service. The last two ships in the series (516 & 517) include a large hangar built into the superstructure.
Teluk Semangka class	KRI Teluk Ende	Landing Ship Tank	KRI Teluk Banten (516)	South Korea	In active service. The last two ships in the series (516 & 517) include a large hangar built into the superstructure.
Teluk Semangka class	KRI Teluk Ende	Landing Ship Tank	KRI Teluk Ende (517)	South Korea	In active service. The last two ships in the series (516 & 517) include a large hangar built into the superstructure.
Teluk Gilimanuk class	KRI Teluk Manado 537	Landing Ship Medium	KRI Teluk Gilimanuk (531)	East Germany	In active service. Ex-Frosch I (531–542) & Frosch II (543–544)-class medium landing ships. Out of 14 ships only 10 remain in service.
Teluk Gilimanuk class	KRI Teluk Manado 537	Landing Ship Medium	KRI Teluk Celukan Bawang (532)	East Germany	In active service. Ex-Frosch I (531–542) & Frosch II (543–544)-class medium landing ships. Out of 14 ships only 10 remain in service.
Teluk Gilimanuk class	KRI Teluk Manado 537	Landing Ship Medium	KRI Teluk Cendrawasih (533)	East Germany	In active service. Ex-Frosch I (531–542) & Frosch II (543–544)-class medium landing ships. Out of 14 ships only 10 remain in service.
Teluk Gilimanuk class	KRI Teluk Manado 537	Landing Ship Medium	KRI Teluk Sibolga (536)	East Germany	In active service. Ex-Frosch I (531–542) & Frosch II (543–544)-class medium landing ships. Out of 14 ships only 10 remain in service.
Teluk Gilimanuk class	KRI Teluk Manado 537	Landing Ship Medium	KRI Teluk Manado (537)	East Germany	In active service. Ex-Frosch I (531–542) & Frosch II (543–544)-class medium landing ships. Out of 14 ships only 10 remain in service.
Teluk Gilimanuk class	KRI Teluk Manado 537	Landing Ship Medium	KRI Teluk Parigi (539)	East Germany	In active service. Ex-Frosch I (531–542) & Frosch II (543–544)-class medium landing ships. Out of 14 ships only 10 remain in service.
Teluk Gilimanuk class	KRI Teluk Manado 537	Landing Ship Medium	KRI Teluk Lampung (540)	East Germany	In active service. Ex-Frosch I (531–542) & Frosch II (543–544)-class medium landing ships. Out of 14 ships only 10 remain in service.
Teluk Gilimanuk class	KRI Teluk Manado 537	Landing Ship Medium	KRI Teluk Sangkulirang (542)	East Germany	In active service. Ex-Frosch I (531–542) & Frosch II (543–544)-class medium landing ships. Out of 14 ships only 10 remain in service.
Teluk Gilimanuk class	KRI Teluk Manado 537	Landing Ship Medium	KRI Teluk Cirebon (543)	East Germany	In active service. Ex-Frosch I (531–542) & Frosch II (543–544)-class medium landing ships. Out of 14 ships only 10 remain in service.
Teluk Gilimanuk class	KRI Teluk Manado 537	Landing Ship Medium	KRI Teluk Sabang (544)	East Germany	In active service. Ex-Frosch I (531–542) & Frosch II (543–544)-class medium landing ships. Out of 14 ships only 10 remain in service.

== Fast Attack Craft fleet ==
Fast attack crafts are small vessels that are used in hit-and-run strategies and have hull numbers beginning with 6. Missile boats are named after traditional weapons from Indonesia while torpedo boats are named after wild animals.

Class	Picture	Type	Ships	Origin	Note
Fast attack craft (25 in active service, 5 under construction)
FAC/M 70M			KRI Tbd; KRI Tbd	Turkey	Under construction. 70m fast missile craft with turbine gas propulsion, built by Sefine Shipyard. Locally designated as KCR-70M. Construction started on 30 October 2024. The keels were laid on 17 July 2025.
Tbd		Missile boat	KRI Tbd; KRI Tbd	Indonesia	Under construction. Another variant of KCR-60m (68m in length) with water-jet propulsion. Built by PT. Palindo Marine, the keel was laid on 12 June 2024.
Belati class		Missile boat	KRI Belati (622); KRI Tbd; KRI Tbd	Indonesia	In active service. KCR-60M variant with water-jet propulsion. Built by PT. Tesco Indomaritim since 2021. 1 unit entered service.
Klewang class	X3K Trimaran	Missile boat	KRI Golok (688)	Indonesia	In active service. Launched on 21 August 2021 by PT. Lundin Industry Invest in Banyuwangi.
Sampari class		Missile boat	KRI Sampari (628); KRI Tombak (629); KRI Halasan (630) KRI Kerambit (627) KRI Kapak (625); KRI Panah (626)	Indonesia	In active service. Designated as KCR-60M (Kapal Cepat Rudal 60M or Fast Missile Boat 60M).
Clurit class	KRI Kujang	Missile boat	KRI Clurit (641); KRI Kujang (642); KRI Beladau (643); KRI Alamang (644); KRI Surik (645); KRI Siwar (646); KRI Parang (647); KRI Terapang (648)	Indonesia	In active service. Designated as KCR-40M (Kapal Cepat Rudal 40M or Fast Missile Boat 40M).
Mandau class	KRI Badik	Missile boat	KRI Mandau (621); KRI Badik (623); KRI Keris (624)	South Korea	
FPB-57 class	FPB-57 class	Torpedo boat Missile boat	FPB-57 Nav II; KRI Singa (651); KRI Ajak (653) FPB-57 Nav V KRI Todak (631); KRI Lemadang (632); KRI Hiu (634); KRI Layang (635)	Indonesia; Germany	FPB-57 Nav II; Equipped with SUT torpedo. FPB-57 Nav V Improved variant of Nav IV version. KRI Hiu (634) & KRI Layang (635) equipped with C-802 missile.

== Patrol fleet ==
The patrol ships are classified under the prefix KRI, KAL, and Patkamla. KRIs are larger and have more firepower while KALs are smaller and more lightly armed. Most of these smaller boats are better known domestically as Fast Patrol (Patroli Cepat – PC) vessels and are used to patrol and maintain order in Indonesia. Patkamla (Patroli Keamanan Laut) or Marine Security Patrol ships are the smallest in the fleet and are usually only armed with light and heavy machine guns. These boats are mainly used to patrol around various naval bases or Lanal (Pangkalan TNI AL). Due to the sheer number of Lanals, the Navy sources some of its patrol vessels (mostly Patkamla or seldom KAL vessels) from local shipbuilders in the region around its bases' location. This resulted in a varied bunch of ship classes and designs based on different standards adopted by the various ship builder. Patrol boats are named after fish, snakes, and small islands from Indonesia. The larger patrol boats that use the KRI prefix have a hull number that starts with the number 8, while smaller KALs and Patkamlas use a different numbering system.

The list below does not reflect the actual number of patrol vessels used by Indonesian Navy due to various factors, such as insufficient open-source data of some vessels and the lack of coverage by most national or international publications on patrol boats smaller than 18 meters (mostly Patkamla vessels), which are often converted from locally sourced boats near its Lanal location.

Class	Picture	Type	Vessels	Origin	Note
Patrol Boat
Dorang class	Koarmada1tnial-1647921112	Patrol Boat	KRI Dorang (874); KRI Bawal (875); KRI Tuna (876); KRI Marlin (877); KRI Hampala (880); KRI Lumba-Lumba (881)	Indonesia	In active service. Designated as PC-60M (Patroli Cepat 60M or Fast Patrol 60M). First of two ship built by PT. Caputra Mitra Sejati shipyard. Third ship built by PT. Karimun Anugrah Sejati shipyard. Fourth ship built by PT. Palindo Marine Shipyard. Fifth and sixth ship built by PT. Caputra Mitra Sejati shipyard.
FPB-57 class	FPB-57 class	Patrol Boat	FPB-57 Nav I KRI Kakap (811); KRI Kerapu (812); KRI Tongkol (813); KRI Barakuda (814) FPB-57 Nav IV; KRI Pandrong (801); KRI Sura (802)	Indonesia; Germany	FPB-57 Nav I SAR version, equipped with deck for light helicopter. FPB-57 Nav IV; Patrol variant of Nav II version.
Pari class	KRI Torani	Patrol Boat	KRI Pari (849); KRI Sembilang (850); KRI Sidat (851); KRI Cakalang (852); KRI Tatihu (853); KRI Layaran (854); KRI Madidihang (855); KRI Kurau (856); KRI Torani (860); KRI Lepu (861); KRI Albakora (867); KRI Bubara (868); KRI Gulamah (869); KRI Posepa (870); KRI Escolar (871); KRI Karotang (872); KRI Mata Bongsang (873); KRI Butana (878); KRI Selar (879)	Indonesia	In active service. Designated as PC-40M (Patroli Cepat 40M or Fast Patrol 40M). Patrol boat version (without C-705 missile) of Clurit-class. Built by PT. Palindo Marine, PT. Caputra Mitra Sejati, PT. Citra Shipyard & PT. Karimun Anugrah Sejati.
Sibarau class	KRI Tenggiri	Patrol Boat	KRI Sigalu (857); KRI Silea (858); KRI Siribua (859); KRI Siada (862); KRI Sikuda (863); KRI Sigurot (864); KRI Tenggiri (865)	Australia	In active service. ex-Attack-class patrol boat of Australia navy.
Badau class	Badau class	Patrol Boat	KRI Badau (841); KRI Salawaku (842)	Brunei	In active service. ex-Waspada class fast attack craft of Brunei navy.
Krait class	Krait-class	Patrol Boat	KRI Krait (827)	Indonesia	In active service. Built by Fasharkan TNI AL Mentigi with assistance from PT. Batam Expresindo Shipyard.
Cucut class	KRI Cucut	Patrol Boat	KRI Cucut (866)	Singapore	In active service. ex-RSS Jupiter diving support ship of Singapore Navy.
Boa class	Kriwelang	Patrol Boat	KAL Boa; KAL Welang; KAL Suluh Pari; KAL Katon; KAL Sanca; KAL Warakas; KAL Kalakay; KAL Panana; KAL Tedong Naga KAL Kobra; KAL Anakonda; KAL Patola; KAL Kalagian KAL Viper; KAL Piton; KAL Weling; KAL Tedung Selar; KAL Alkura KAL Tarihu; KAL Birang; KAL Mulga	Indonesia	PC-36m & PC-40m patrol boats made of fiberglass. Used to be known as Boa class (PC-36m), Kobra class (PC-36m), Viper class (PC-40m) & Tarihu class (PC-40m) while still bear KRI prefixes. Constructed by Fasharkan TNI AL Manokwari, Fasharkan TNI AL Jakarta, Fasharkan TNI AL Makassar & Fasharkan TNI AL Mentigi (Tanjung Pinang). Taliwangsa, Boiga and Matacora were decommissioned due to various accidents.
Kudungga class	KAL Kudungga	Patrol Boat	KAL Kudungga	Indonesia	PC-38m patrol boat built by PT. Palindo Marine. Given as a grant from government of East Kutai Regency to Lanal Sangatta.
Mamuju class		Patrol Boat	KAL Mamuju	Indonesia	PC-38m patrol boat made of aluminium built by PT. Tesco Indomaritim. Known locally as Fast Offshore Patrol Combat boat.
PC-28m class	KAL Kembang	Patrol Boat	KAL Mansalar; KAL Pohawang; KAL Ratu Samban; KAL Tanjung Pandangan; KAL Kembang; KAL Sambas; KAL Enggano; KAL Simeulue; KAL Sepinggan; KAL Balongan; KAL Jemur; KAL Panda; KAL Sinyaru; KAL Serayu; KAL Belinyu; KAL Samalona; KAL Bokor; KAL Pulau Bengkoang; KAL Tahuna; KAL Baruk; KAL Maribaya; KAL Telaga Tujuh; KAL Tabuan; KAL Tamposo; KAL Balibo	Indonesia	PC-28m patrol boats made of fiberglass built by Fasharkan TNI AL Mentigi since 1993.
Bireuen class	KAL Kumai	Patrol Boat	Water Jet; KAL Bireuen; KAL Kumai; KAL Mapor Propeller; KAL Nipa	Indonesia	PC-28m patrol boats made of aluminium built by PT. Palindo Marine. In active service.
KAL-28m class	KAL Pulau Mego (II-2-15) KAL Rajegwesi	Patrol Boat	KAL Pulau Siantan; KAL Pulau Karakelang; KAL Pulau Nustual; KAL Pulau Ambalat; KAL Pulau Sangihe; KAL Pulau Trangan; KAL Pulau Mego; KAL Pulau Siba; KAL Belongas; KAL Marapas; KAL Lemukutan; KAL Tanjung Pinang; KAL Bunyu; KAL Kelambau; KAL Pulau Bungaran; KAL Pulau Labengki; KAL Limboto; KAL Wayabula; KAL Wayag; KAL Tidore; KAL Pulau Menjangan; KAL Iboih; KAL Sorake; KAL Talise; KAL Lalos; KAL Anyer; KAL Rajegwesi; KAL Manakarra; KAL Pelawan; KAL Pandang; KAL Sarudik; KAL Sembulungan; KAL Hinako	Indonesia	PC-28m patrol boats made of aluminium built by PT. Tesco Indomaritim, PT. Palindo Marine, PT. Infinity Global Mandiri, PT. Lims Nautical Shipyard & PT. Steadfast Marine. In active service. KAL Pulau Pasoso were badly damaged during 2018 Sulawesi earthquake and tsunami, current status decommissioned. Lanal Palu receive KAL Talise as replacement. 2 on order from PT. Citra Shipyard.
Sinabang class	KAL Sinabang	Patrol Boat	KAL Sinabang; KAL Sengiap	Indonesia	KAL-28m patrol boat made of aluminium with water jet propulsion, built by PT. Tesco Indomaritim circa 2013.
Tbd		Patrol Boat	Tbd; Tbd	Japan	18 meters aluminium-hulled patrol boats, to be donated from Japan. On order.
Antasena class		Fast Assault-craft/Patrol Boat	Antasena combat boat	Indonesia	Previously used by the Army, hand-overed to the Navy, 3rd Naval Regional Command (Kodaeral III) on 20 January 2026.
Combat Boat 18m class	Patkamla Bali (I-5-36) Patkamla Pulau Langkai	Fast Assault-craft/Patrol Boat	Patkamla Mamburungan; Patkamla Pulau Bakau; Patkamla Pulau Numfor; Patkamla Bali; Patkamla Pulau Salando; Patkamla Busalangga; Patkamla Lamaru; Patkamla Coebang; Patkamla Pelambong; Patkamla Pulau Sebesi; Patkamla Karimun; Patkamla Gebang; Patkamla Pulau Pagerungan; Patkamla Pulau Semau Patkamla Pulau Yapen; Patkamla Pulau Langkai; Patkamla Kastela; Patkamla Santiago; Patkamla Binanga; Patkamla Balaroa; Patkamla Gorar; Patkamla Wasur; Patkamla Posa; Patkamla Yapero; Patkamla Jefman KAL Kilat; KAL Guntur; KAL Angin; KAL Guruh; KAL Tornado	Indonesia	Combat Boat-18m Fast Assault-craft built by PT Tesco Indomaritim, PT Palindo Marine, PT Citra Shipyard & PT Infinity Global Mandiri. KAL Kilat, KAL Guntur, KAL Angin, KAL Guruh & KAL Tornado were built by PT Infinity Global Mandiri and used by Kopaska special forces group, special boat unit of the 1st, 2nd & 3rd fleet respectively. In active service.
Samadar class		Patrol Boat	Patkamla Samadar; Patkamla Sadarin; Patkamla Salmaneti; Patkamla Sawangi; Patkamla Sasila; Patkamla Sabola	Australia	16 meters boat part of Carpentaria-class inshore patrol vessel purchased as a grant from Australia in 1976. In active service.
Pulau Ismoyo class	Patkamla Pulau Ismoyo	Patrol Boat	Patkamla Pulau Ismoyo; Patkamla Minca; Patkamla Pulau Sugi	Indonesia	12 meter boat built by PT. Rizquna Energy Persada in 2017.
Pulau Ambo class		Patrol Boat	Patkamla Pulau Ambo; Patkamla Pulau Kabaruan; Patkamla Pulau Doom	Indonesia	12 meter boat built by PT. Borneo Sukses Makmur in 2017.
X-38 Combat Cat class		Fast Assault-craft/Patrol Boat	Patkamla Catamaran; Patkamla Catamaran; Patkamla Catamaran; Patkamla Catamaran; Patkamla Catamaran; Patkamla Catamaran; Patkamla Catamaran; Patkamla Catamaran; Patkamla Catamaran; Patkamla Catamaran; Patkamla Catamaran; Patkamla Catamaran KAL Halilintar; KAL Trisula; KAL Kalandah	Indonesia	12 meter catamaran boat made of CRP built by PT. Lundin Industry Invest listed as X-38 Combat Cat. KAL Halilintar were used by Kopaska special forces group, special boat unit of the 2nd fleet. This class of boat has KAL/Patkamla hull numbering scheme but doesn't have their own designation, often referred simply as Patkamla Combat Boat or Patkamla Catamaran in official setting. At least 12 unit of Combat Boat X-38 Catamaran has been ordered since 2007.
Pintar class	KAL Pintar II-6-57	Multipurpose Patrol Boat	KAL Pintar (ex-KAL Pintar Mandiri I); KAL Pintar (ex-KAL Pintar BNI I); KAL Pintar (ex-KAL Pintar BRI I)	Indonesia	15 meters boat made of fiberglass. Given as a grant from Solidaritas Istri Kabinet Indonesia Bersatu (SIKIB) in 2013 as library boats. Operated by Lantamal Tanjung Pinang, Lantamal Makassar and Lantamal Jayapura respectively. Used as multipurpose boat in navy service including public library, patrol duty, also as vaccination center and floating ambulance during COVID-19 pandemic.
Nirwana class		Multipurpose Patrol Boat	KAL Nirwana-I KAL Nirwana-II; KAL Nirwana-III	Indonesia	15 meters boat used as multipurpose boat under the Military Sealift Command (Kolinlamil).

== Minesweeper fleet ==
Minesweeper ships are named after every island beginning with the letter "R" and "F" and hull numbers beginning with 7.

Class	Picture	Type	Ships	Origin	Note
Mine countermeasure vessel (8 in active service)
Pulau Fani class	KRI Pulau Fani 731 Indonesia	Mine countermeasures vessel	KRI Pulau Fani (731); KRI Pulau Fanildo (732)	Germany	In active service. Ordered from Abeking & Rasmussen, Germany, based on modified Frankenthal-class minehunter design.
Pulau Rengat class		Mine countermeasures vessel	KRI Pulau Rengat (711); KRI Pulau Rupat (712)	Netherlands	In active service. Taken over from Royal Netherlands Navy orders (previously intended to be named Willemstad (M864) & Vlaardingen (M863)).
Pulau Rote class		Minehunter	KRI Pulau Raas (722); KRI Pulau Rimau (724); KRI Pulau Rusa (726); KRI Pulau Rangsang (727) KRI Kelabang (826); KRI Kala Hitam (828)	East Germany	In active service. ex-Kondor II-class minesweepers. KRI Kala Hitam (828) and KRI Kelabang (826) were converted into patrol duty vessels due to minehunting equipment failures. KRI Pulau Rote (721), KRI Pulau Rempang (729) and KRI Pulau Romang (723) have been decommissioned.

== Support fleet ==
Support ships start with the hull number 9. Hospital ships are named after national hero-doctors, training ships are named after mythical figures, research ships are named after star constellations, oil replenishment ships are named after cities, and tugs are named after volcanoes.

Class	Picture	Type	Ships	Origin	Note
Hospital Ship (3 in active service)
Sudirohusodo class		Hospital Assistance Ship	KRI dr. Wahidin Sudirohusodo (991); KRI dr. Radjiman Wedyodiningrat (992)	Indonesia	In active service. Derived from Semarang-class LPD design without well deck and rear ramp facilities, to be used as purpose built hospital ship Projected to replace KRI Semarang role as a provisional hospital ship.
Tanjung Dalpele class	KRI dr. Soeharso	Hospital Assistance Ship	KRI dr. Soeharso (990)	South Korea	In active service. ex-KRI Tanjung Dalpele (972) LPD.
Training Ship (Note: KRI Ki Hajar Dewantara (364) decommissioned on August 16, 2019.) (9 in active service)
Bima Suci class	KRI Bima Suci - Barque	Sail Training Barque	KRI Bima Suci	Spain	Gradually replacing KRI Dewaruci as Navy cadet training ship.
Dewaruci class		Sail Training Barquentine	KRI Dewaruci	Germany	In active service. Limited use for cadet training on domestic waters only.
Arung Samudera class	KRI Arung Samudera	Sail Training Schooner	KRI Arung Samudera	New Zealand	In active service. Used in tall ship races and events around the world. ex-Adventure.
Kadet class	KAL Taruna V (KAL-V.05) KAL Bawean I-02	Training Boats	KAL Kadet-2 KAL Kadet-3 KAL Kadet-5 KAL Kadet-6; KAL Kadet-7 KAL Kadet-8	Indonesia	In active service. Navy's Naval Academy (Akademi Angkatan Laut) cadets training boats for basic field and navigation training. Kadet-2 - PC-28m; Kadet-3 - PC-12m; Kadet-5 - PC-40m boats built by Fasharkan TNI AL Jakarta in 2009. Kadet-6 & 7 - PC-45m boats built by PT. Karimun Anugrah Sejati. Kadet-8 - PC-32m Ex- KAL Bawean Patrol Boat.
Hydrographic and Oceanographic Research Vessel (Note: Other than ships that were listed below, Pushidrosal also took command of other ship including KRI Pulau Romang (723), KRI Leuser (924), and KAL Antares) (7 in active service)
Canopus class		Hydrographic and Oceanographic Research Vessel	KRI Canopus (936)	Indonesia; Germany	In active service. Known locally as BHO-105M (Bantu Hidro-Oseanografi or Hydro-Oceanography Support 105M). Built by PT. Palindo Marine in collaboration with Abeking & Rasmussen. First steel cut on 15 September 2023. Keel laid on 14 December 2023. Lead ship launched on 24 September 2024.
Rigel class		Hydrographic and Oceanographic Research Vessel	KRI Rigel (933); KRI Spica (934)	France	In active service.
Dewa Kembar class		Hydrographic and Oceanographic Research Vessel	KRI Dewa Kembar (932)	United Kingdom	In active service. ex-HMS Hydra (A144).
Pollux class		Hydrographic and Oceanographic Research Vessel	KRI Pollux (935)	Indonesia	In active service. Built by PT. Karimun Anugrah Sejati. Based on modified PC-40m-class design.
Aries class		Hydrographic and Oceanographic Research Vessel	KAL Aries (0–01–01)	Soviet Union	In active service. PO-2-class Cutter (Project 376) commissioned in 1964.
Vega class		Hydrographic and Oceanographic Research Vessel	KAL Vega (0–01–02)	Indonesia	In active service. 21m boats made of fiberglass by Fasharkan TNI AL Jakarta in 2008.
Dry Cargo Support Ship (1 in active service)
Talaud class		Dry Cargo Support Ship	KRI Teluk Mentawai (959)	Hungary	In active service. Has a cargo capacity of 875 long tons.
Replenishment Oiler (5 in active service)
Tarakan class		Tanker	KRI Tarakan (905) KRI Bontang (907); KRI Balongan (908)	Indonesia	In active service. KRI Balongan (908) launched on September 2, 2022. On September 5, Navy welcomed KRI Balongan (908). Can carry up to 5,000 m^{3} of Fuel.
Arun class	KRI Arun 903	Fleet Tanker	KRI Arun (903)	United Kingdom	In active service. ex-RFA Green Rover (A268) Can carry up to 7,460 m^{3} of Fuel.
Sungai Gerong class		Small Tanker	KRI Sungai Gerong (906)	Yugoslavia	In active service.
Troop Transport Ship (Note: KRI Karang Banteng (983) and KRI Karang Galang (984) were decommissioned in 2014 and 2008. Both of this ships were retired to reduce the operational cost of the Indonesian Navy. KRI Karang Banteng sunk in 2014 after used as target ship for 2 Exocet missiles and 2 C-802 Missiles. KRI Karang Galang sunk in 2008 after used as target ship for C-802 missile. KRI Karang Unarang (985) was transferred to Sangihe region to serve as commercial ship. KRI Tanjung Oisina (972) and KRI Tanjung Fatagar (974) were decommissioned in 2005 and 2014 respectively and both were sold for scrap. KRI Tanjung Nusanive (973) decommissioned on 24 January 2020. KRI Karang Tekok (982) decommissioned on 16 April 2021.) (2 in active service)
Tanjung Kambani class		Troop Transport	KRI Tanjung Kambani (971)	Japan	In active service. ex-Dong Yang Express Ferry No.6 (ja)
Karang Pilang class		Troop Transport	KRI Karang Pilang (981)	Germany	In active service. ex-KFC Ambulu (Note: KFC : Kapal Feri Cepat or Fast/High-speed Ferry)
Fleet Tugs (Note: KRI Rakata (922), ex-USS Menominee (AT-73), an ocean tugboat was decommissioned in 2003. The ship later sunk as missiles and torpedoes target during firing exercise in 2004. The ship received multiple direct hit from anti-ship missile and SUT Torpedo) (16 in active service)
Soputan class		Ocean-going tugboat	KRI Soputan (923) KRI Leuser (924)	South Korea; Indonesia	In active service.
Galunggung class		Coastal tugboat	TD Galunggung; TD Anjasmoro; TD Malabar	Indonesia	29 m coastal tug built by PT. PAL in 2013 & 2016. In active service.
Merbabu class		Coastal tugboat	TD Merbabu; TD Merapi	Indonesia	27 m coastal tug built by PT. DKB in 1992. In active service.
Lawu class		Coastal tugboat	TD Lawu	Indonesia	25 m coastal tug built by PT. Jalakaca Mitraguna in 2010. In active service.
Bromo class		Coastal tugboat	TD Bromo; TD Tambora	Japan	23 m Coastal tug built by Hitachi Zosen Mukashishima Shipyard in 1961. In active service.
Wilis class		Coastal tugboat	TD Wilis	Indonesia	Coastal tug built in 1982. In active service.
Tinombala class		Coastal tugboat	TD Tinombala	Indonesia	Coastal tug built in 2004. In active service.
Umsini class		Coastal tugboat	TD Umsini; TD Irau; TD Ranai	Indonesia	30 m Harbor tug built by PT. Noahtu Shipyard in 2023. In active service.
Daik class		Coastal tugboat	TD Daik	Indonesia	30m Harbor tug built by PT. Dok Bahari Nusantara in 2024. In active service.
Hovercraft (Note: Indonesian Navy operate several locally produced hovercraft since 2005 and bear the name of Hovercraft Angkatan Laut (Navy Hovercraft) or HAL followed by their hull numbers. They mainly served as troop or VIP transport during ship-to-shore landing exercise with capacity of 20 passenger. Some of the vessel are also known to be deployed aboard KRI Dr. Soeharso.) (5 in active service)
		Hovercraft	HAL-01; HAL-02; HAL-03; HAL-04; HAL-05	Indonesia	In active service
Motor Yacht (Note: Indonesian Navy commissioned a 30 meters long, locally built yacht since 2007 for VVIP transport and accommodation named KAL Yudhistira. The vessel mainly used as VVIP transport for President or Navy's Chief of Staff during naval exercise or fleet review.) (2 in active service)
		Motor Yacht	KAL Antasena	Indonesia	In active service
		Motor Yacht	KAL Yudhistira	Indonesia	In active service
Submarine Rescue Vessel (3 on order)
Tbd		Submarine Rescue Ship	Tbd	Indonesia; United Kingdom	SRS Mothership, to be built by BTI Defence. On order
Tbd		DSRV	Tbd	United Kingdom	SMP SRV-F Mk3 On order.
Tbd		DSRV	Tbd	United Kingdom	FET LR600 SRV On order.

== Weapon systems ==
Name	Picture	Origin	Type	Version	Used by	Notes
Leonardo OTO 127/64 LW		Italy	Dual-purpose gun	OTO 127/64 LW 127 mm/64 - VULCANO System	Brawijaya-class Frigate	127 mm × 835 mm R cartridges
Bofors 120 mm L/46	Karjala 120 mm keulatykki Forum Marinum 4	Sweden	Dual-purpose gun	Bofors 120 mm/46 TAK120	Fatahillah-class Corvette	120 mm × 616 mm R cartridges
OTO Melara 76 mm	INS Kadmatt - Oto Melara SRGM Front View	Italy	Dual-purpose gun	76 mm/62 Compact; 76 mm/62 Super Rapid; 76 mm/62 Strales Sovraponte	Compact: Ahmad Yani-class Frigate; Super Rapid: Martadinata-class Frigate; Diponegoro-class Corvette; Bung Tomo-class Corvette; Raja Haji Fisabilillah-class OPV; Strales Sovraponte: Brawijaya-class Frigate	76.2 mm × 636 mm R cartridges
Bofors SAK 57 mm	Hanko 57 mm Bofors Mk3 Lippujuhlan päivä 2013	Sweden	Dual-purpose gun	Bofors SAK 57 mm/70 Mark 1; Bofors SAK 57 mm/70 Mark 2; Bofors SAK 57 mm/70 Mark 3	Mark 1: Bung Karno-class Corvette; Mandau-class FAC-M; Mark 2: Singa-class FAC-T; Pandrong-class FPB; Todak-class FPB/FAC-M; Mark 3: Sampari-class FAC-M	57 mm × 438 mm R cartridges
АК-725	DN-SC-94-00870-part	Soviet Union	Dual-purpose gun	AK-725 57 mm/75 (ZIF-72)	Kapitan Pattimura-class Corvette	57 mm × 348 mm SR cartridges
AU-220M Baikal	Vice President Labuan Bajo Visit On KRI Sampari	Russia	RCWS	Burevestnik AU-220M 2A91-01 57 mm/75 Self-contained lightweight naval artillery mount	Sampari-class FAC-M	57 mm × 348 mm SR cartridges
Bofors 40 mm	Bofors 40 mm L70 gun aboard the Frigate ROCN Wu Chang (PFG-1207) 20130504	Sweden; United Kingdom; Italy	Dual-purpose gun	L/60: British 40 mm QF Mark VII mounting; L/70: Bofors SAK-40/L70-315; Bofors SAK-40/L70-350AFD; Bofors SAK-40/L70-520; Bofors SAK-40/L70-600 (Trinity upgrade kit); OTO Breda 40 mm L70 Type 58 MEL (Marine Einzellafette)	L/60: 40 mm QF Mark VII Single gun mounting: Sibarau-class PB; L/70: SAK-40/L70-315: Makassar-class LPD; Kakap-class FPB; Soputan-class Ocean-going Tugboat; Sibarau-class PB (865); Arun-class Fleet Tanker; SAK-40/L70-350AFD: Fatahillah-class Corvette; Mandau-class FAC-M; SAK-40/L70-520: Teluk Semangka-class LST(515); Teluk Bintuni-class LST; SAK-40/L70-600 (Trinity upgrade kit): Todak-class FPB/FAC-M; Singa-class FAC-T; Pandrong-class FPB; OTO Breda 40 mm L70 Type 58 MEL: Teluk Semangka-class LST (516 & 517)	L/60: 40 mm × 311 mm R cartridges L/70: 40 mm × 364 mm R cartridges
Leonardo OTO Marlin 40		Italy	Dual-purpose gun	OTO Marlin 40 40 mm/70 ILOS; OTO Marlin 40 40 mm/70 RC	ILOS: Bung Karno-class Corvette; Teluk Bintuni-class LST; Dorang-class PB; RC: Belati-class FAC-M	40 mm × 364 mm R cartridges
DARDO		Italy	Dual-purpose gun	DARDO; OTO Twin 40L70 Compact 40 mm/70 - Type A (Stealth Cupola)	DARDO: Sriwijaya-class Aircraft Carrier; OTO Twin 40L70 Compact: Raja Haji Fisabilillah-class OPV; Makassar-class LPD; Semarang-class LPD	40 mm × 364 mm R cartridges
Larsen & Toubro Teevra 40		India	Dual-purpose gun	Teevra 40 40 mm/70 naval gun system	Dorang-class PB	40 mm × 364 mm R cartridges
M1939 37 mm	2-barrel Sea Canon	Soviet Union	Anti-aircraft Gun	M1939: 70-K Single gun 37 mm/67 naval mount; V-11 Twin gun 37 mm/67 naval mount	70-K: Multatuli-class Command Ship; Teluk Gilimanuk-class LST; Teluk Langsa-class LST; Sungai Gerong-class Small Tanker; V-11: Multatuli-class Command Ship; Teluk Gilimanuk-class LST	37 mm × 252 mm SR cartridges
Oerlikon Millennium 35 mm Naval Gun	35 mm Oerlikon Millenium on Absalon	Switzerland	CIWS	Oerlikon KDG Millennium GDM-008 35 mm/1000 (79 caliber) naval gun	Martadinata-class Frigate	35 mm × 228 mm cartridges
AK-230	Forward AK-230, Keihässalmi	Soviet Union	Dual-purpose gun	AK-230 30 mm/63 twin gun	Kapitan Pattimura-class Corvette	30 mm × 210 mm B cartridges
Type 730	PNS Saif - Type 730 CIWS	China	CIWS	Type 730B 7-barrel 30 mm/76	Kapitan Pattimura-class Corvette	H/PJ-12B 30 mm × 173 mm cartridges
Leonardo OTO Marlin - WS 30 mm	Alh-08-09-sint-maarten-foto-2 bijgesneden	Italy	RCWS	OTO Marlin - WS Mk44 Bushmaster II 30 mm/80 COAX - Dual feed	Pari-class PB (Batch-2); Clurit-class FAC-M	30 mm × 173 mm cartridges
MSI-DS SEAHAWK DS A1 30 mm	KAL Mamuju Open Ship	United Kingdom	RCWS	SEAHAWK DS30M A1 Mk44 Bushmaster II 30 mm/80 - Dual feed	Mamuju-class PB	30 mm × 173 mm cartridges
MSI-DS SEAHAWK LW A1 30 mm		United Kingdom	RCWS	SEAHAWK LW30M A1 Mk44 Bushmaster II 30 mm/80 - Dual feed	Clurit-class FAC-M; Pari-class PB (Batch-1); Pollux-class MPRV	30 mm × 173 mm cartridges
Cockerill C3000 Series 30 mm Turret		Belgium	RCWS	Cockerill 3030 Mk44 Bushmaster II 30 mm/80 - Unmanned Turret	Antasena-class FAC	30 mm × 173 mm cartridges
MSI DS-30B 30 mm	HMS Blyth Rouen 2013 (4)	United Kingdom	RCWS	DS-30B Oerlikon KCB 30 mm/75 REMSIG	Bung Tomo-class Corvette	30 mm × 170 mm cartridges
Oerlikon/BMARC GCM-A03 30 mm	HMS Battleaxe NTW 3 93 6	United Kingdom	RCWS	GCM-A03-2 Oerlikon KCB 30 mm/75 twin gun	Badau-class PB	30 mm × 170 mm cartridges
H/PJ-13	NG-18 CIWS	China	CIWS	NG-18 6-barrel 30 mm/54	Clurit-class FAC-M; Sampari-class FAC-M	Chinese version of AK-630 (H/PJ-13) 30 mm × 165 mm cartridges
2M-3 25 mm	2м-3 универсальное спаренное 25мм орудие	Soviet Union	Anti-aircraft Gun	2M-3 25 mm/79 twin gun	Pulau Rote-class Minesweeper; Krait-class PB; Boa-class PB; Teluk Gilimanuk-class LST; Tanjung Kambani-class Troop Transport	25 mm × 218 mm cartridges
Leonardo SINGLE 25 mm KBA	OTO KBA	Italy	RCWS	OTO SINGLE 25mm KBA Oerlikon KBA 25 mm/80 - Unmanned Mounting	Brawijaya-class Frigate	25 mm × 137 mm cartridges
Denel Land Systems GI-2	DENEL GI-2	South Africa	Autocannon	Denel Land Systems GI-2 20 mm/93	Kapitan Pattimura-class Corvette; Clurit-class FAC-M; Diponegoro-class Corvette; Rigel-class MPRV	20 mm x 139 mm cartridges
Rheinmetall Rh-202	Rheinmetall Rh202 naval mount	Germany	Autocannon	Mark 20 Rh-202 20 mm/65 Type-3 Rheinmetall S20 naval gun mount - Single feed	Ahmad Yani-class Frigate; Mandau-class FAC-M; Singa-class FAC-T; Pandrong-class FPB; Pulau Rengat-class Minehunter; Todak-class FPB/FAC-M; Fatahillah-class Corvette; Karang Pilang-class Troop Transport; Teluk Semangka-class LST; Arun-class Fleet Tanker; KAL-28m-class PB	20 mm × 139 mm cartridges
Rheinmetall Air Defense Oerlikon Searanger 20		Germany	RCWS	Searanger 20 Oerlikon KAE 20 mm/85 Remote Controlled Gun Station	Canopus-class MPRV; Pulau Fani-class MCMV	20 mm × 128 mm cartridges
Oerlikon 20 mm	Maille-Breze 20 mm autocannon-IMG 4097	Switzerland	Anti-aircraft Gun	Oerlikon 20 mm/70 on various Single naval gun mount	Boa-class PB; Cucut-class PB; KAL-28M-class PB; Kapitan Pattimura-class Corvette; Tanjung Kambani-class Troop Transport; Soputan-class Ocean-going Tugboat; Tanjung Dalpele-class Hospital Ship	20 mm × 110 mm RB cartridges
Yugoimport-SDPR M71/08	Yugoimport-SDPR M71 cannon	Serbia	Autocannon	M71/08 Zastava 20/1mm M55 20 mm/70 Naval AD weapon system	Sriwijaya-class Aircraft Carrier; Sampari-class FAC-M; Semarang-class LPD; Tarakan-class Tanker; Diponegoro-class Corvettes; Fatahillah-class Corvette; Kapitan Pattimura-class Corvette; Bung Karno-class Corvette; Klewang-class FAC-M; KAL-28m-class PB	20 mm x 110 mm cartridges
AEI Systems AE20-NM-2		United Kingdom	Autocannon	AE20-NM-2 AEI-HS804 20 mm/70 Naval Weapon Mount	Belati-class FAC-M	20 mm x 110 mm cartridges
Denel Land Systems GA-1	KRI Banda Aceh auto cannon Denel GA-1	South Africa	Autocannon	Denel Land Systems GA-1 20 mm/55	Martadinata-class Frigate; Yudhistira-class Presidential Yacht; Makassar-class LPD; Sinabang-class PB; Boa-class PB; Kapitan Pattimura-class Corvette; Pari-class PB (Batch-2)	20 mm x 82 mm cartridges
2M-1 12.7 mm	2M-1 Gdynia 5	Soviet Union	Anti-aircraft Gun	2M-1 DShK 1938/46 12.7 mm/79 twin gun naval mount	Sungai Gerong-class Small Tanker; Dewa Kembar-class MPRV; Talaud-class Cargo Ship	12.7 mm x 108 mm cartridges
Anti-ship missiles
P-800 Onyx	3M55 Yakhont Onyx SS-N-26 Armia 2018	Russia	Anti-Ship Missile (AShM)	P-800 Yakhont	Ahmad Yani-class Frigate	
MBDA Exocet	EXOCET MM 40 BLOCK 3	France	Anti-Ship Missile (AShM)	MM38 Exocet; MM40 Exocet Block 2; MM40 Exocet Block 3	MM38: Fatahillah-class Corvette; Mandau-class FAC-M; MM40 Block 2: Diponegoro-class Corvette; Bung Tomo-class Corvette; MM40 Block 3: Martadinata-class Frigate; Diponegoro-class Corvette; Bung Tomo-class Corvette; Sampari-class FAC-M	
ATMACA	Missile by Roketsan at Teknofest 2023	Turkey	Anti-Ship Missile (AShM)	ATMACA	Belati-class FAC-M	
C-802	C802A Medium to Long Range Anti-Ship Missile	China	Anti-Ship Missile (AShM)	C-802	Ahmad Yani-class Frigate; Todak-class FPB/FAC-M	
C-705	C-705 missile of Indonesian Navy at Batuporon naval base	China	Anti-Ship Missile (AShM)	C-705	Clurit-class FAC-M; Sampari-class FAC-M	
Surface-to-air missiles
MBDA Mistral	MBDA Mistral - IDET 2017	France	Surface-to-Air Missile (SAM)	MBDA Mistral SIMBAD; MBDA Mistral TETRAL	SIMBAD: Sriwijaya-class Aircraft Carrier; Ahmad Yani-class Frigate; TETRAL: Diponegoro-class Corvette	Both the original Mistral & Mistral 2 version were acquired.
MBDA MICA	MICA P6230072	France	Surface-to-Air Missile (SAM)	MBDA VL MICA-M	Martadinata-class Frigate; Bung Tomo-class Corvette	
MBDA Sea Wolf	BAC Sea Wolf GWS-26 (28135056057)	United Kingdom	Surface-to-Air Missile (SAM)	GWS-26 Vertically Launched Sea Wolf (VLSW)	Bung Tomo-class Corvette	VLS modules fitted on the Bung Tomo-class Corvettes, no known live missile were ever purchased. To be replaced by VL-MICA.
Selenia Aspide		Italy	Surface-to-Air Missile (SAM)	Albatros Mk. 2	Sriwijaya-class Aircraft Carrier	2 × Octuple launcher fitted on KRI Sriwijaya, missile status unkown.
SA-N-5 Grail	SA-7	Soviet Union	Surface-to-Air Missile (SAM)	9K32M Strela-2M (AL-1M)	Kapitan Pattimura-class Corvette	Locally upgraded and known as AL-1M, features new pedestal mounting, proximity fuse and replacement propellant.
Torpedoes
AEG SUT		Germany; Indonesia	Heavyweight torpedo	AEG SUT 264 Mod 0 – 533 mm	Cakra-class Submarine; Singa-class FAC-T	Licensed production by PT Dirgantara Indonesia.
WASS Black Shark	KRI Alugoro Torpedo Training	Italy	Heavyweight torpedo	Black Shark – 533 mm	Nagapasa-class	
WASS A244/S	KRI REM 331 Torpedo Firing Exercise	Italy	Lightweight torpedo	A244/S Mod.3 – 324 mm	Diponegoro-class Corvette; Bung Tomo-class Corvette; Martadinata-class Frigate	
Mark 46 torpedo	Mark 46 torpedo launched by DD-980 1996	United States	Lightweight torpedo	Mark 46 Mod 2 – 324 mm	Ahmad Yani-class Frigate; Fatahillah-class Corvette; Kapitan Pattimura-class Corvette	
Anti-submarine weaponry
Bofors SR-375A Twin-tube Rocket Launcher	F Independência (F-44) gun and ASW rocket launcher	Sweden	ASW rocket	Bofors Nelli ASW rocket – 375 mm; Bofors Erika ASW rocket – 375 mm	Fatahillah-class Corvette	
RBU-6000	RBU-6000 "Smerch-2" anti-submarine rocket launcher(right front view) mounted on Russian Navy destroyer Admiral Tributs(BPK-564) at JMSDF Maizuru Naval Base January 21, 2016 01	Soviet Union	ASW rocket	RBU-6000 Smerch-2 RGB-60 – 213 mm; RBU-6000 Smerch-2 90R – 213 mm	Kapitan Pattimura-class Corvette	

== Future projects ==
=== Frigates ===
==== Balaputradewa class ====
On April 30, 2020, The Indonesian Ministry of Defence has signed a preamble contract that paves the way for the country to procure Iver Huitfeldt-class frigate from Denmark.

On September 16, 2021, during Defense and Security Equipment International (DSEI) 2021 event in London, Babcock said it has secured the first export contract for its Arrowhead 140 (AH140) frigate. Indonesian shipbuilder PT. PAL will implement the Arrowhead 140 design on a prior contract it secured from MoD and related parties on April 30, 2020, for two Iver Huitfeldt class-variant frigates.

During IndoDefence Expo & Forum 2022, PT. PAL and HAVELSAN signed an MoU on cooperation in the field of combat systems for frigates. The collaboration with HAVELSAN will focus on providing a Combat Management System (CMS) and integration of weapons to be used on Indonesian Frigates program.

The first steel-cutting for the first frigate (construction number W000304) was conducted on 9 December 2022, while the progress of the second frigate (construction number W000305) remains unclear. The first and second frigate should be delivered in 57 months and 69 months, respectively, from the effective contract date on 24 May 2021.

Turkey's HAVELSAN during Langkawi International Maritime and Aerospace (LIMA) Exhibition 2023 in Malaysia announced that they will equip the Indonesian Navy's new Arrowhead 140 frigates with its Advent combat management system (CMS).

Keel-laying ceremony for the first Arrowhead 140 frigate, now locally known as 'Red White' (Merah Putih) frigate was held on 25 August 2023 at PT. PAL's facilities in Surabaya. The ‘Red White' frigates will each displace about 5,996 tonnes at full load and have an overall length of 140 m. Turkish defence electronics company HAVELSAN has been selected to supply its Advent combat management system (CMS) for both warships. The suite of weapons that has been proposed for Indonesian requirements include 12-cell vertical launching system (VLS) for medium-range surface-to-air missiles (SAMs), a separate 12-cell VLS for long-range SAMs, a 16-cell VLS for surface-to-surface missiles, two 76 mm naval guns, and a 35 mm close-in weapon system (CIWS).

The first steel-cutting for the second Red White frigate were held by PT. PAL on 6 June 2024 at its facility in East Java. The second ship was laid down on 15 November 2024, five months earlier from the planned date of March 2025.

==== Brawijaya class ====
On 28 March 2024, Italian shipbuilder Fincantieri announced that it has signed a 1.18-billion-euro contract for two units of multirole offshore patrol ships (Pattugliatore Polivalente d'Altura: PPA) with the Indonesian Ministry of Defense (MoD). The two PPA platforms to be delivered to the Indonesian Navy are the two PPAs in the PPA LIGHT+ (Light Plus) configuration with anti-air and anti-surface warfare capabilities, namely the 5th and 6th vessels of the PPA class; Marcantonio Colonna (P433) and Ruggiero di Lauria (P435), which are currently under different stage of outfitting and trials at Fincantieri Muggiano shipyard.

The Indonesian government also planned to named the two vessels as KRI Brawijaya (320) and KRI Prabu Siliwangi (321). The vessels were officially renamed on 29 January 2025.

=== Corvettes ===
==== Bung Tomo class ====
In March 2020, Indonesia's defense ministry formally launched the modernization, signing an agreement with lead contractor, PT. Len, and Thales, to upgrade KRI Usman Harun (359) with Thales's latest-generation TACTICOS Combat Management System, SMART-S Mk2 3D and STIR 1.2 EO Mk2 radars, a Vigile Mk2 ESM, and two new tactical data links – Link Y Mk2 and a tactical data link that will be wholly delivered by PT. Len. Existing weaponry will also be fully integrated, and a new VL MICA surface-to-air missile system added.

In December 2021, OSI Maritime Systems (OSI) announced that it has been contracted by PT. Len Industri (Persero), Indonesia, for an Integrated Navigation System featuring the integration of new and legacy navigation sensors, with provisions to connect to the Combat Management System (CMS) for the Mid-Life Modernisation (MLM) of Bung Tomo-Class Multi-Role Light Frigate (MRLF), KRI Usman Harun (359).

==== Diponegoro class ====
On 4 November 2022, Thales signed a contract with PT. Len to undertake the refurbishment of the integrated mission systems for four Diponegoro-class ships. The contract was signed by Mr. Bobby Rasyidin, President Director for PT. Len Industri and Mr. Erik-Jan Raatgerink, Sales Director, Thales Netherlands during IndoDefence Expo & Forum. The corvettes will be updated with Thales TACTICOS Baseline 2 combat management system (CMS) and Thales Naval Smarter (NS) NS50 radar system.

==== Bung Karno class ====
During the commissioning ceremony of KRI Bung Karno on 1 June 2023, the Chief of Staff of the Navy Admiral Muhammad Ali stated that a sister ship to Bung Karno was planned to be built. The unnamed second ship would have better weaponries than Bung Karno. On 1 January 2024, PT. Karimun Anugrah Sejati performs first steel cutting and keel laying ceremony for second ship of Bung Karno-class corvette.

=== Offshore Patrol Vessels ===
==== Raja Haji Fisabilillah class ====
On 26 August 2021, Indonesian shipbuilder PT. Daya Radar Utama (DRU) cut steel for two Offshore Patrol Vessels (OPV) for the Indonesian Navy. In November 2021, the company lays keel for the two OPVs with ceremony at their yard in Bandar Lampung. The vessels are to be fitted with HAVELSAN Advent Combat Management System, Elettronica Radar Electronic Counter-Measures System and Atmaca Anti-Ship Missile. First ship launched on 18 September 2024. The second ship, followed two days later on the 20 September 2024.

=== Fast Missile Boats ===
==== Sampari class ====
On 2021, PT. Tesco Indomaritim received contract to build water-jet-propelled variant of the KCR-60m fast attack craft (FAC) for the Indonesian Navy. The vessel main propulsion consists of a single fixed pitch propeller and two water-jets, contrasting from the existing KCR-60m vessels (Sampari-class) which instead are each only propelled by two fixed pitch propellers. The vessel was demonstrated for the first time during inauguration of KRI dr. Wahidin Sudirohusodo (991) on 4 November 2022. During IndoDefence Expo & Forum 2022, HAVELSAN announce that they signed a contract to provide ADVENT Combat Management System (CMS) for three KCR-60m ship produced by PT. Tesco Indomaritim.

On 2 April 2024, Doen WaterJets posted on their LinkedIn update page about supplying a DJ450B-DT waterjet to PT. Palindo Marine, which is commissioned by the Indonesian MoD to design and construct the new generation 68m fast attack craft for the Indonesian Navy (TNI AL). On 12 June 2024, PT. Palindo Marine perform keel laying ceremony for a single unit of 60m Fast Attack Craft, KCR-60m variant, equipped with waterjet for the Indonesian navy.

=== Minesweepers ===
==== Pulau Rengat class ====
As part of the modernisation of the Indonesian Navy's Minehunters of the Pulau Rengat-class, HENSOLDT Nexeya France has been awarded a multi-million Euro contract from the Indonesian shipyard integrator PT. Noahtu Shipyard (used to be known as PT. Daya Radar Utama/DRU). It covers the integration of the LYNCEA Combat Management System (CMS) and the installation of new sensors and equipment, including HENSOLDT UK's Integrated Navigation Bridge System (INBS). HENSOLDT Nexeya France will be in charge of ship integration, validation (HAT) and sea trials (SAT) of the multi-console CMS connected to the navigation equipment and to all the sensors. These include SharpEye MK11 and MK7 radars, LTR 400 IFF transponder and Tactical Data Link, as well as sonar and unmanned underwater vehicles dedicated to mine hunting.

=== Hydrographic and Oceanographic Research Vessels ===
==== BHO-105M ====
On 15 September 2023, PT. Palindo Marine held first steel cutting ceremony for one BHO (Bantu Hidro-Oseanografi) 105m ship. The procurement of this ship is the result of a contract between Indonesia Ministry of Defense and Abeking & Rasmussen (A&R), in December 2022. In the implementation of the ship construction, Abeking & Rasmussen collaborated with PT. Palindo Marine in Batam as part of the transfer of technology (ToT) scheme for the construction of the research vessels and also as an effort to increase the usage of local content on the program.

On 14 December 2023, PT. Palindo Marine on its facility in Batam in cooperation with German shipyards, Abeking & Rasmussen and FASSMER held keel-laying ceremony for BHO-105m vessel (yard number 6515), TNI AL's future 105-metre ocean-going hydro-oceanographic auxiliary ship known as Bantu Hidro-Oseanogrvices. Abeking & Rasmussen stated that once the pre-outfitted hull is completed, the ship will be sent to Weser River in Germany for final outfitting. The ship will have a maximum top speed of 16 knots, accommodate 90 crew, and be equipped with various devices, including Autonomous Mine Detector (AUV), Conductivity, Temperature, Depth (CTD) Rosette, Light Detection and Ranging (LiDAR) Drone, Magnetometer, Multibeam Echo sounder, Remotely Operated Vehicle (ROV), Side Scan Sonar, and Seismic Towed Streamer, etc. The vessel were also said to have some submarine rescue capability aside from her main role as the navy's hydro-oceanographic research vessel.

The ship launched on 24 September 2024.

=== Submarine rescue vessel ===
==== SRS Mothership ====
On 12 September 2023, Submarine Manufacturing and Products Ltd (SMP), a UK based manufacturer and supplier of diving and subsea rescue equipment, they will provide its new Submarine Rescue System (SRS) to the Indonesian Navy. The SRS will be hosted on a mothership designed by independent design and engineering consultancy, Houlder and delivered by its Indonesian strategic partner, BTI Defence. The three-year build contract will include the SRS, centered around SMP's new SRV-F Mk3 rescue submersible. The SRV-F Mk3 has been developed as a hybrid system which is capable of deployment both by air and on its mothership. When deployed by air, the rescue submersible can be towed to and from the distressed submarine's location without needing to be recovered to deck, it can also dive to depths of 500m and able to carry up to 50 rescuees at a time.

The custom build of the mothership will take place in region, along with the associated expert training for the Indonesian Navy who will operate the system when it is in service. The mothership is fitted with a suite of support equipment, including a handling system, an advanced Transfer Under Pressure (TUP) system and a dedicated Decompression Chamber, enabling the immediate medical attention and treatment of rescued personnel.

The mothership includes an aft working deck arrangement and a large, dedicated operations room with an attached communications suite, which has a clear view over the working deck to support rescue operations. The design also incorporates multiple small boats for rescue duties and a helipad that takes the appropriate medium-to-large sized rescue helicopters. The ship will have a large permanent hyperbaric chamber and a dedicated 10 berth hospital. Permanent onboard accommodation for up to 90 people with over 30 spare berths available and separate accommodation for rescued personnel, with up to 50 berths. The vessel will feature a dedicated closed hangar with climate control for rescue equipment. This ensures the equipment is protected from the environment and remains in optimal condition. It can also be maintained more easily and ensures crew comfort is maximized whilst conducting rescue tasks, an important consideration for equatorial operations.

=== Submarines ===
==== Scorpène class ====
On 10 February 2022 the Indonesian Minister of Defence Prabowo Subianto and his French counterpart Florence Parly witness the signing of Memorandum of Understanding (MoU) between Kaharuddin Djenod, CEO of PT. PAL and Pierre Eric Pommellet, CEO of Naval Group on cooperation in research and development between PT. PAL and Naval Group regarding the plan to purchase two Scorpène submarines with AIP (Air-independent Propulsion) along with weapons and spare parts as well as training with local production of said submarine on PT. PAL facility in Surabaya, East Java.

On 26 February 2024, Representatives from French shipbuilder Naval Group begin contract negotiations for two lithium-ion batteries-equipped Scorpène Evolved diesel-electric submarines with Indonesian MoD in Jakarta. Under this arrangement, both submarines will be fully built in Surabaya, with construction work on the first boat scheduled to begin 14 months after the contract becomes effective and once funding sources and an initial payment are secured.

On 28 March 2024, Indonesia choose Naval Group and PT. PAL to strengthen the capabilities of the Indonesian Navy with two Scorpène Evolved full lithium-ion battery (LiB) submarines to be built fully in Indonesia's PT. PAL shipyard, through a transfer of technology from Naval Group. Key features of each Scorpène Evolved boats includes an overall length of 72 m and having surface displacement between 1,600 and 2,000 tons. Accommodation for a crew of 31 and will have 6 torpedo tubes and can take up 18 weapon payloads. The submarine will have maximum submerged speed exceeding 20 knots and can attain a maximum diving depth of over 300 m. The vessels also boast an autonomy exceeding 78 days on an 80-day mission and can remain submerged for more than 12 days. The adoption of full lithium-ion technology in the energy system allows for higher energy efficiency, reduced charging time, and increased tactical mobility regardless of the state of charge.

Local Autonomous Submarines / Kapal Selam Otonom (KSOT)

Aside from the Scorpene Class, the Indonesian Navy with PT PAL are also currently developing a local autonomous submarine, known locally as Kapal Selam Otonom (KSOT). The submarines have an endurance of 72 hours, a top speed of 20 knots, and can operate up to 200 km from their control centers through direct radio or satellite links. Furthermore the submarines are planned to use Artificial Intelligence to enhance their autonomous operations.

Currently PT PAL has developed 8 prototypes for testing and further development. The 2nd prototype has successfully fired a drill 324mm torpedo on the 30th of October 2025. The 8th prototype was presented to the public during the 80th Anniversary of the Indonesian Armed Forces parade at Monas, Jakarta. The submarines are planned to come in different variants, from torpedo carrying autonomous submarines, to kamikaze variants.

=== Missiles ===
==== Atmaca ====
On 25 January 2024, Indonesia has awarded a contract to local defense company PT. Republik Defensindo for the acquisition of an initial batch of Atmaca anti-ship guided missiles from Turkey. This contract covers the procurement of 45 missile rounds and associated launcher units and user terminals for the Indonesian Navy. This procurement is part of Indonesian MoD R41 program to repair, repower and refurbish existing class of ship (41 KRI Refurbishment Program). The missiles are scheduled to be installed on several vessels of Fatahillah-class corvettes, Kapitan Pattimura-class corvettes, FPB-57-class FAC/PB and also planned to be integrated on the upcoming Raja Haji Fisabilillah-class offshore patrol vessel.

== Gallery of ships ==
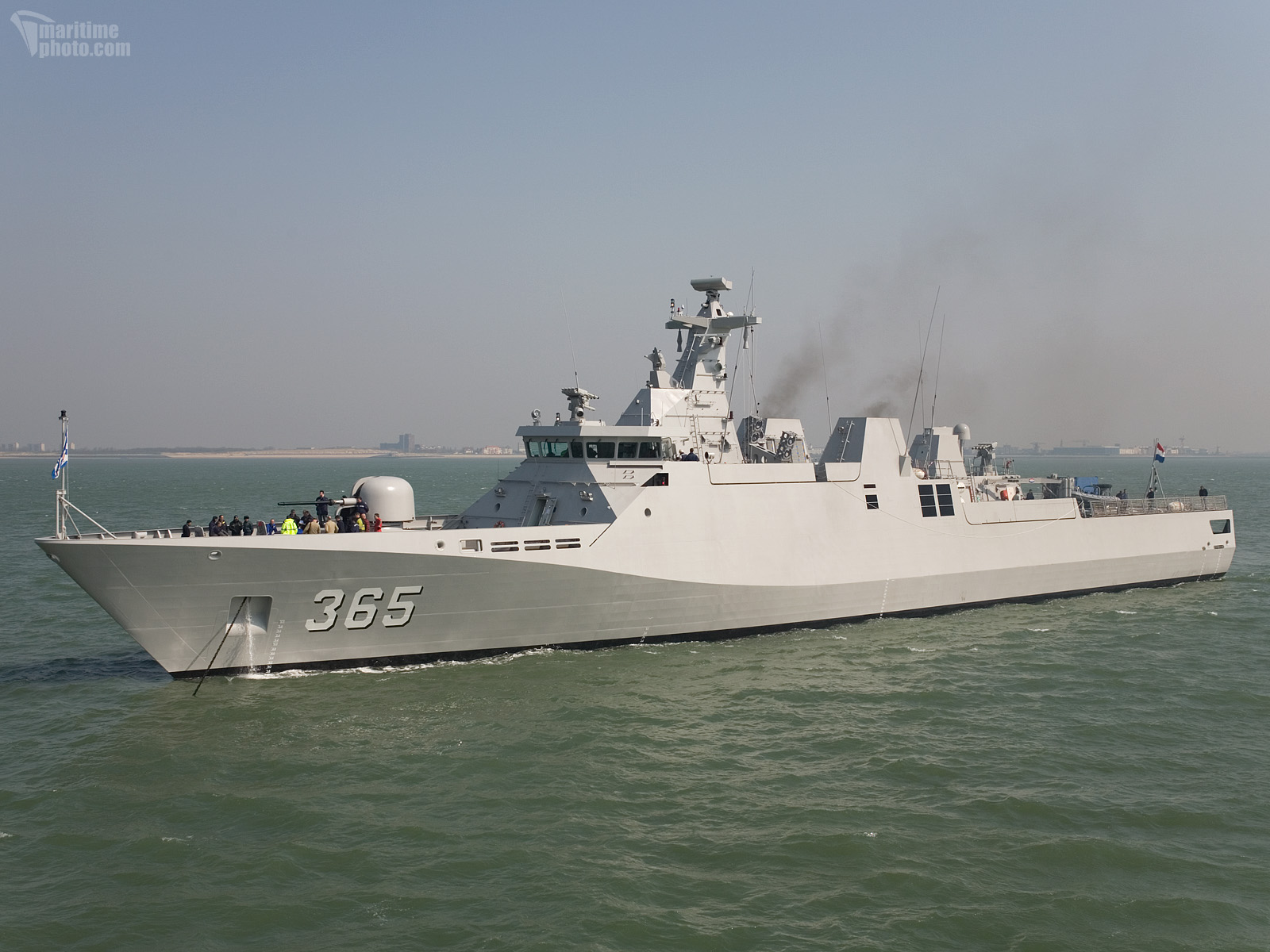
KRI Diponegoro

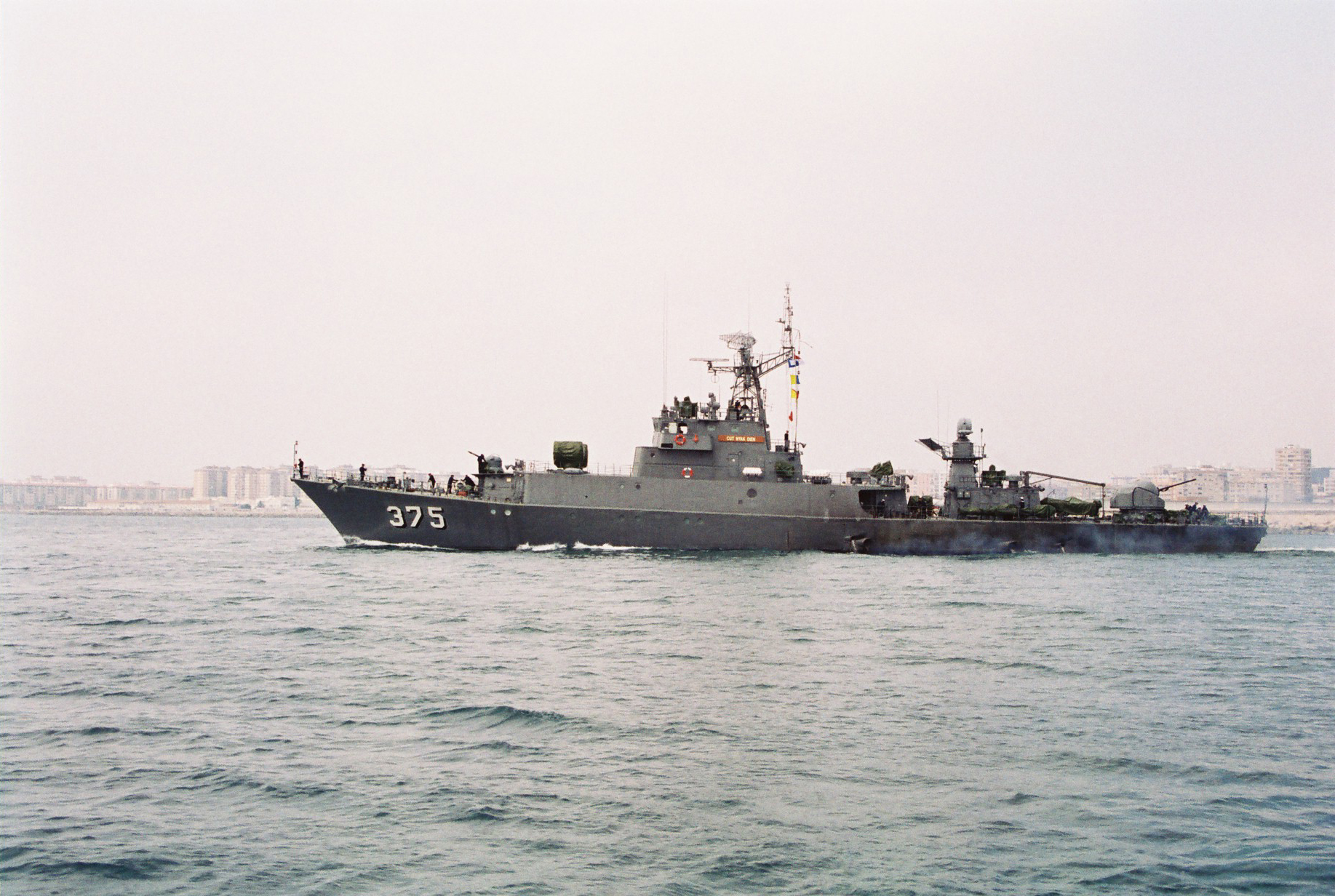
KRI Cut Nyak Dien

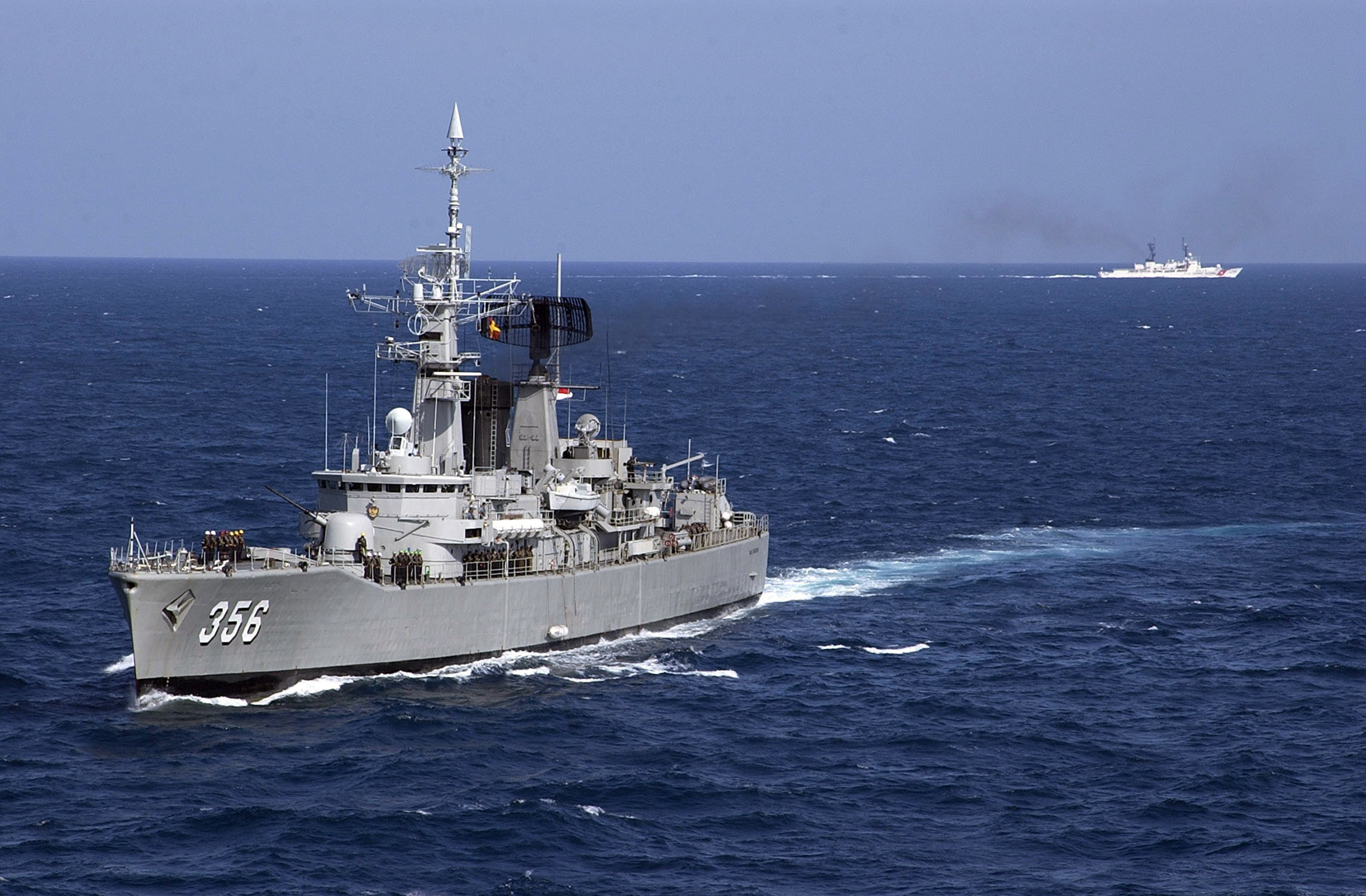
KRI Karel Satsuitubun

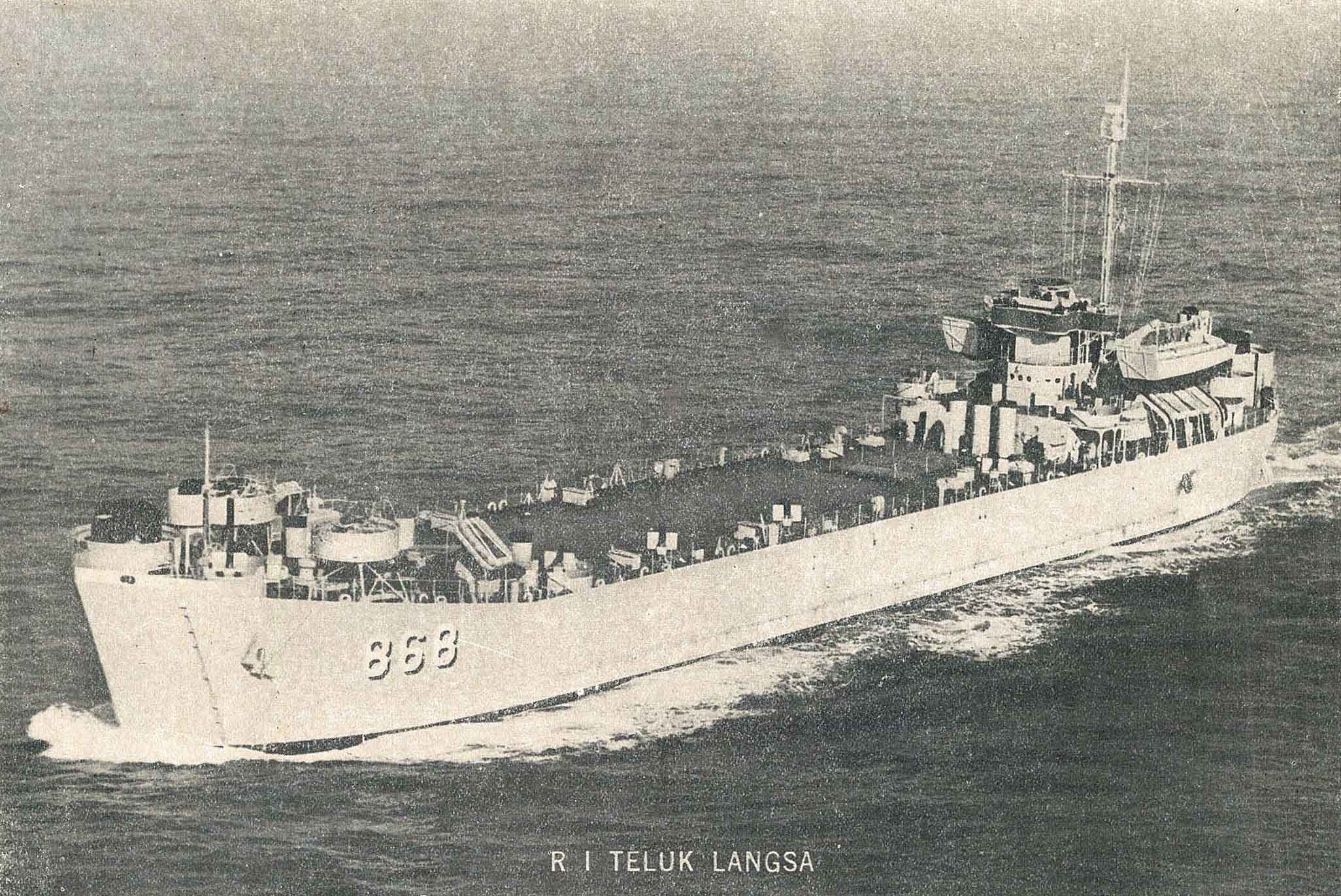
RI Teluk Langsa

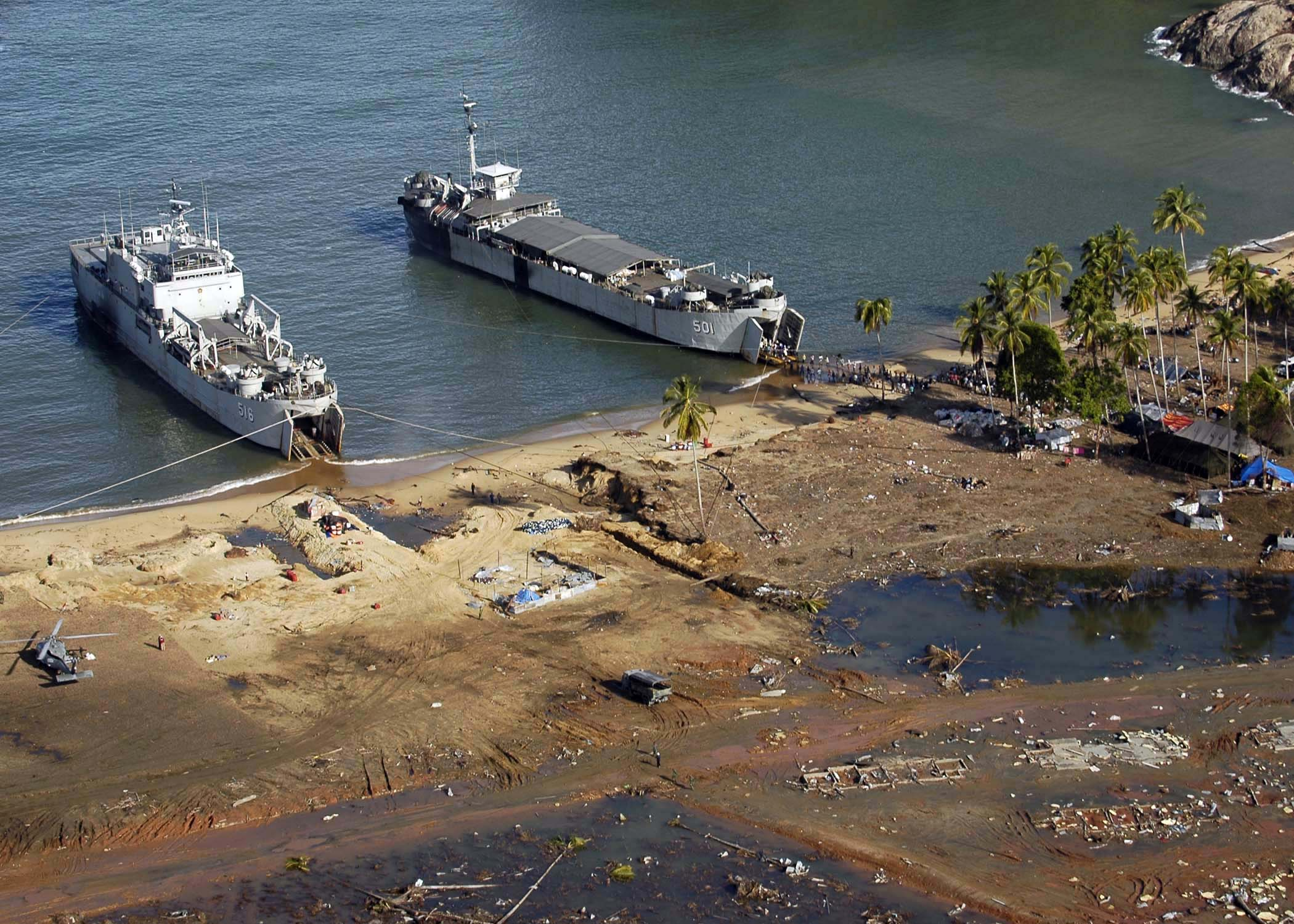
KRI Teluk Langsa & KRI Teluk Banten

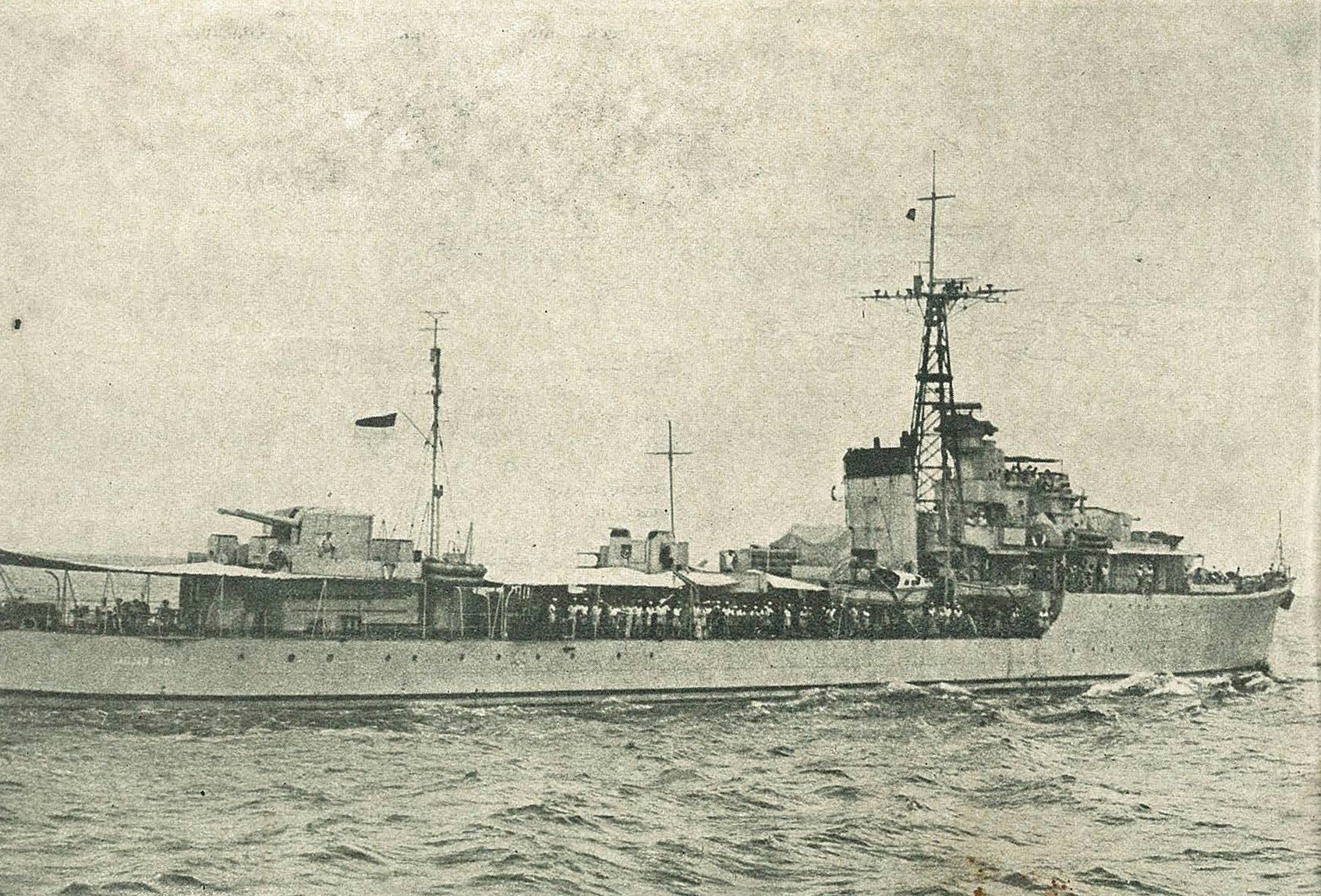
RI Gadjah Mada

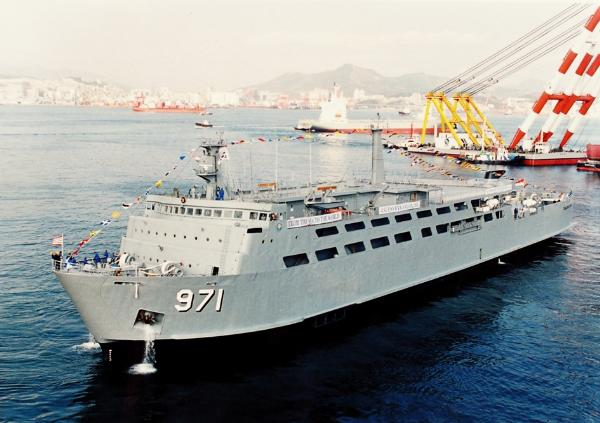
KRI Tanjung Kambani

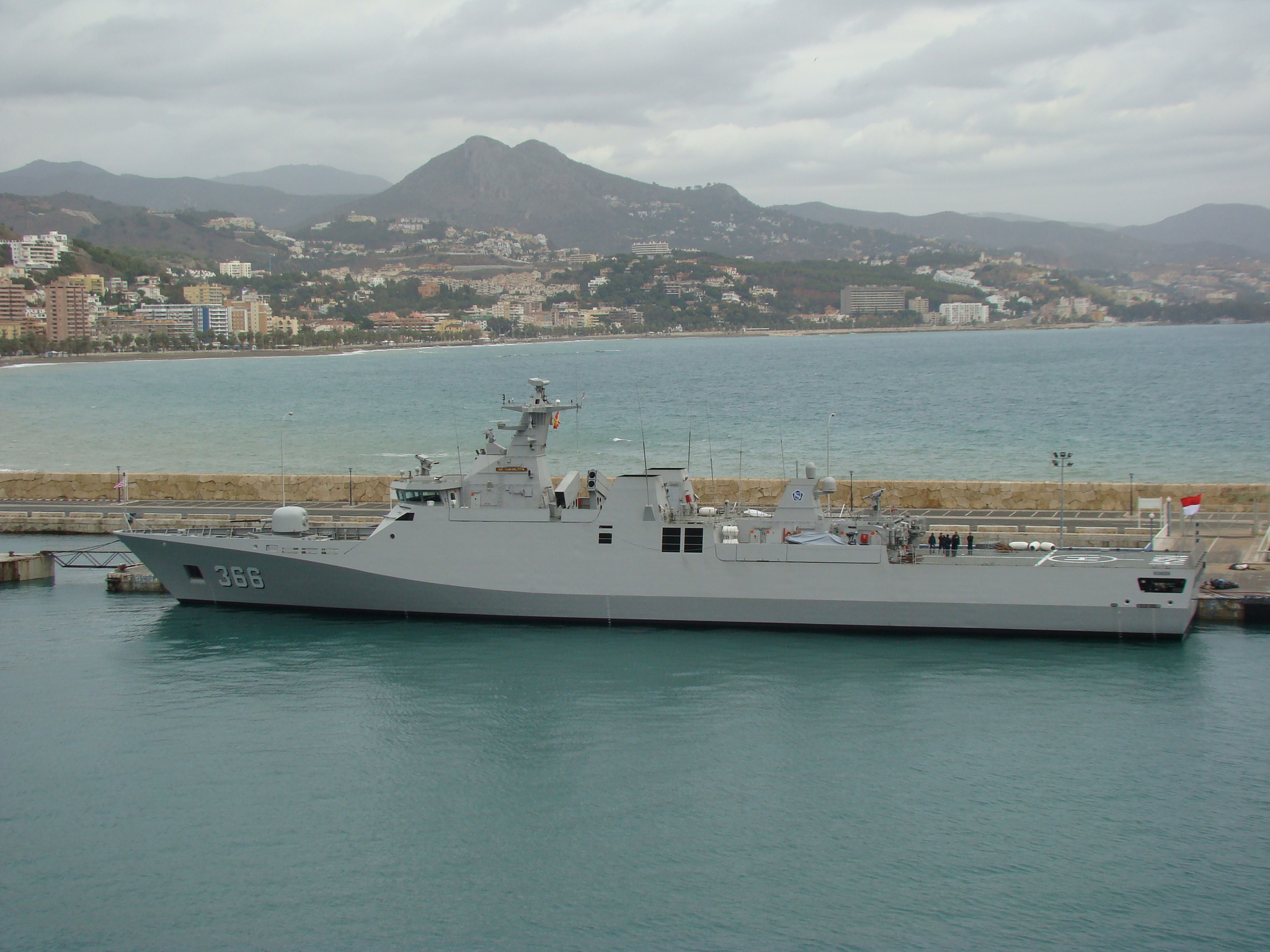
KRI Sultan Hasanuddin

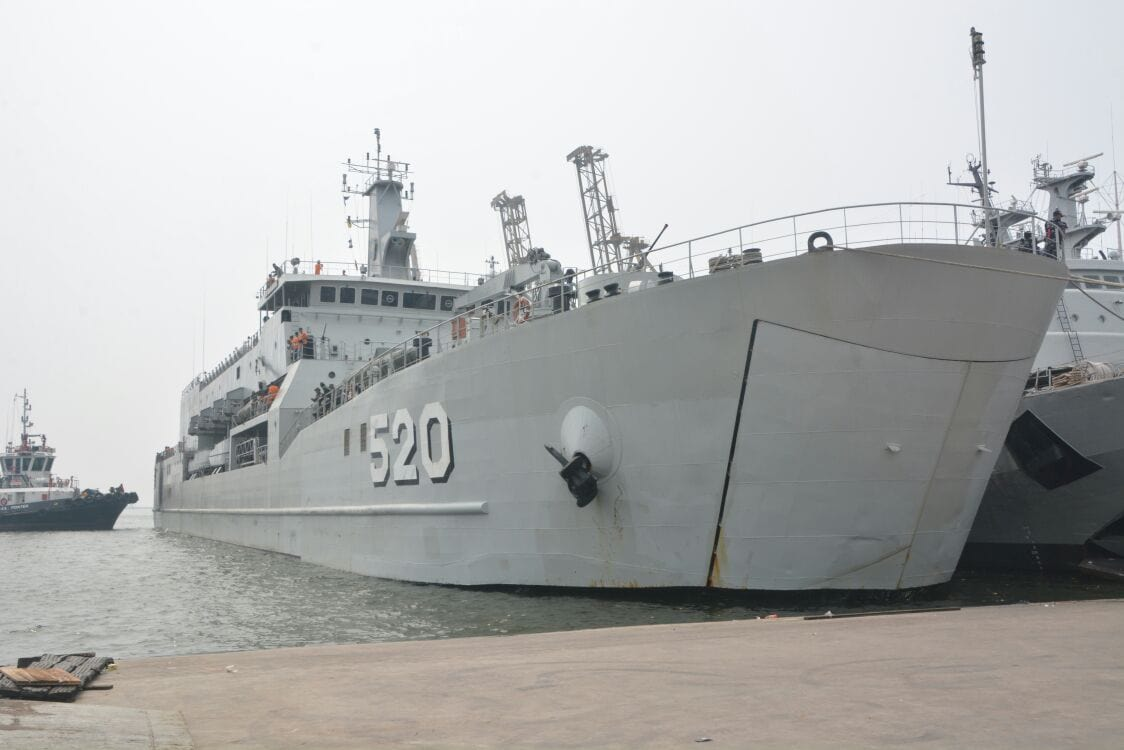
KRI Teluk Bintuni

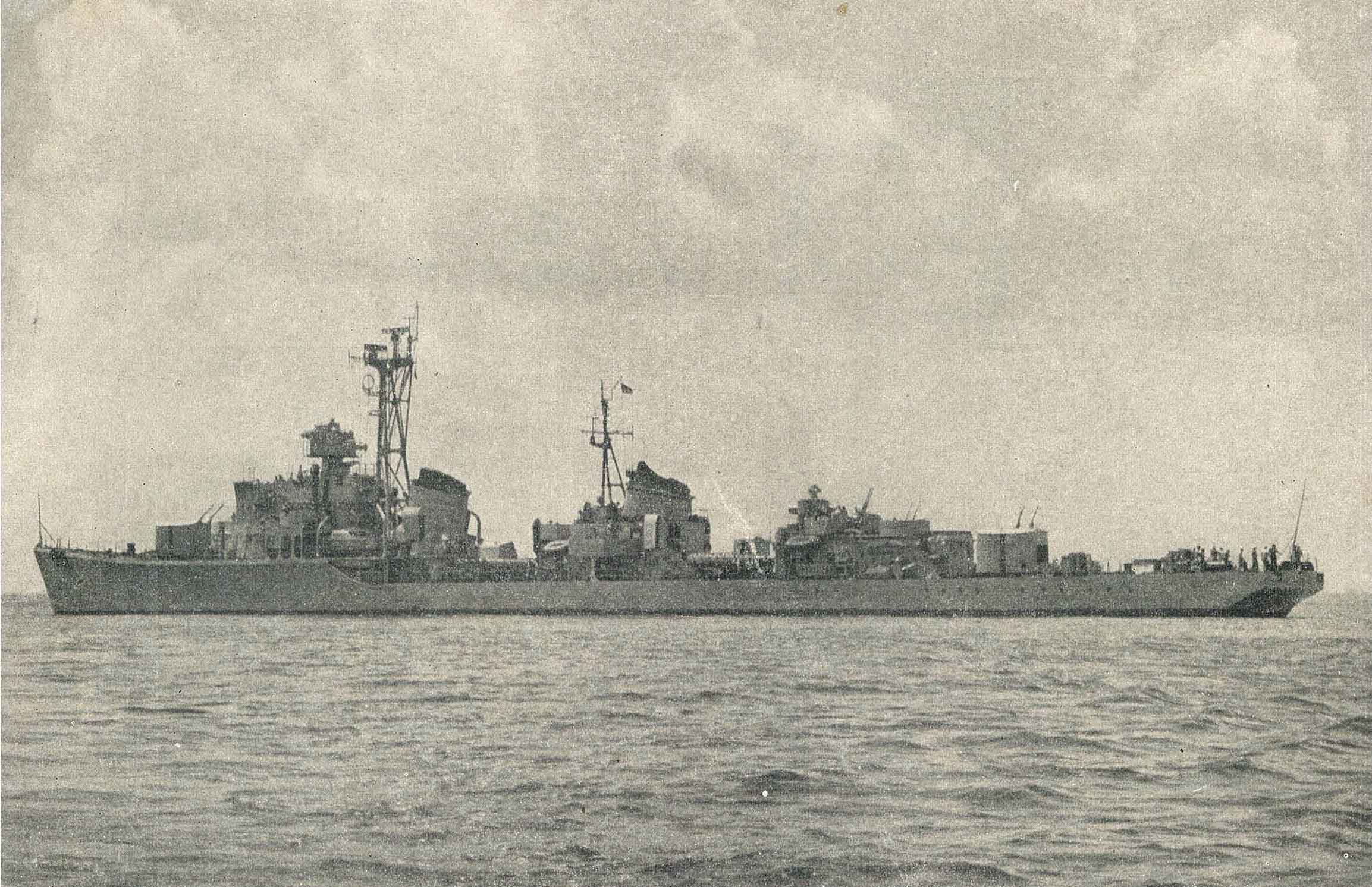
RI Siliwangi

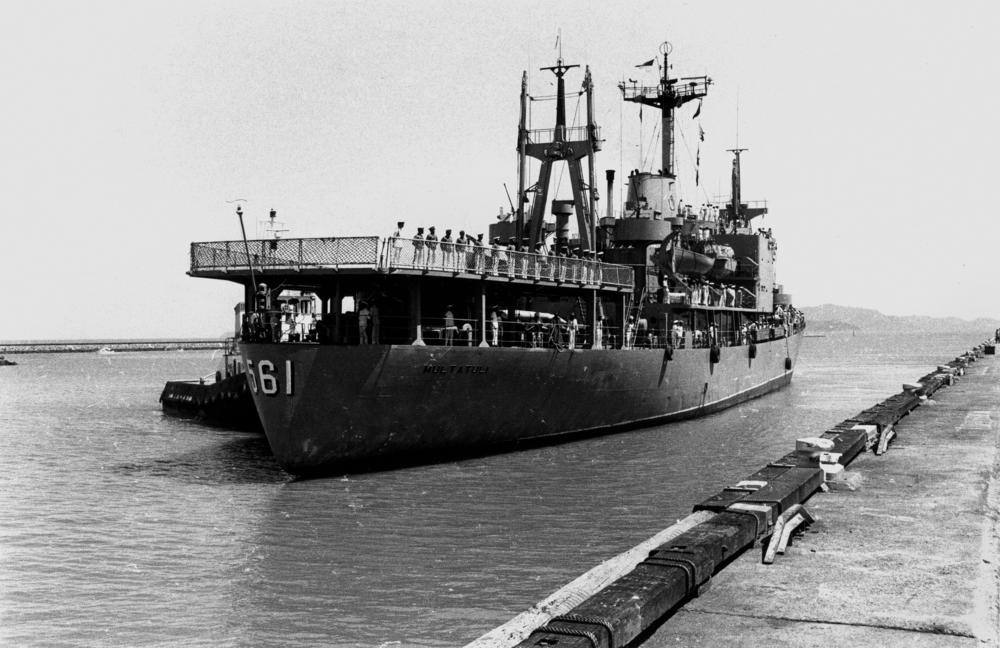
KRI Multatuli

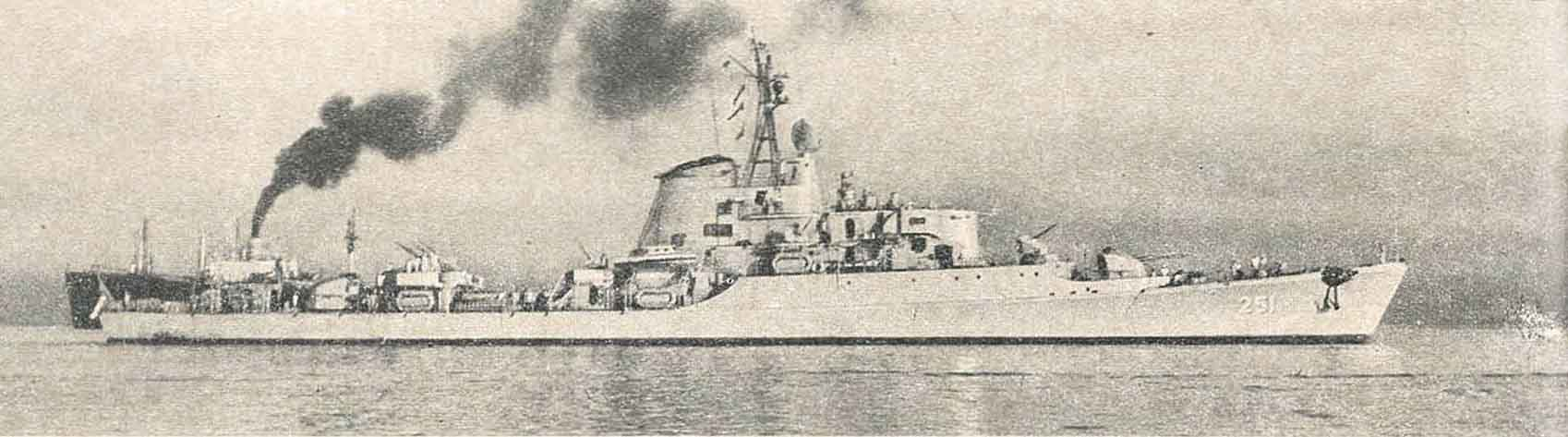
RI Untung Surapati

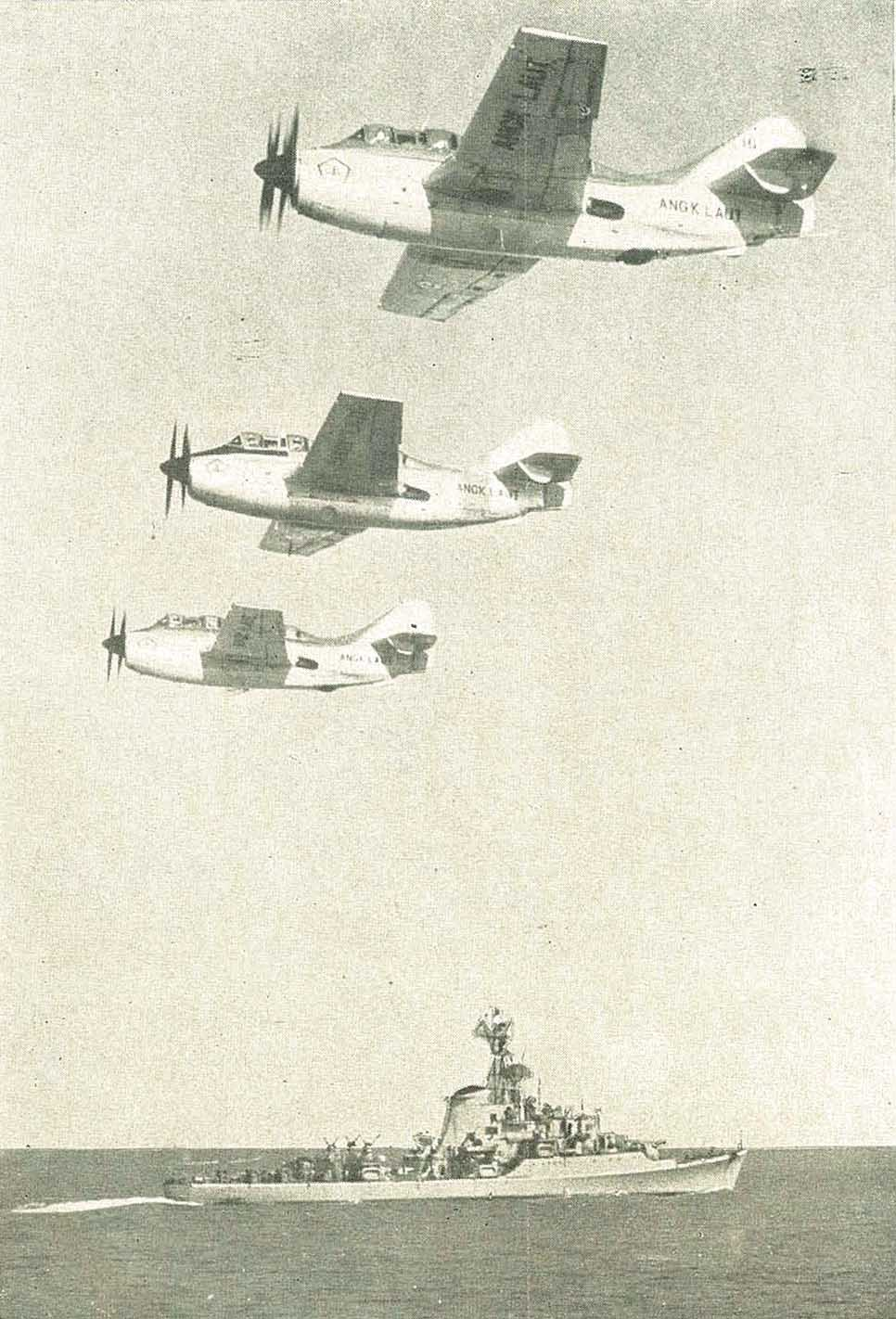
Indonesian navy aviation Fairey Gannet

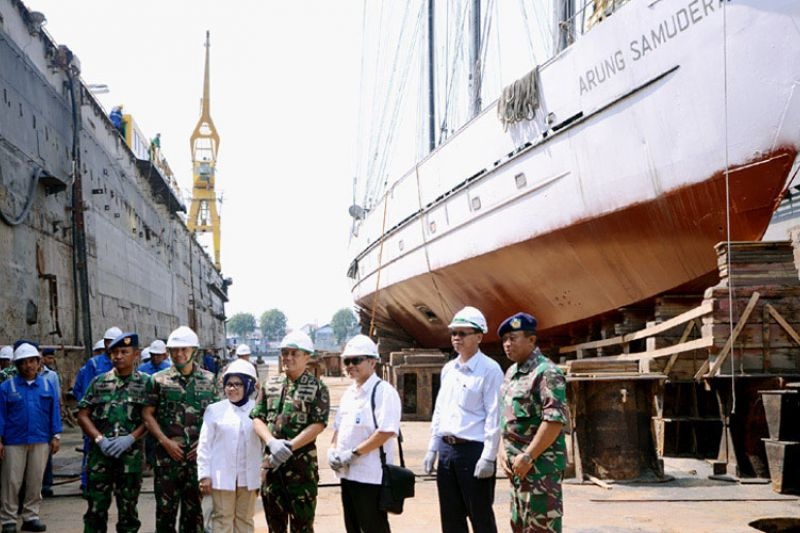
KRI Arung Samudera

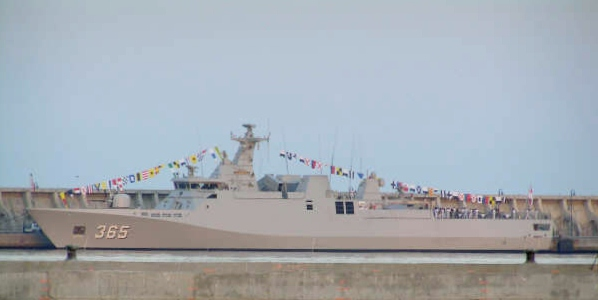
KRI Diponegoro

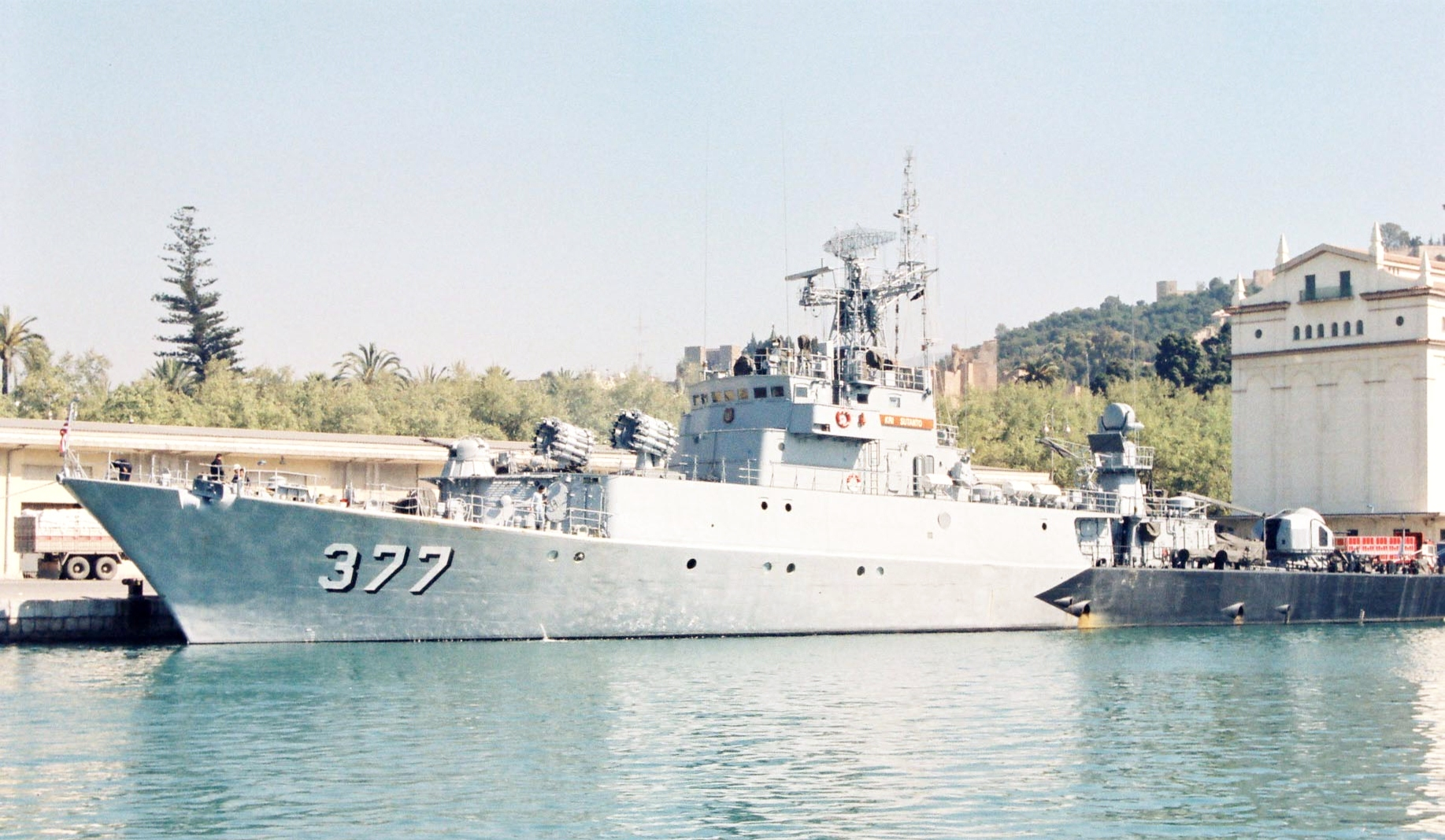
KRI Sutanto

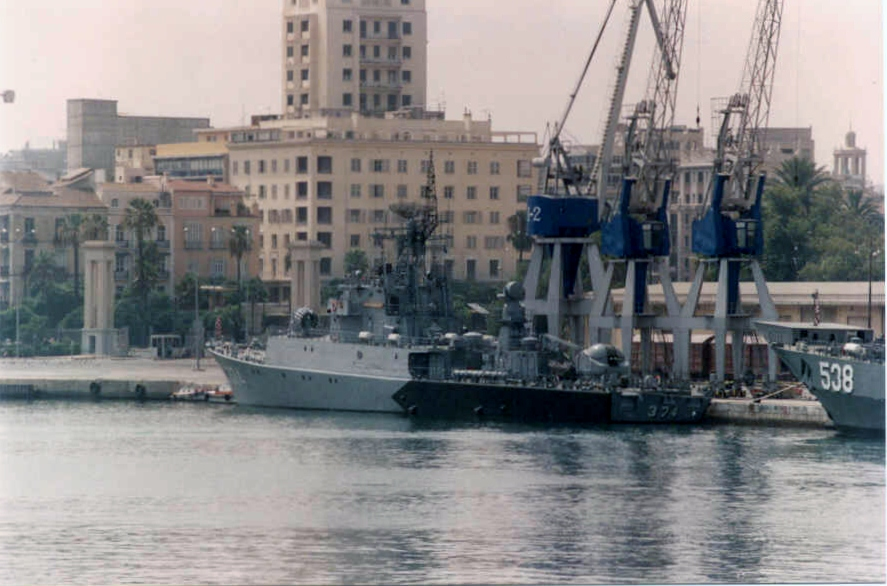
KRI Lambung Mangkurat

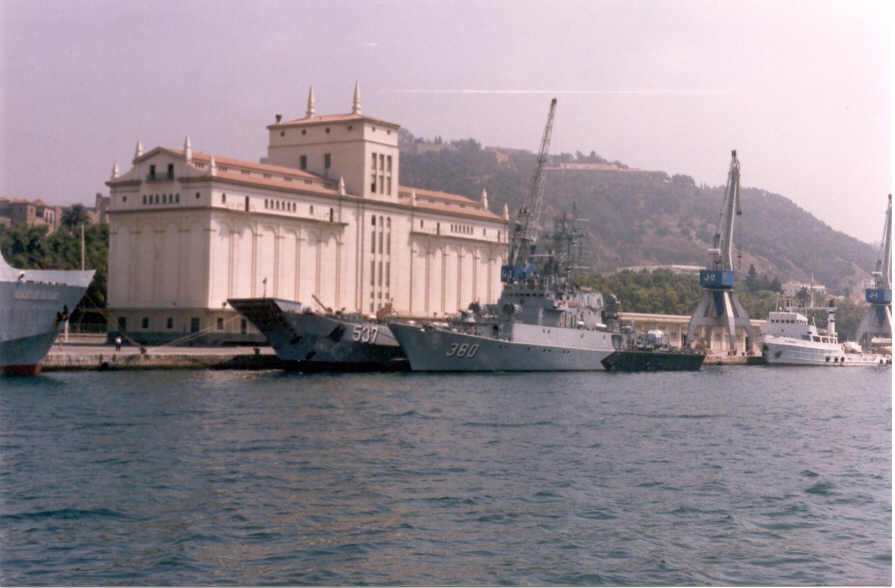
KRI Memet Sastrawiria & KRI Teluk Manado

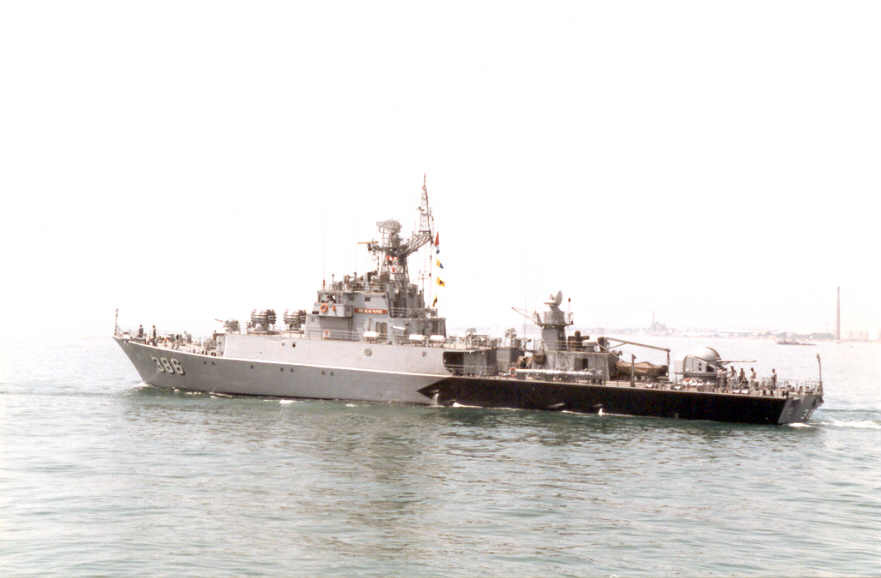
KRI Silas Papare

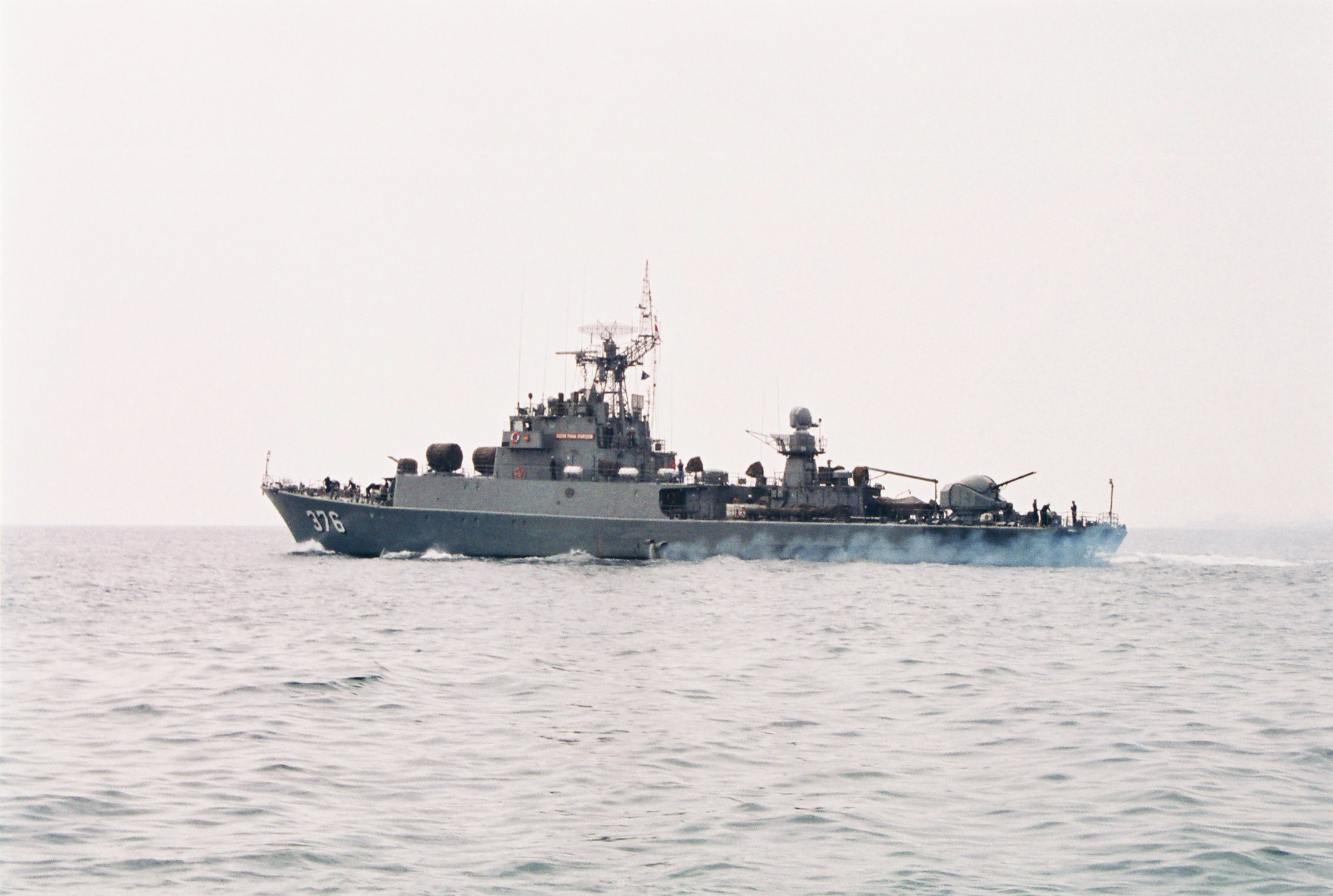
KRI Sultan Thaha Syaifuddin

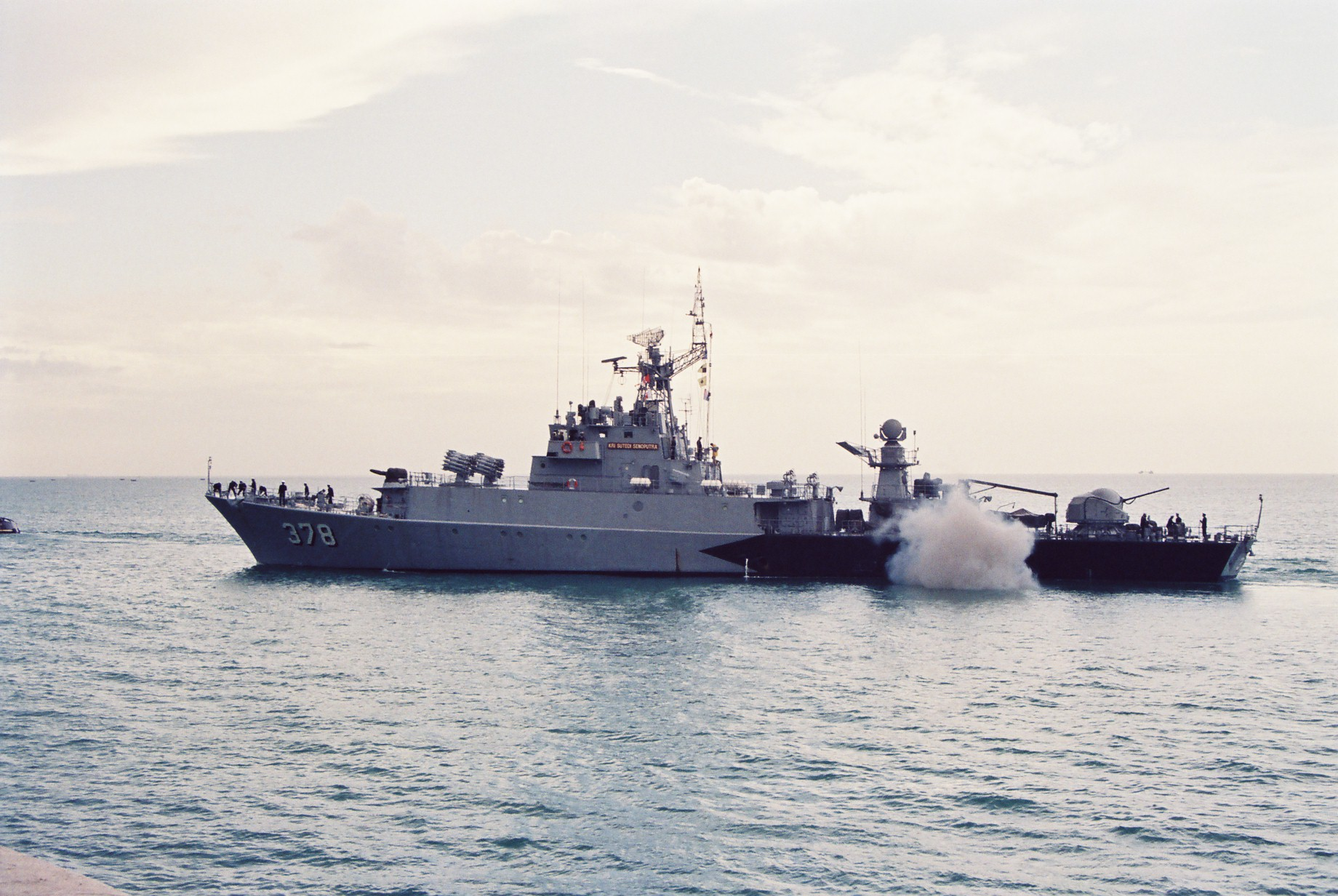
KRI Sutedi Senoputra

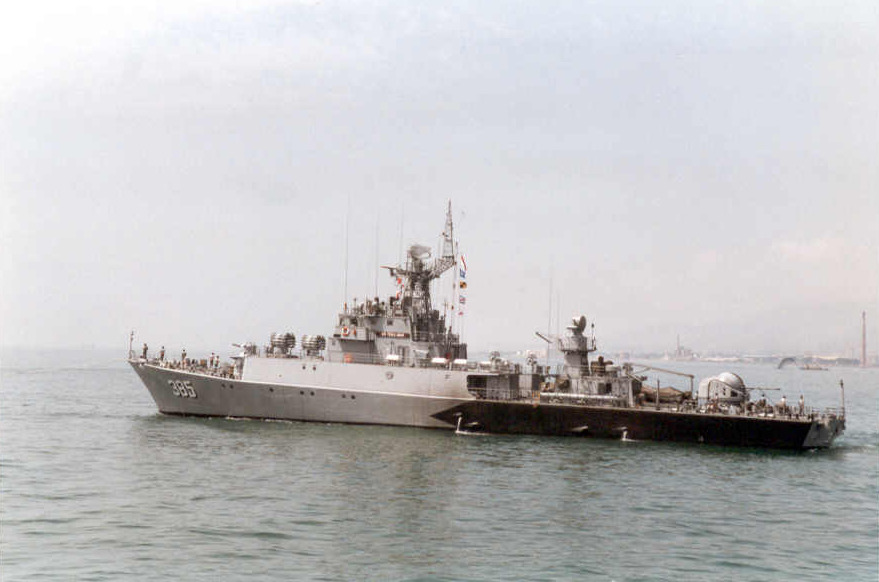
KRI Teuku Umar

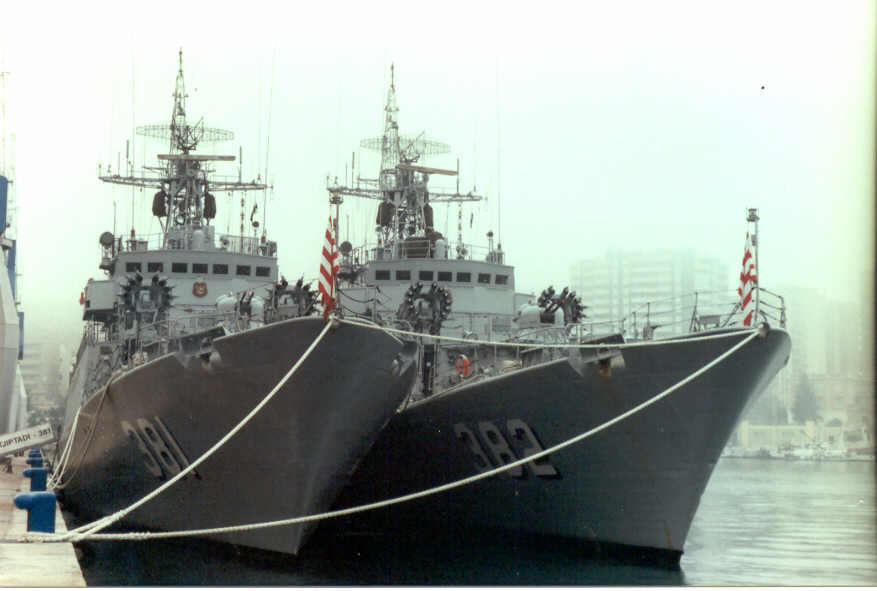
KRI Tjiptadi & KRI Hasan Basri

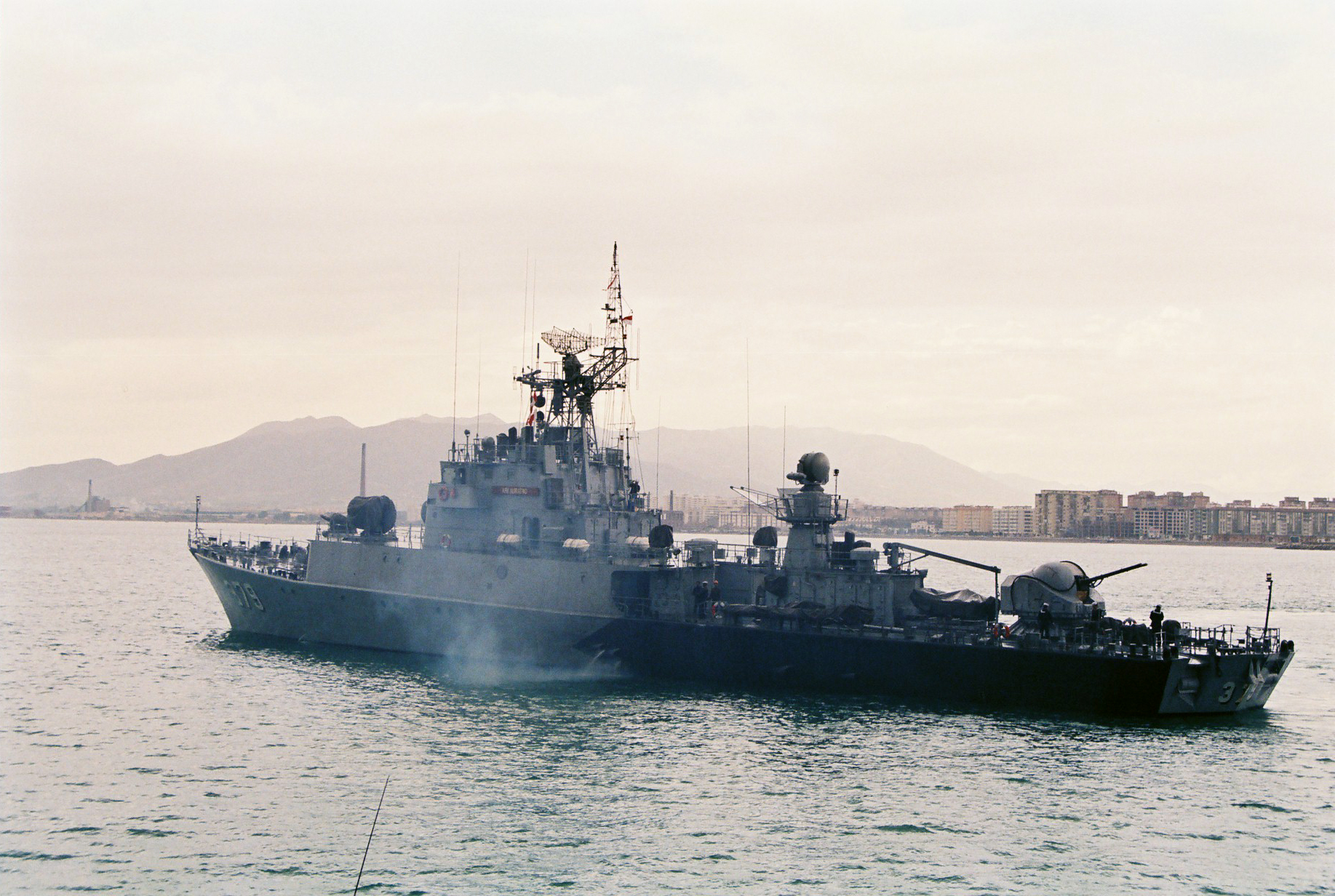
KRI Wiratno

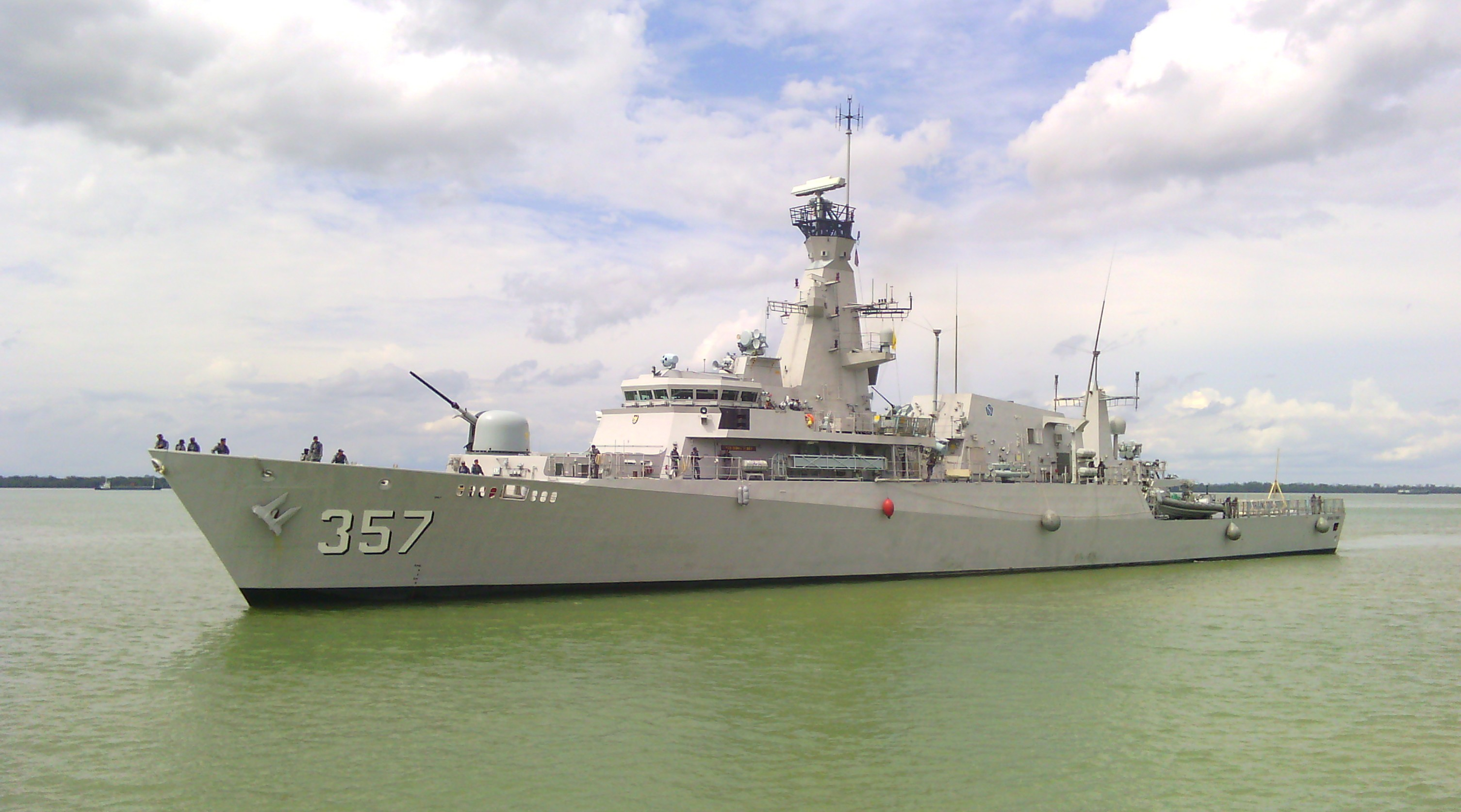
KRI Bung Tomo

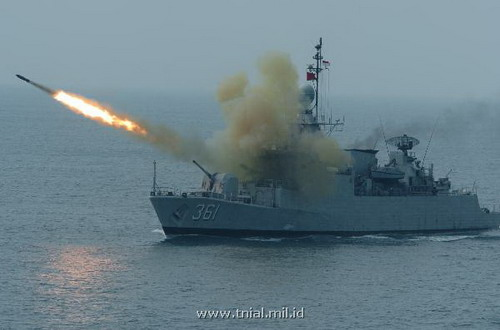
KRI Fatahillah

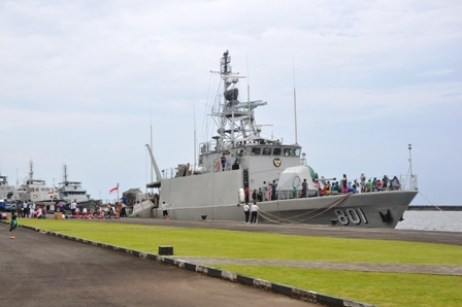
KRI Pandrong

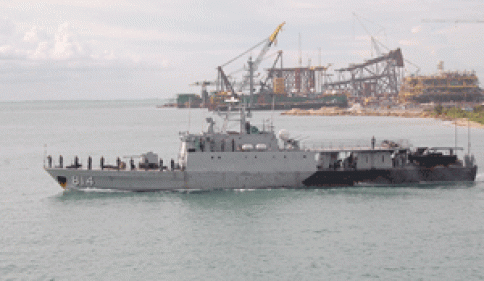
KRI Barakuda

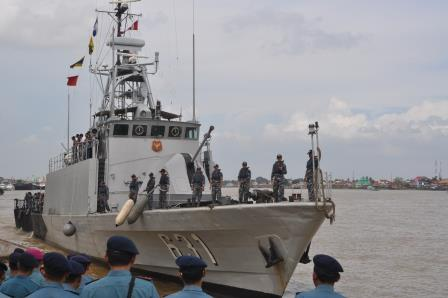
KRI Todak

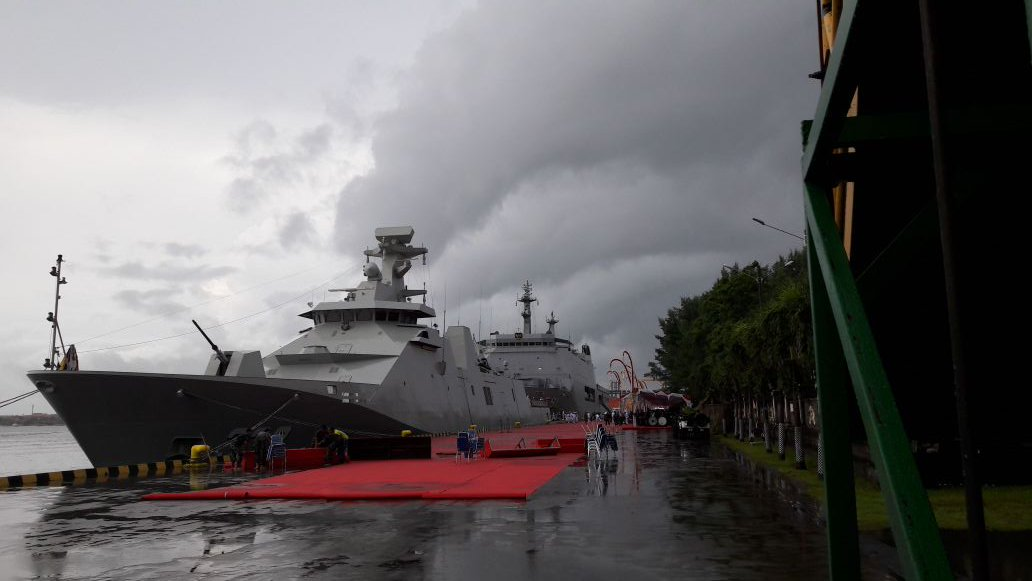
KRI I Gusti Ngurah Rai

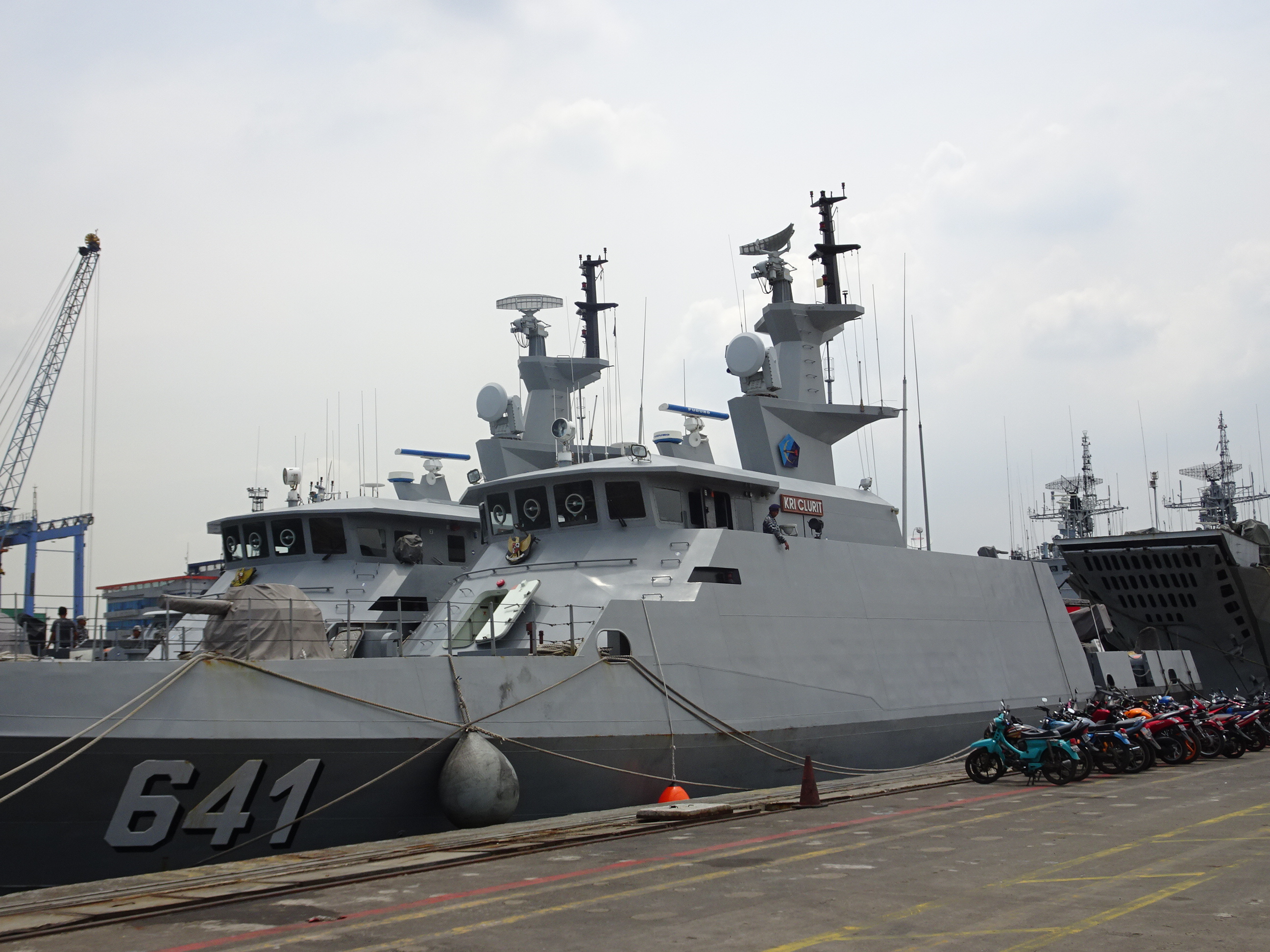
KRI Clurit

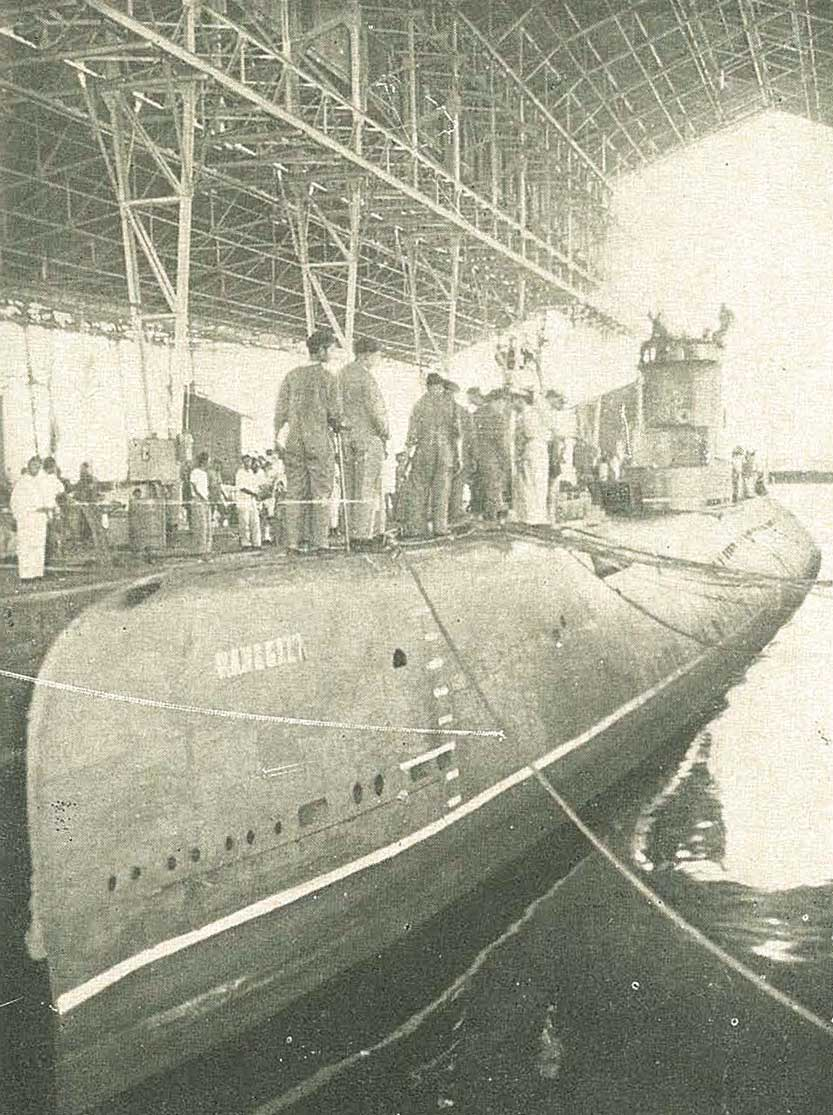
RI Nanggala

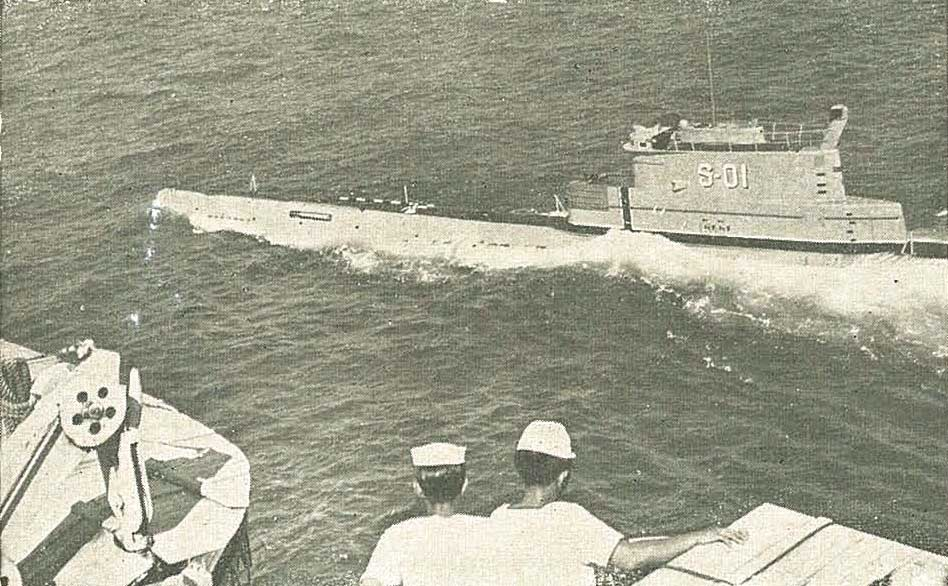
RI Tjakra

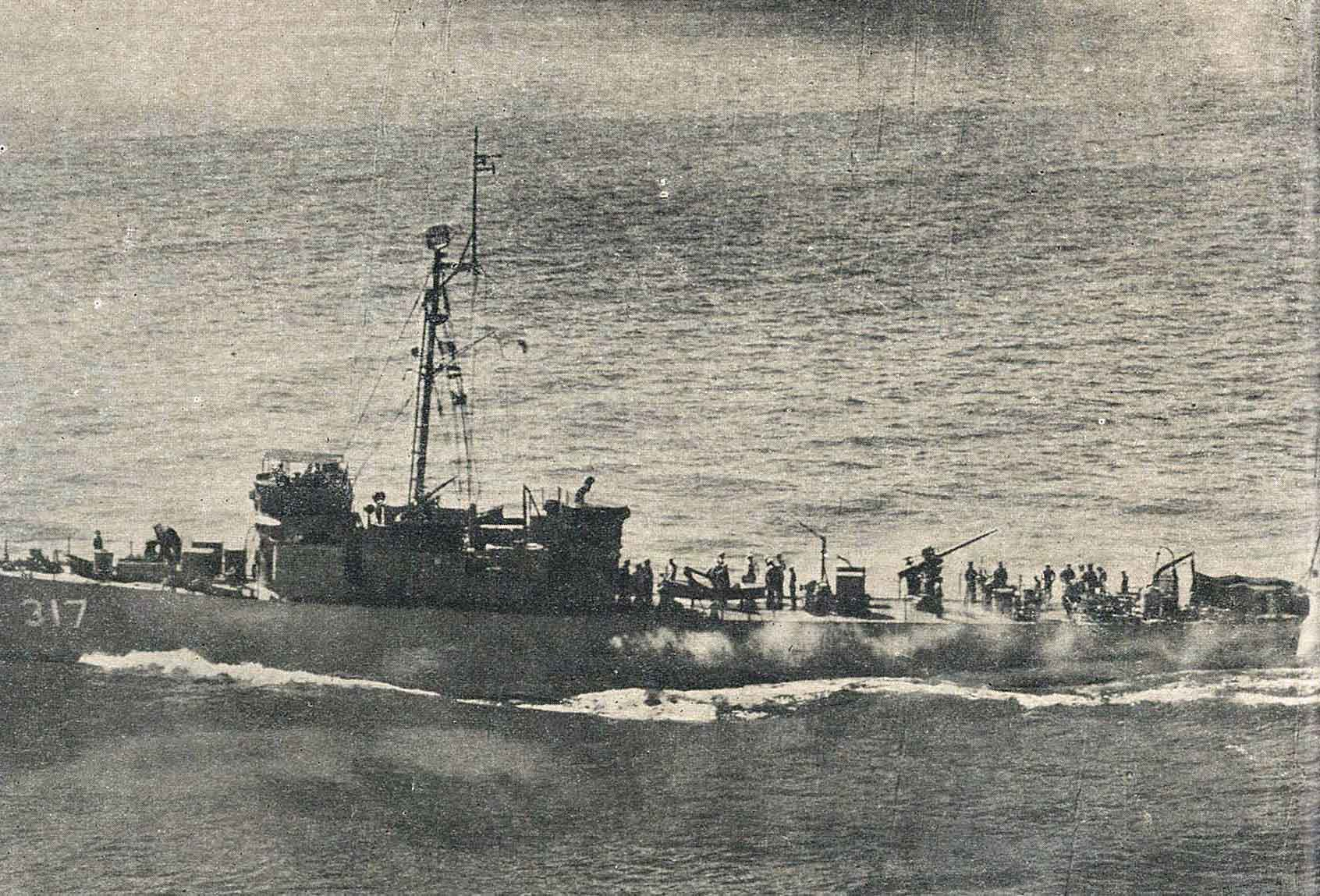
RI Torani

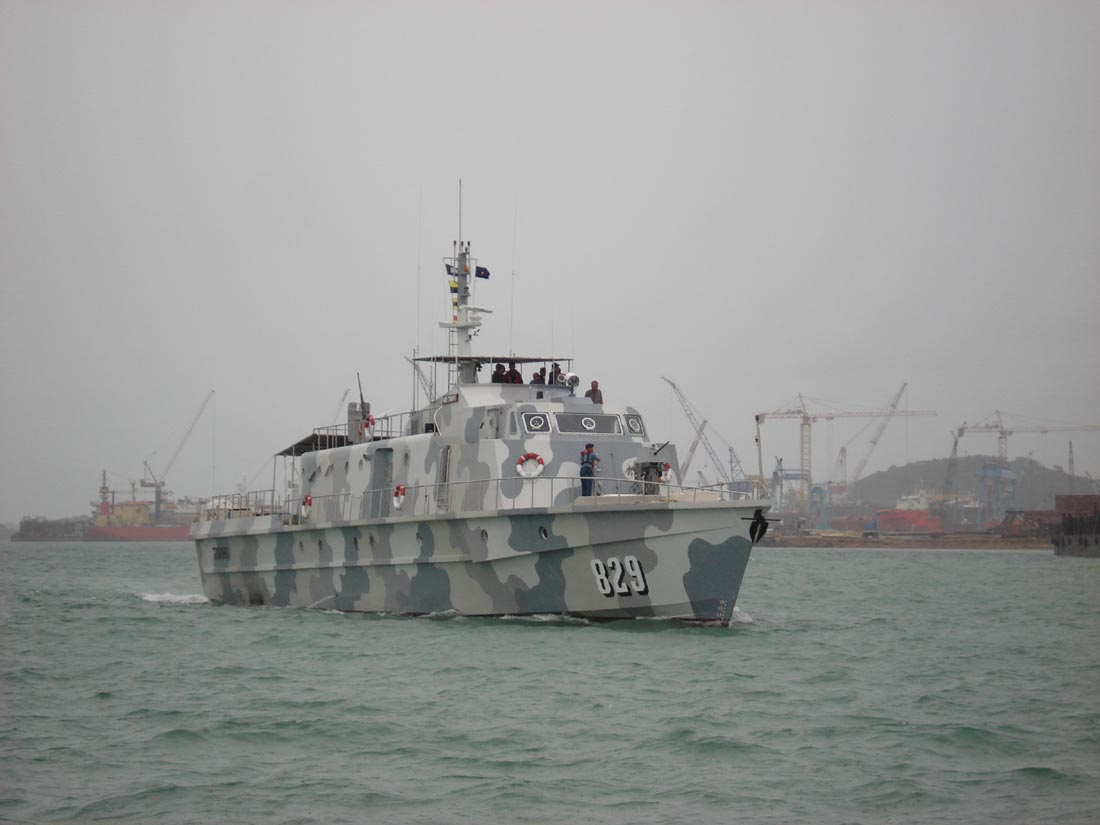
KRI Tarihu

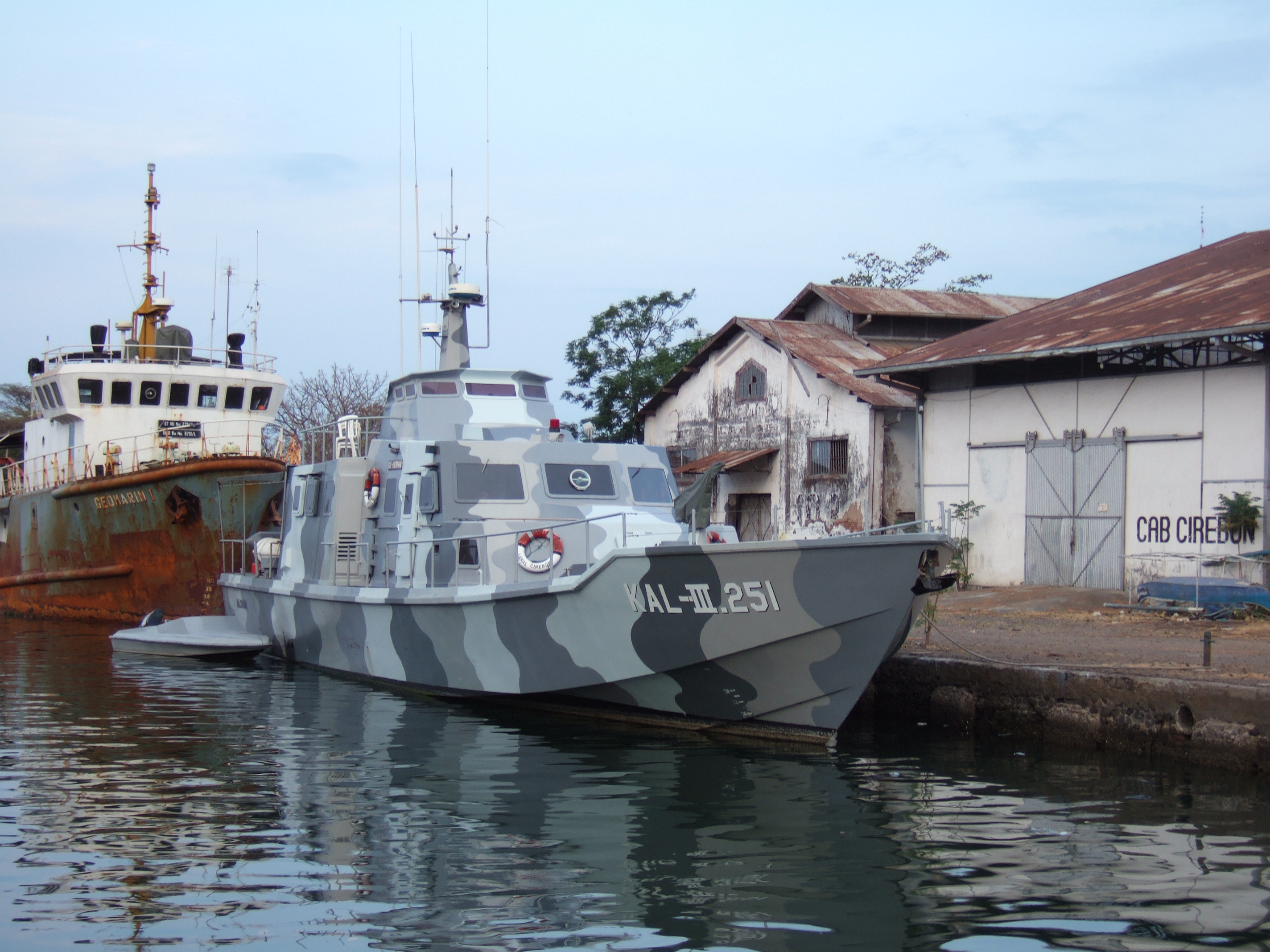
KAL Balongan

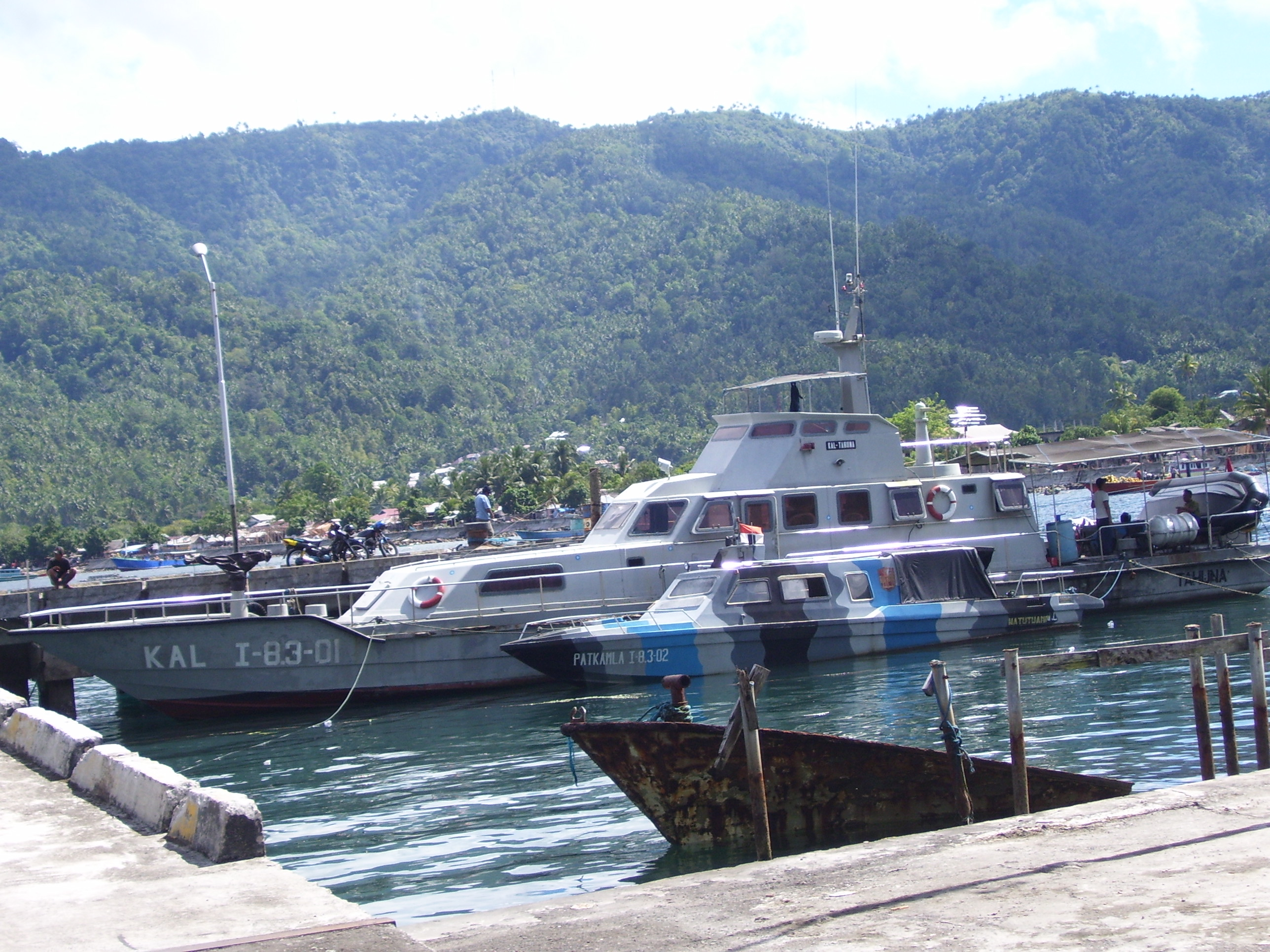
KAL Tahuna

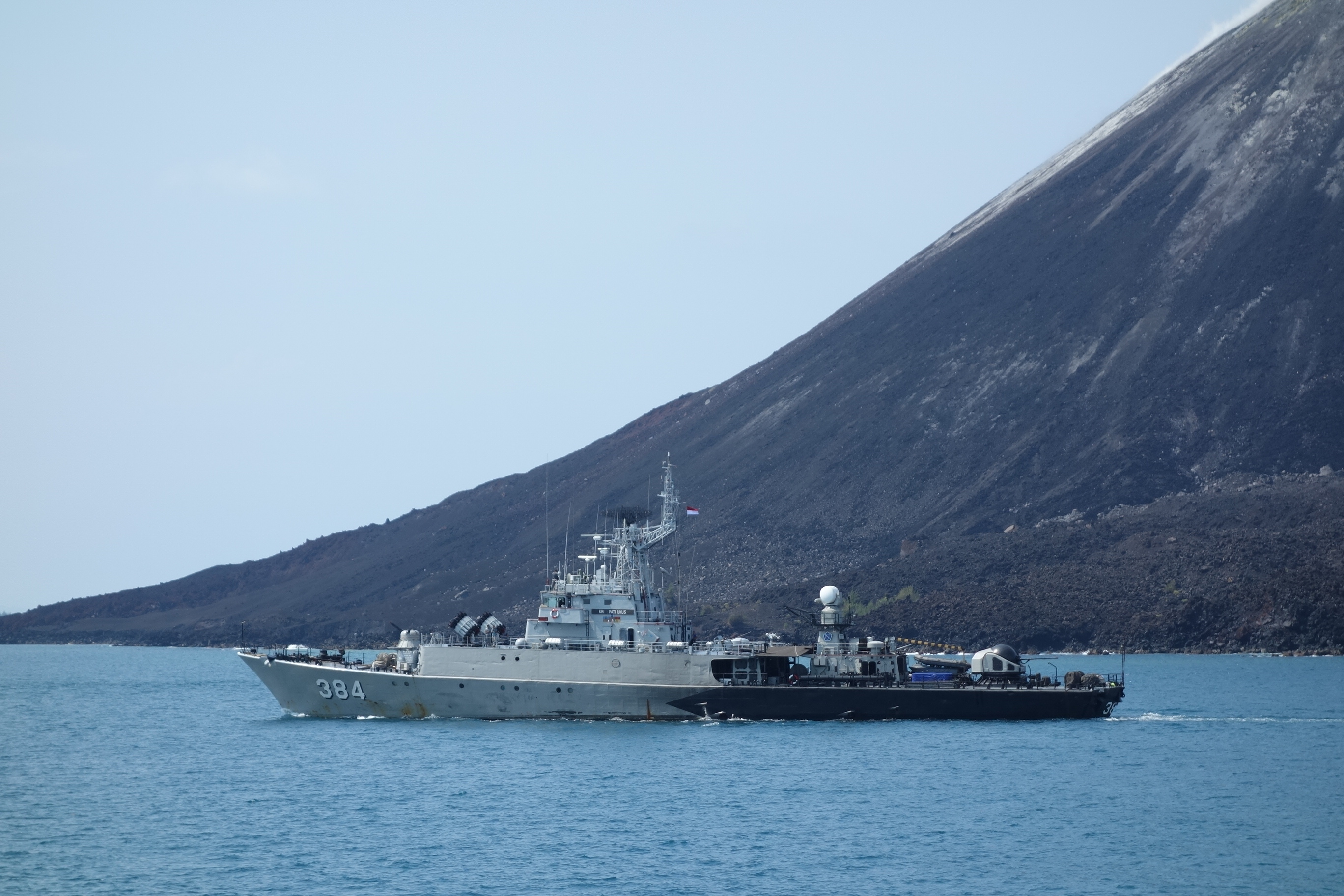
KRI Pati Unus

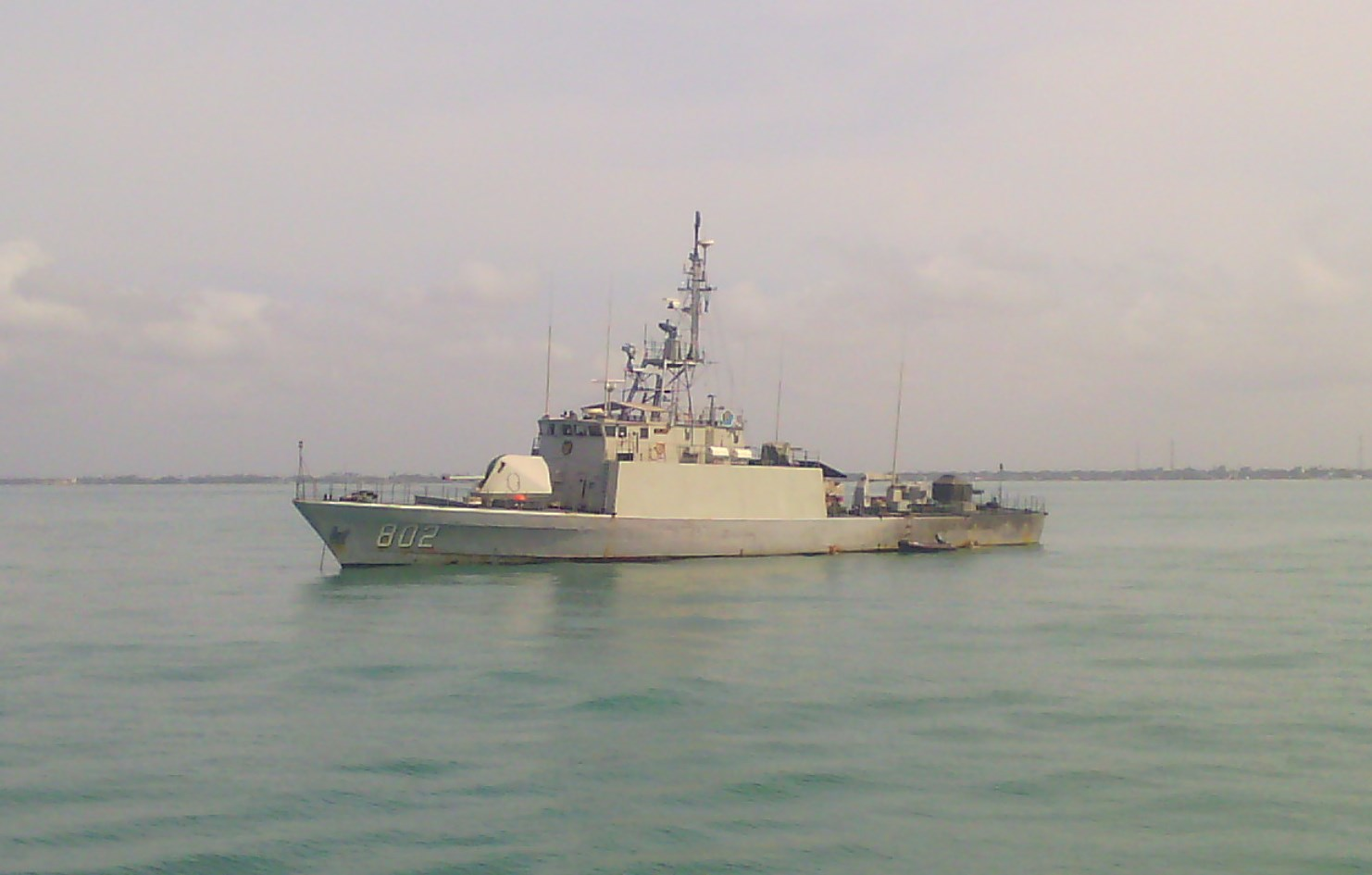
KRI Sura

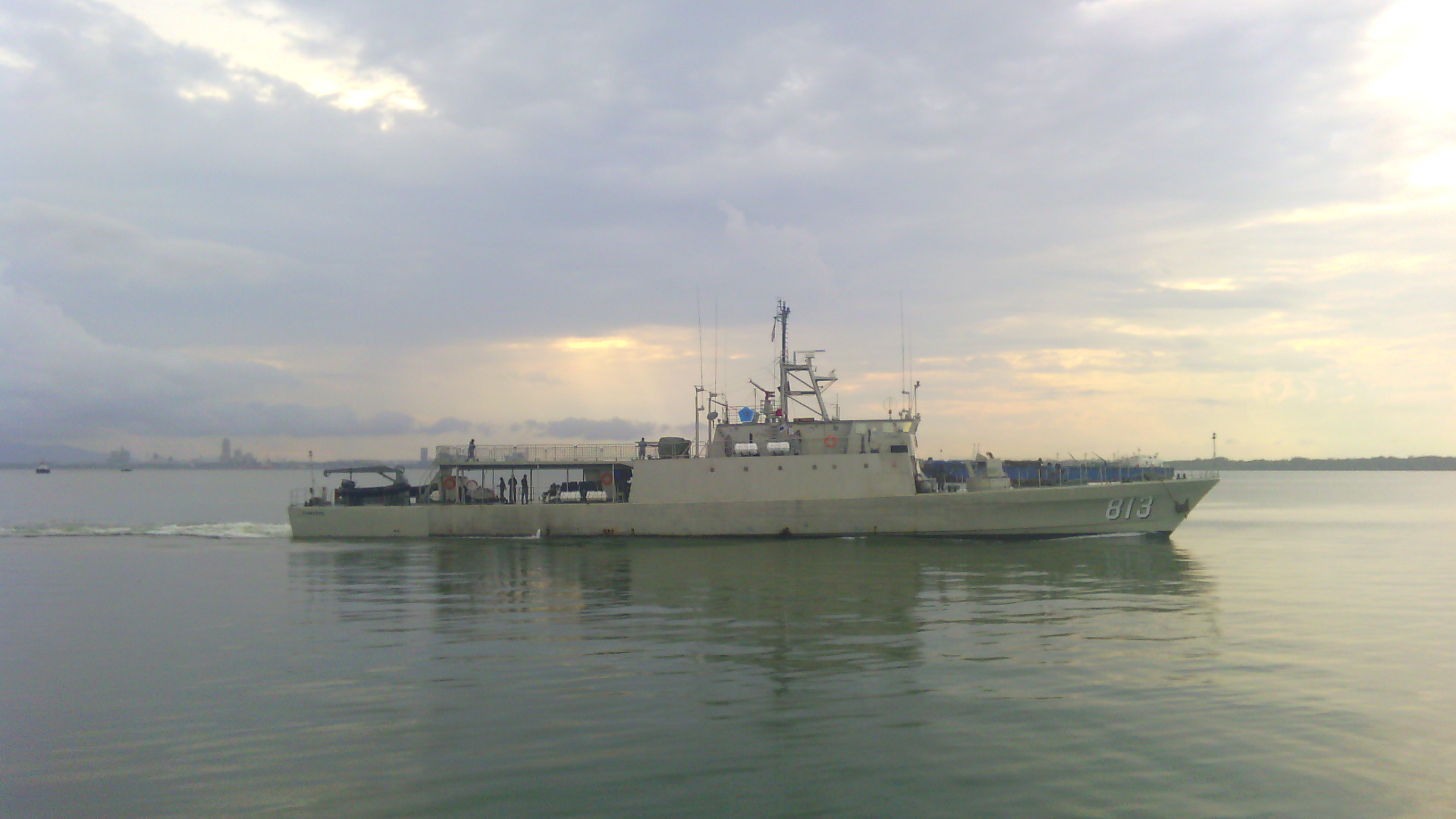
KRI Tongkol

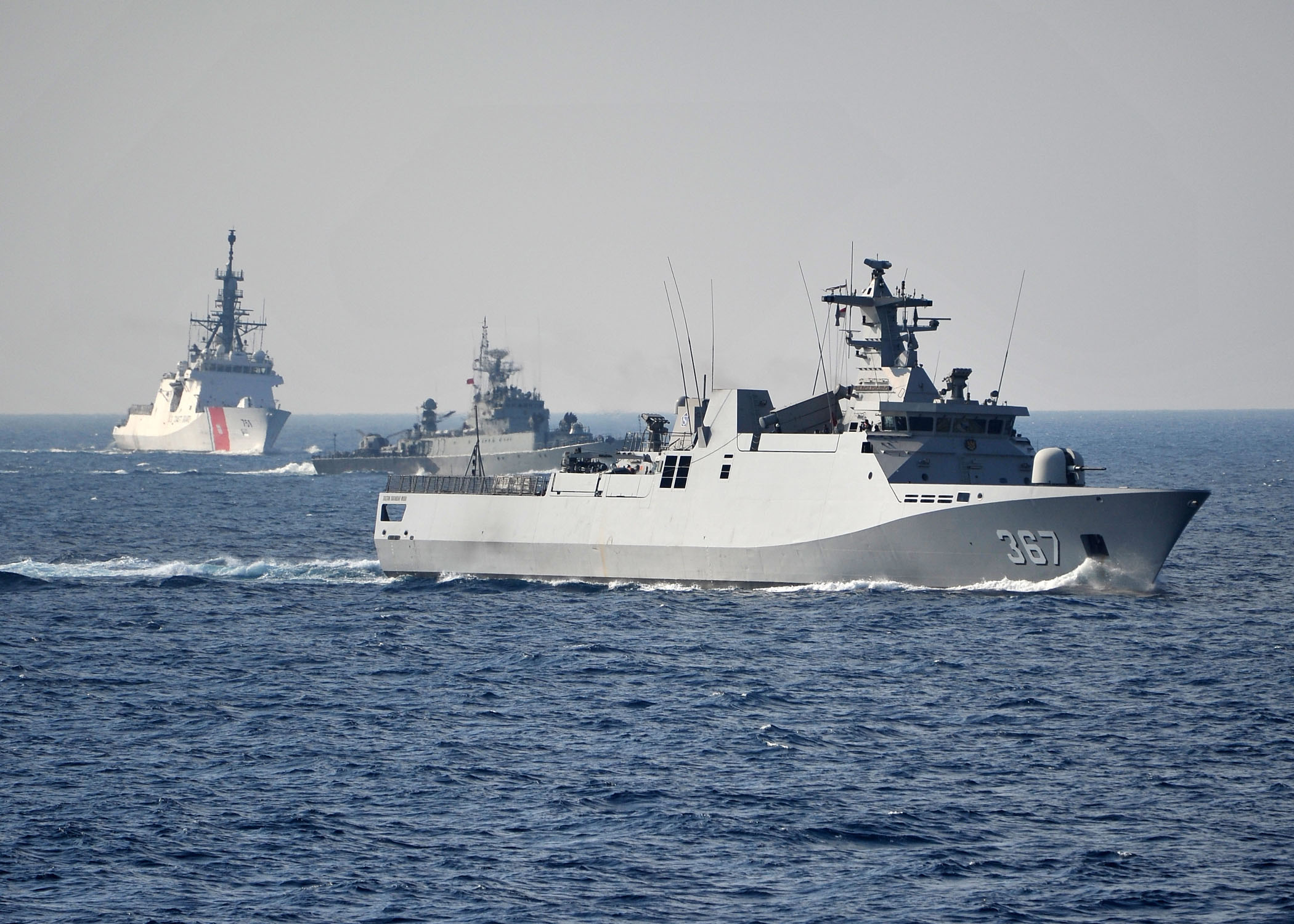
KRI Sultan Iskandar Muda & KRI Silas Papare

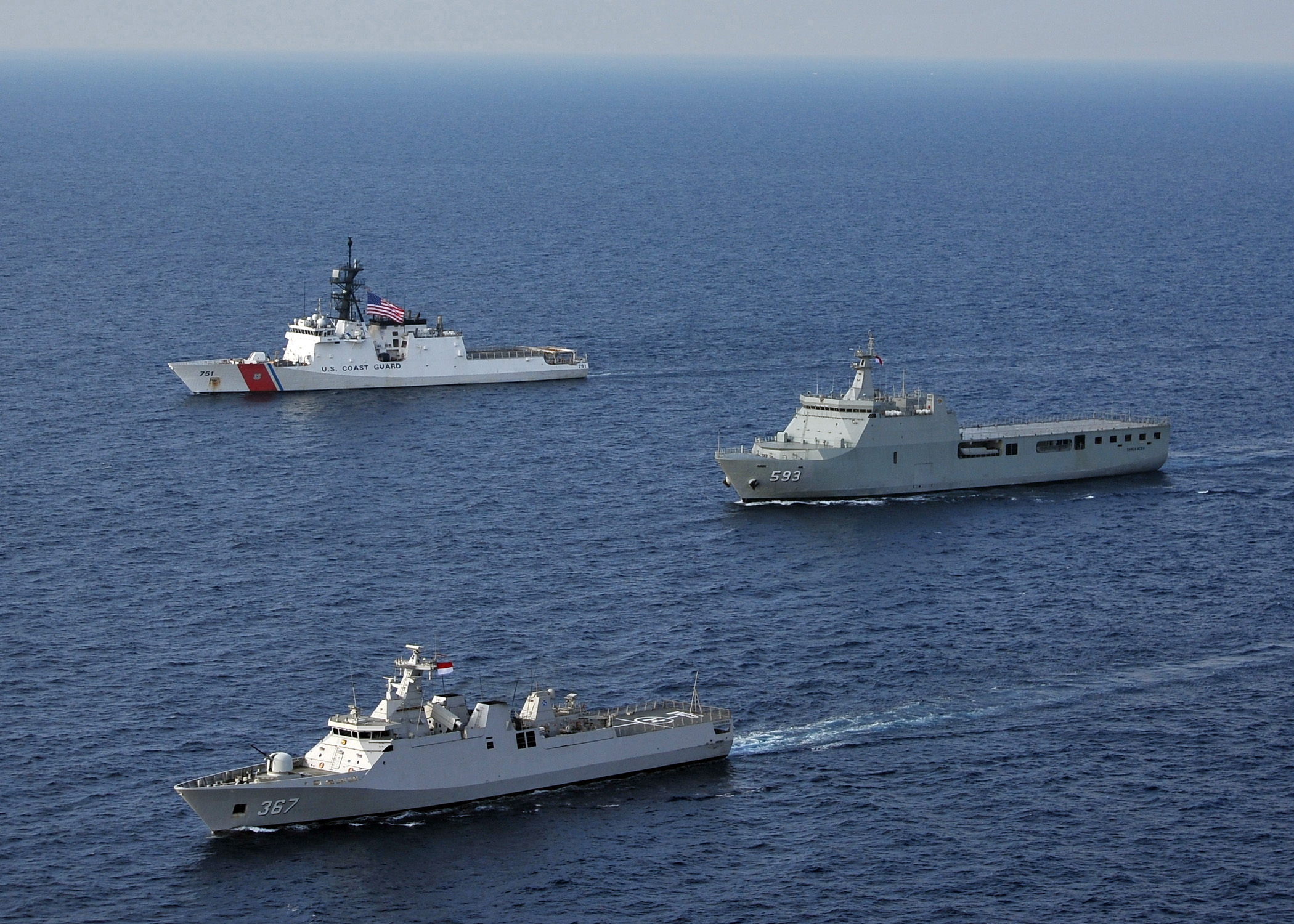
KRI Sultan Iskandar Muda & KRI Banda Aceh

KRI Banda Aceh

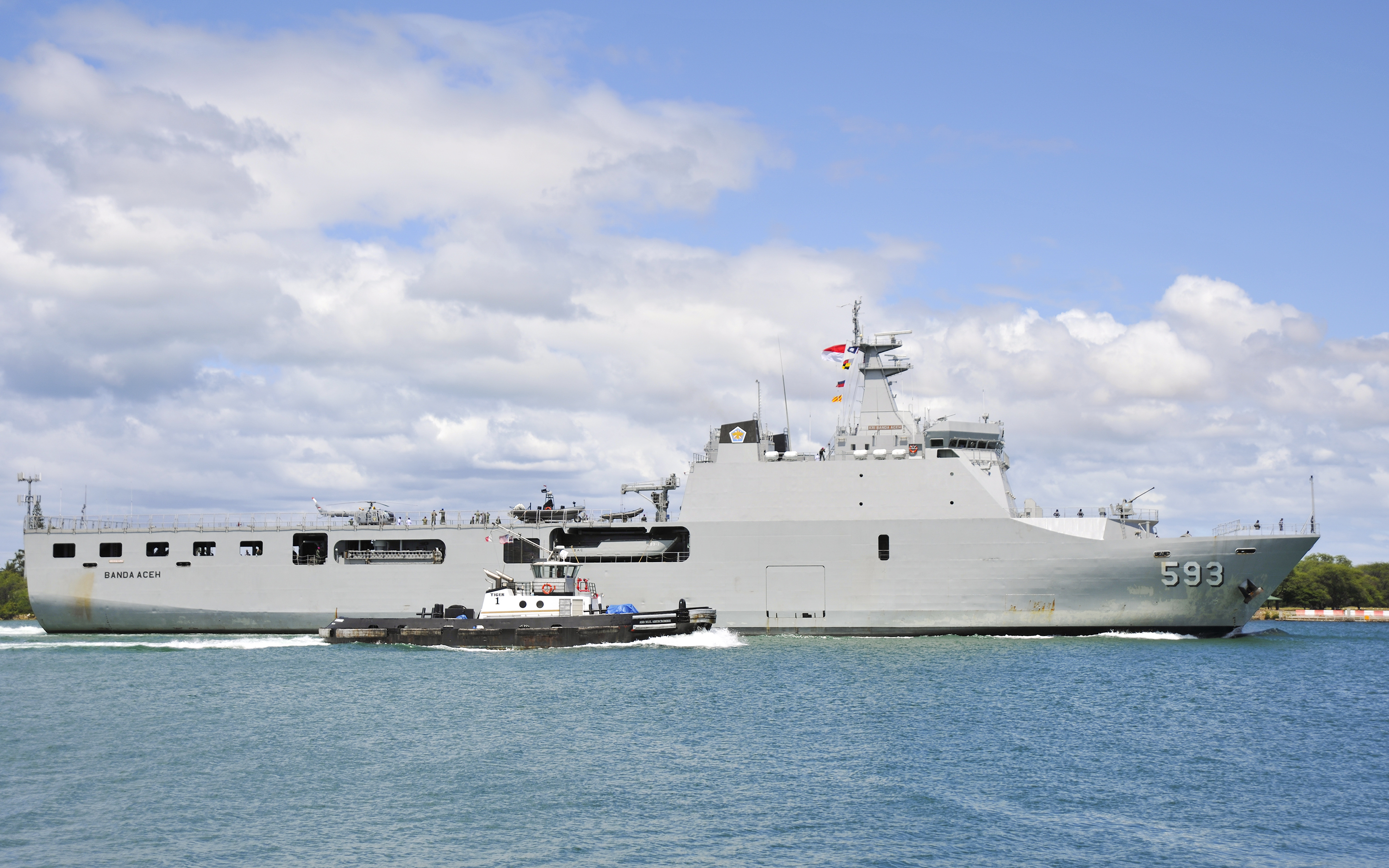
KRI Banda Aceh

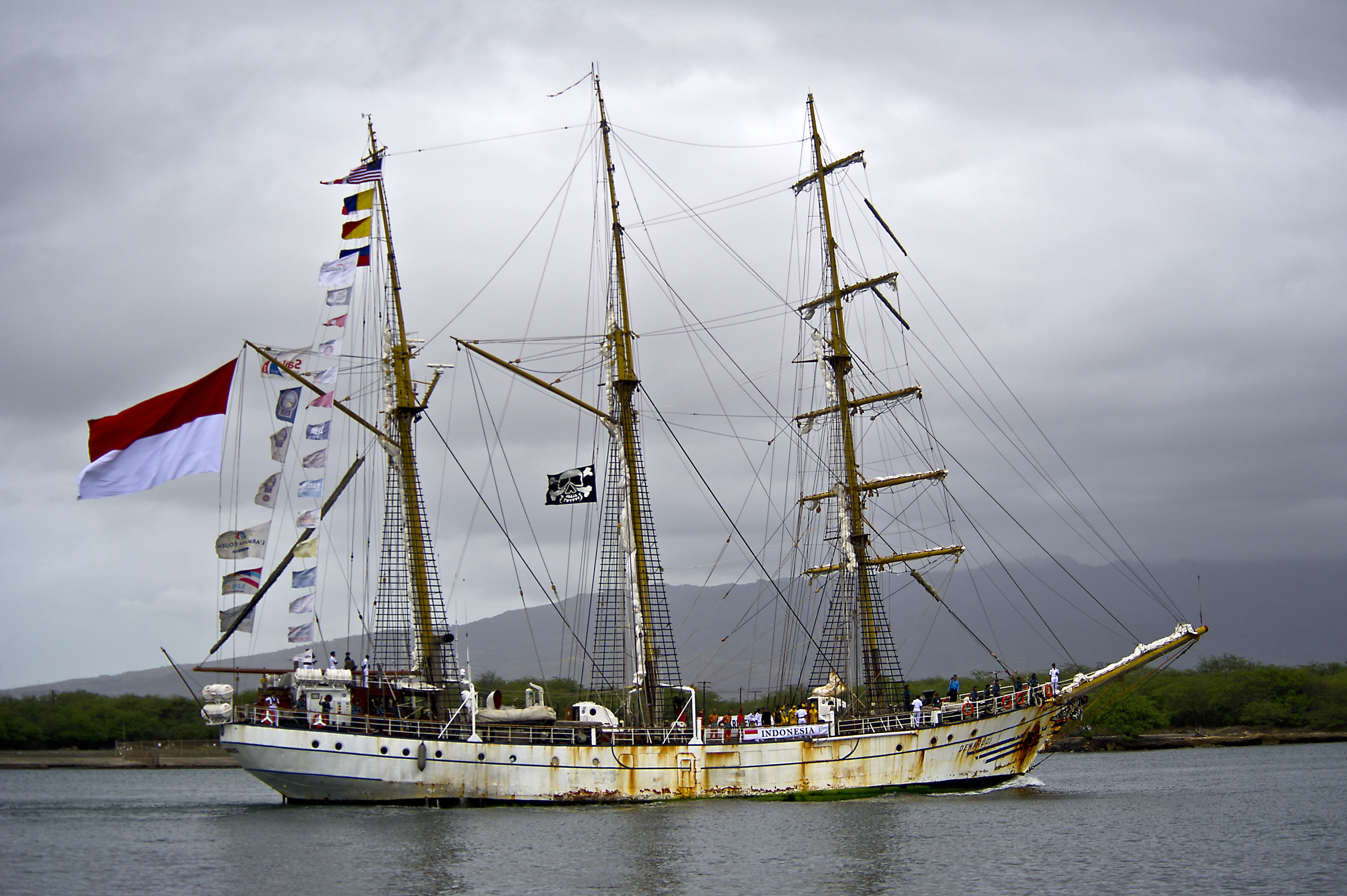
KRI Dewaruci

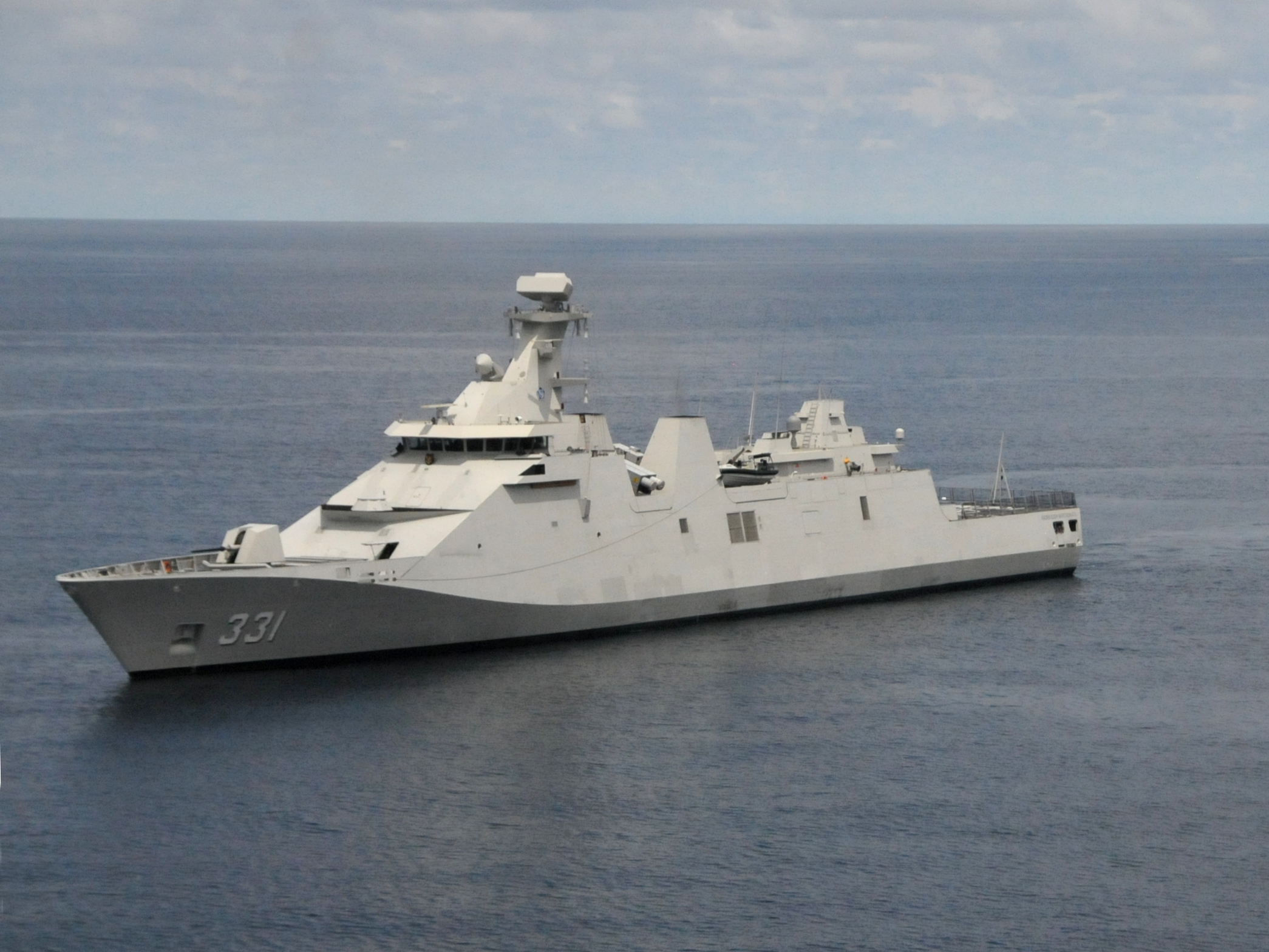
KRI Raden Eddy Martadinata

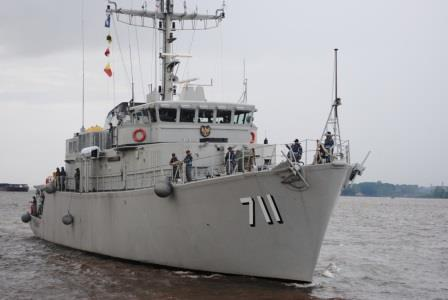
KRI Pulau Rengat

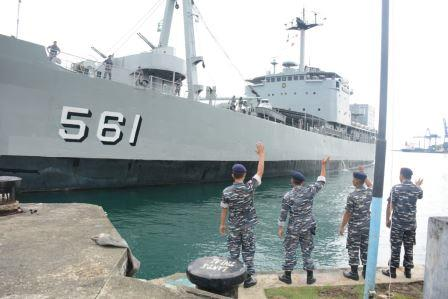
KRI Multatuli

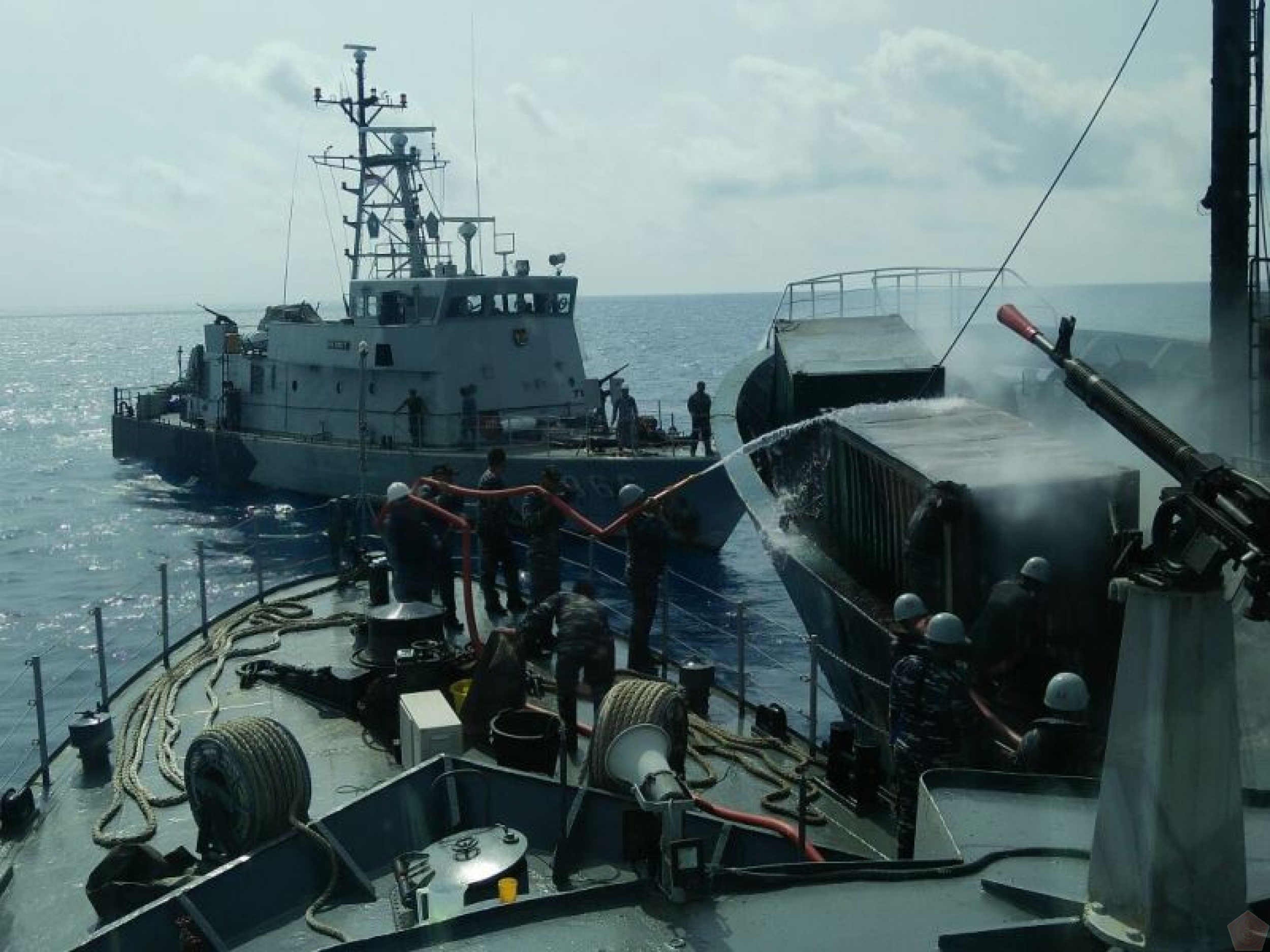
KRI Kelabang & KRI Cucut

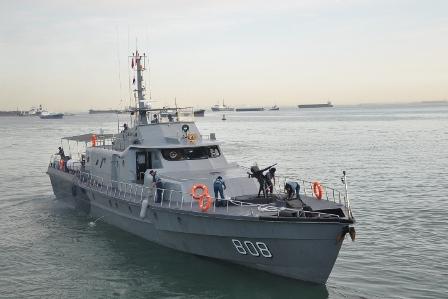
KRI Welang

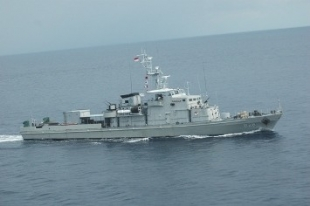
KRI Kelabang

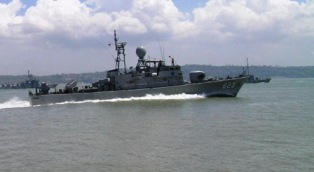
KRI Badik

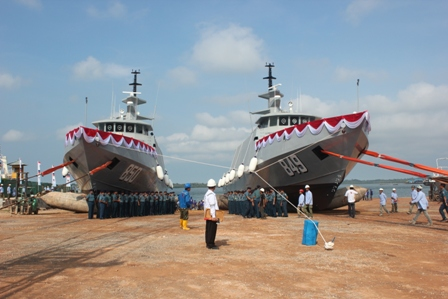
KRI Pari & KRI Sembilang

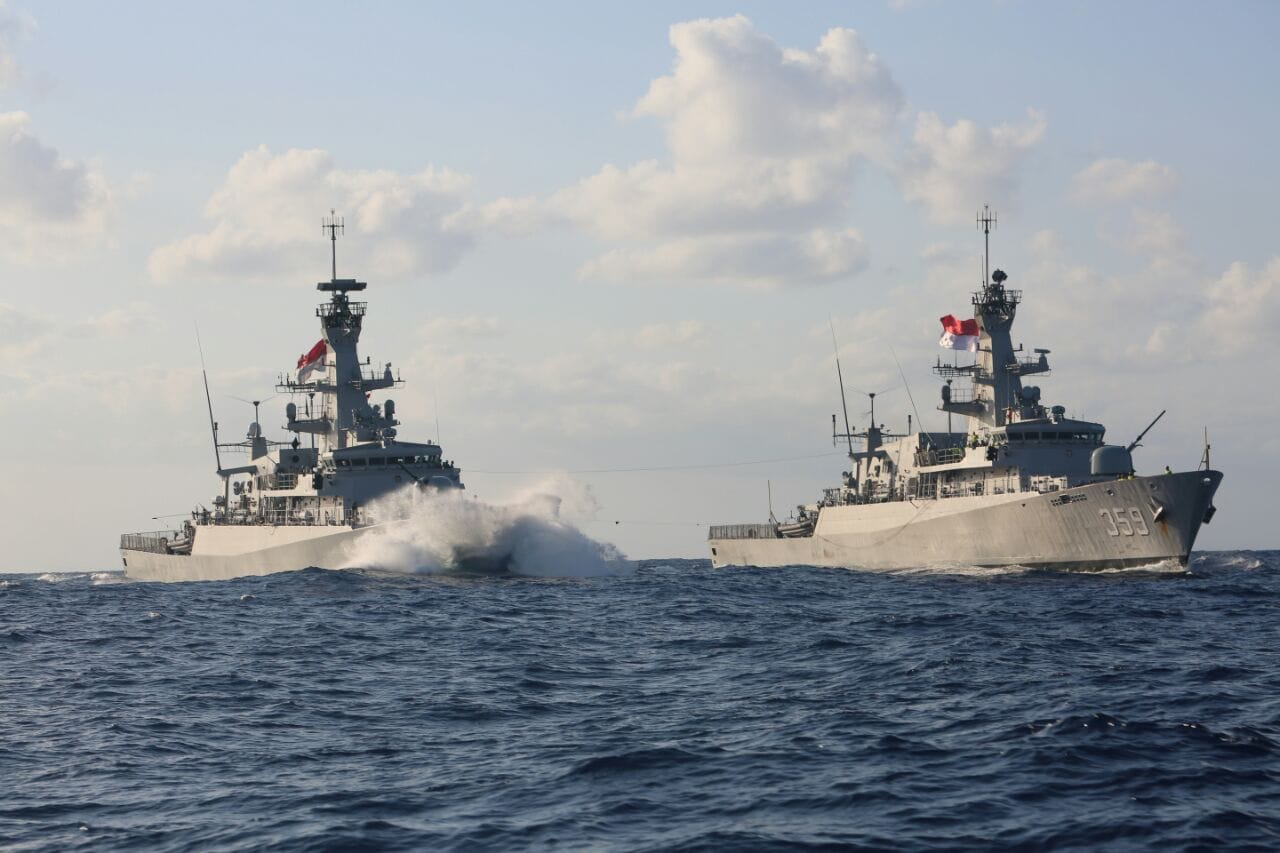
KRI Bung Tomo & KRI Usman Harun

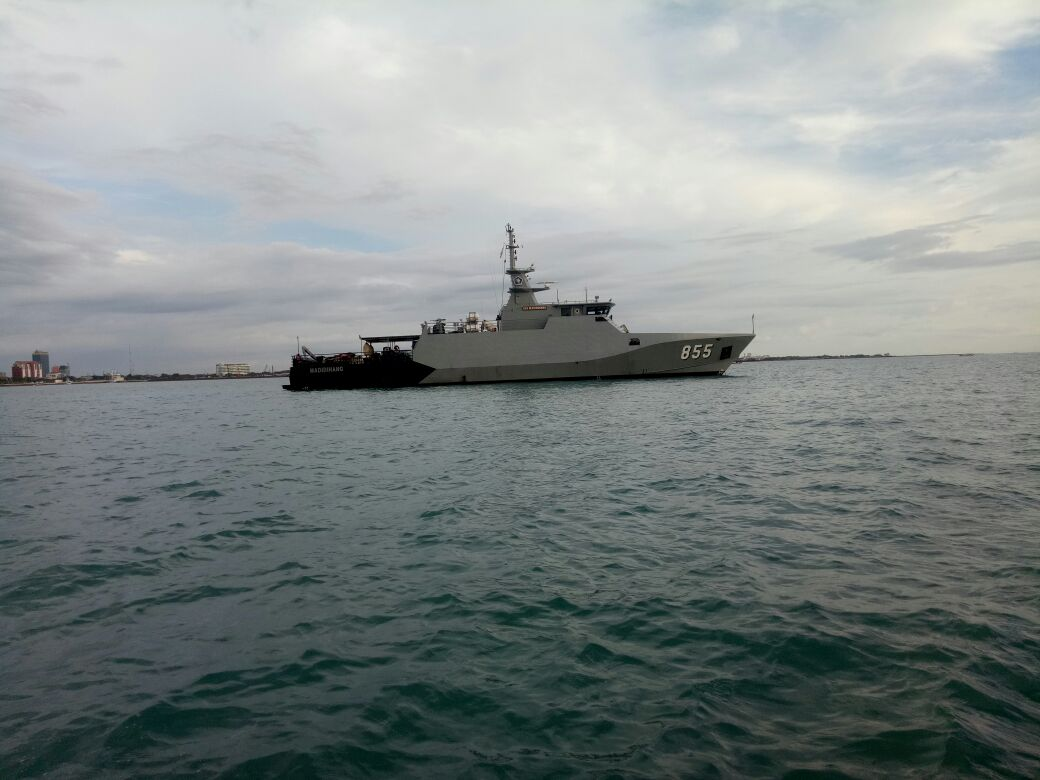
KRI Madidihang

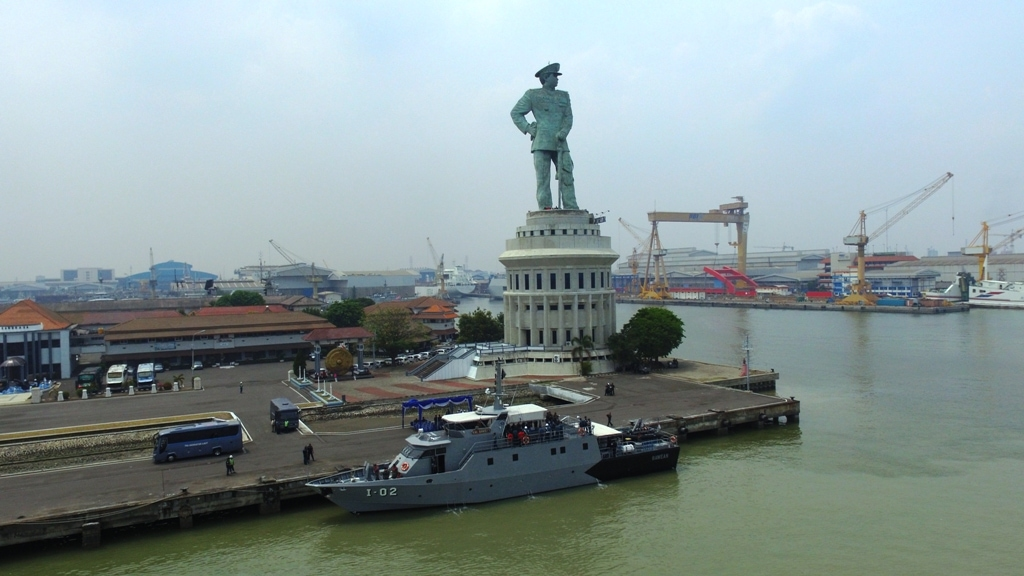
KAL Bawean

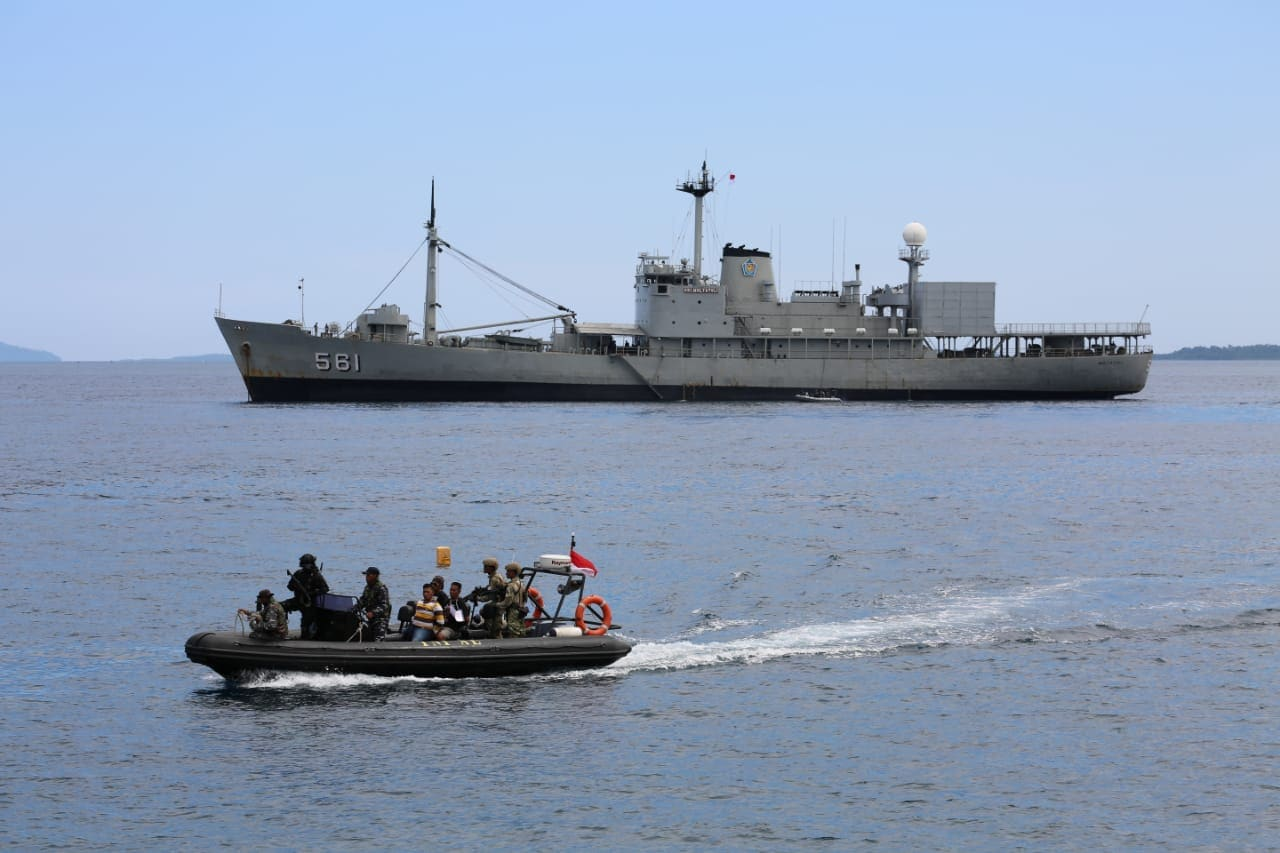
KRI Multatuli

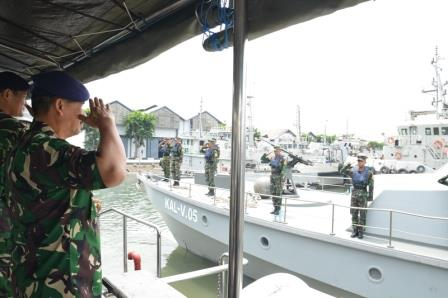
KAL Kadet-5

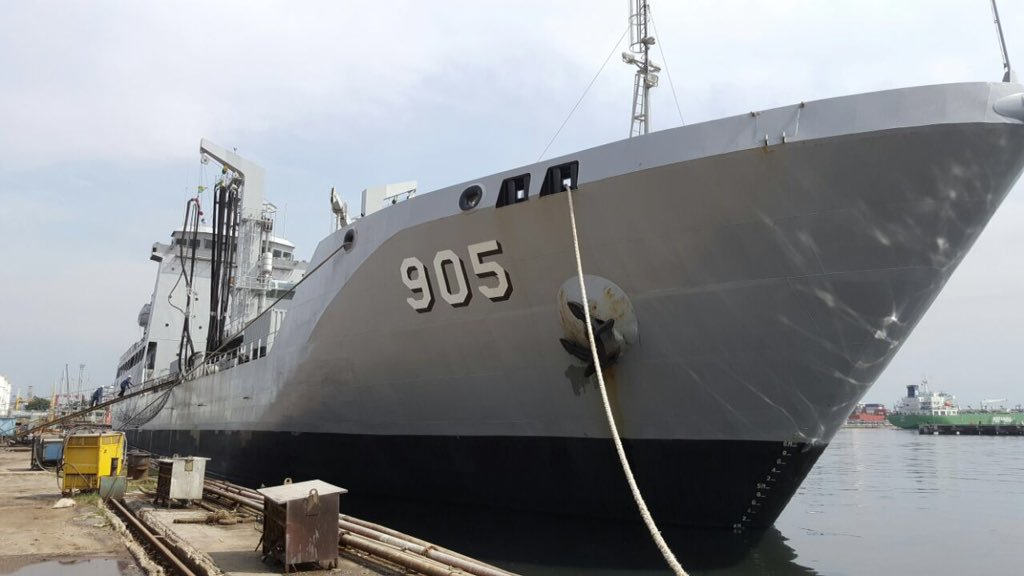
KRI Tarakan

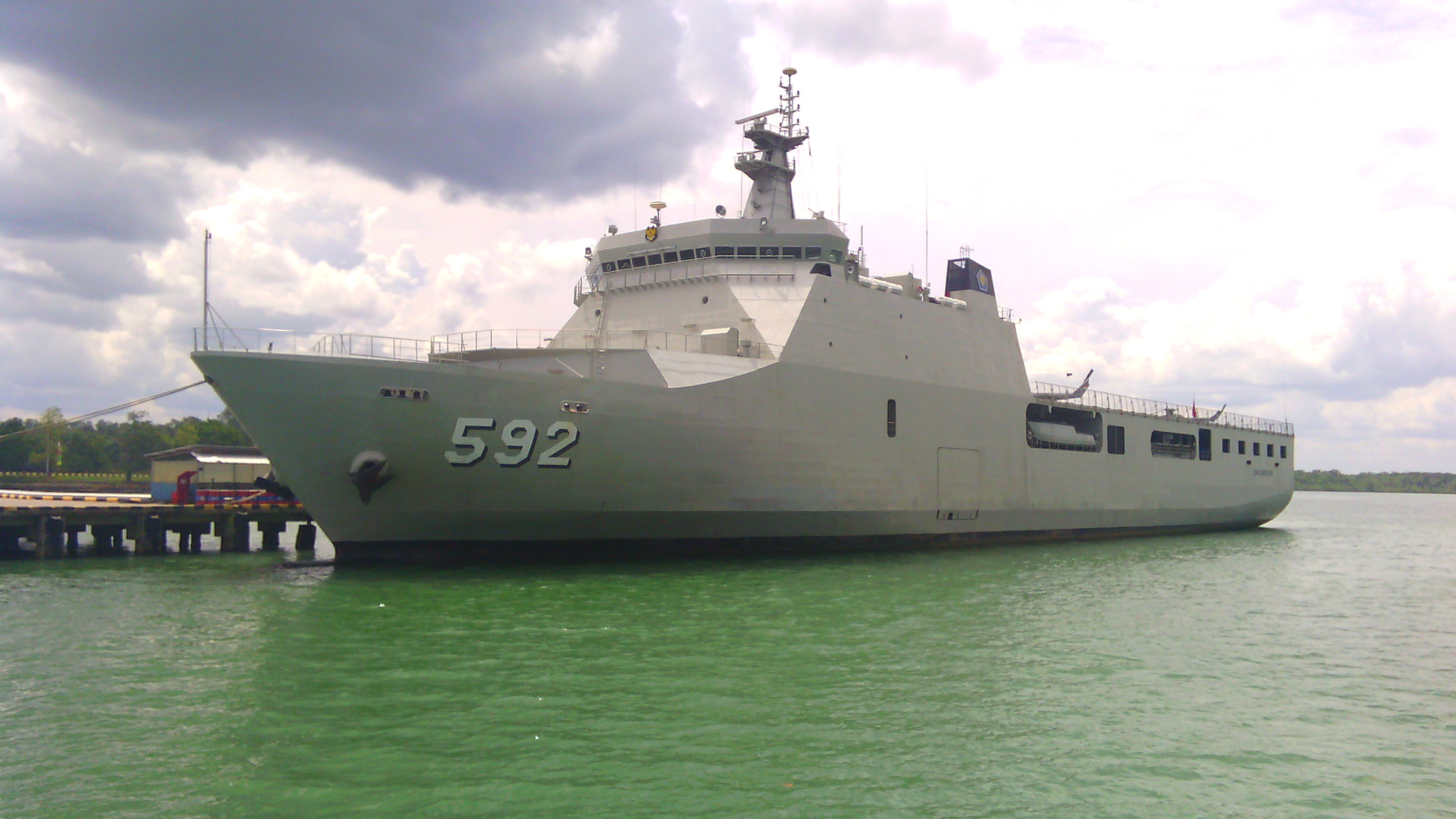
KRI Banjarmasin

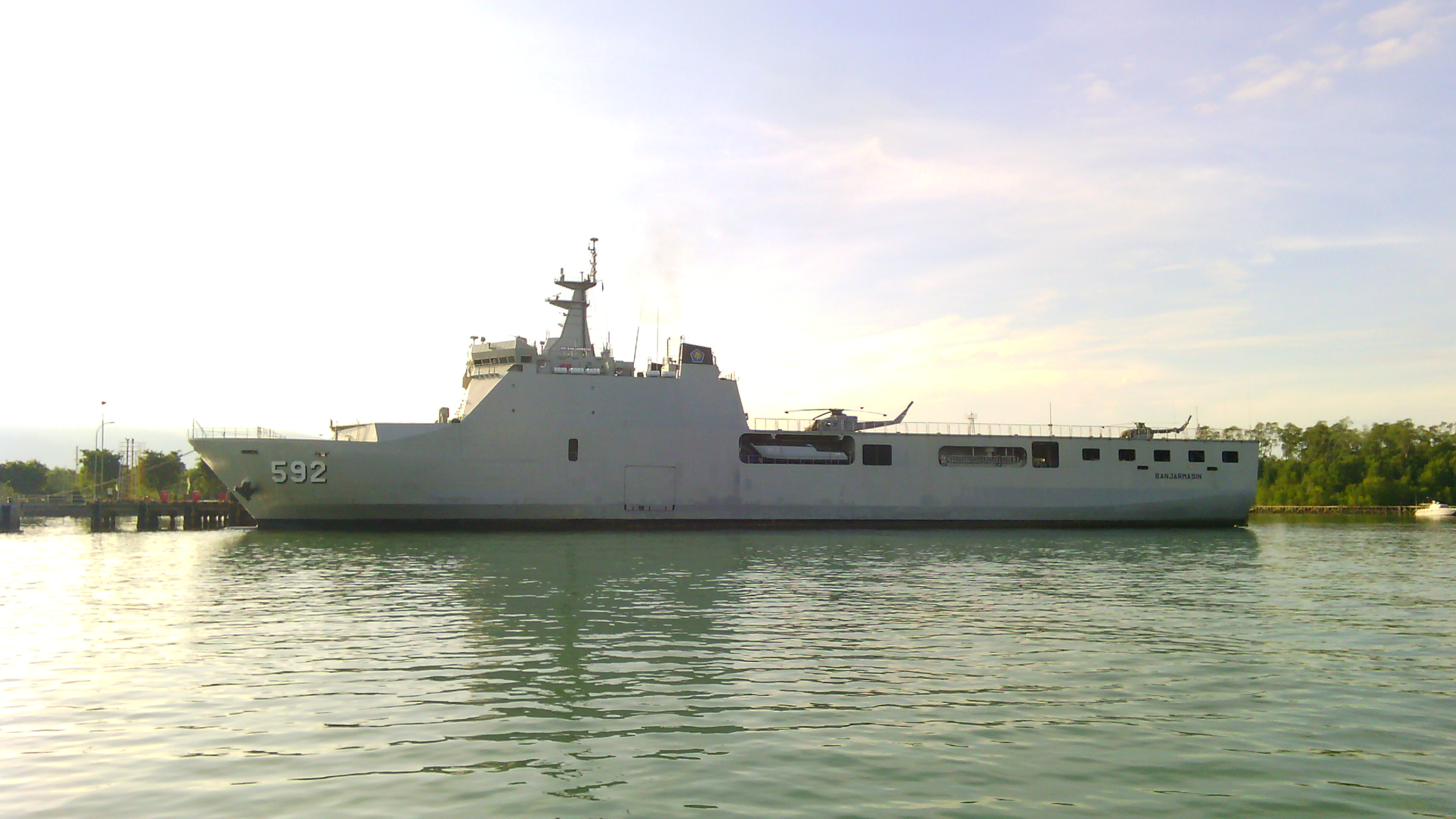
KRI Banjarmasin

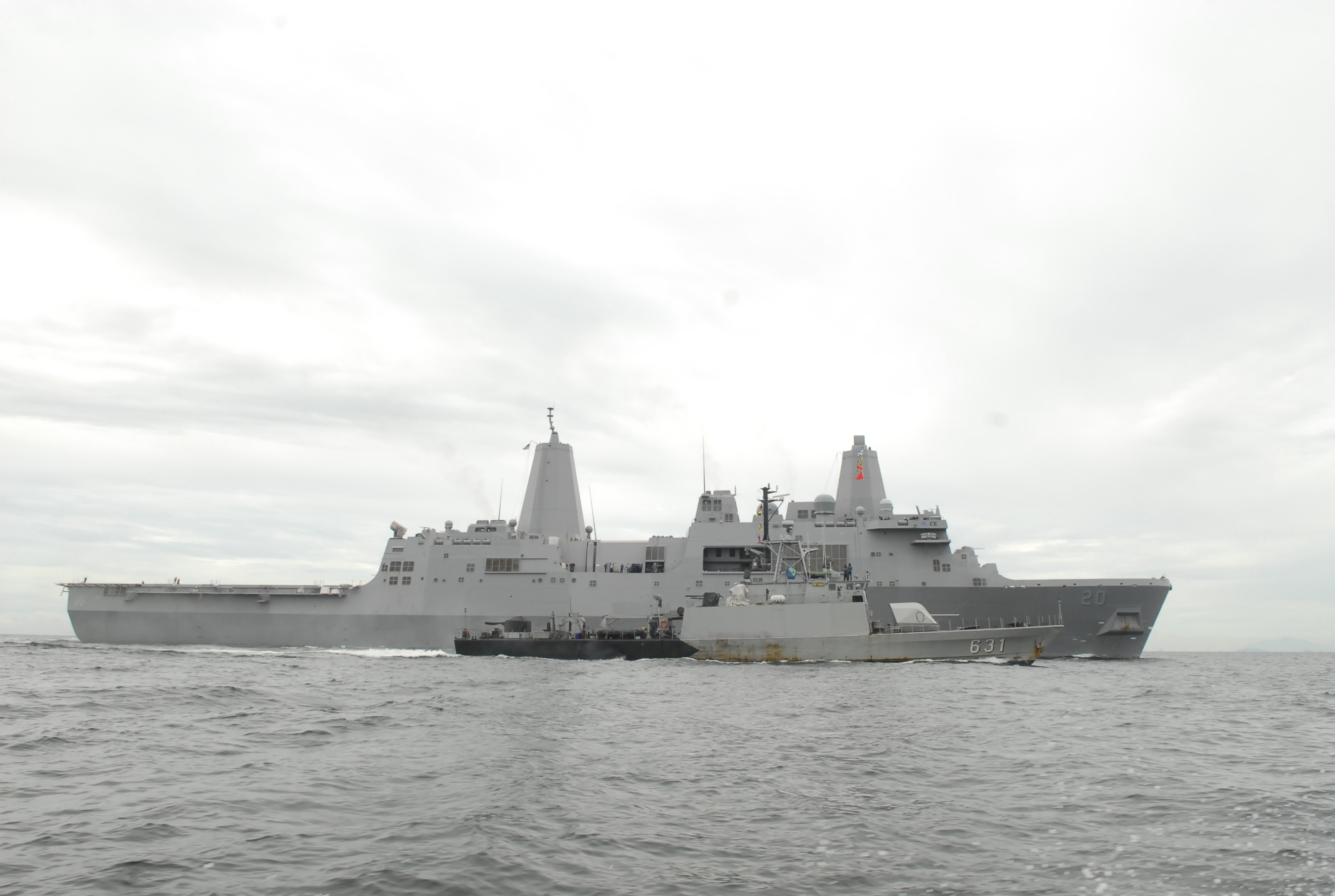
KRI Todak

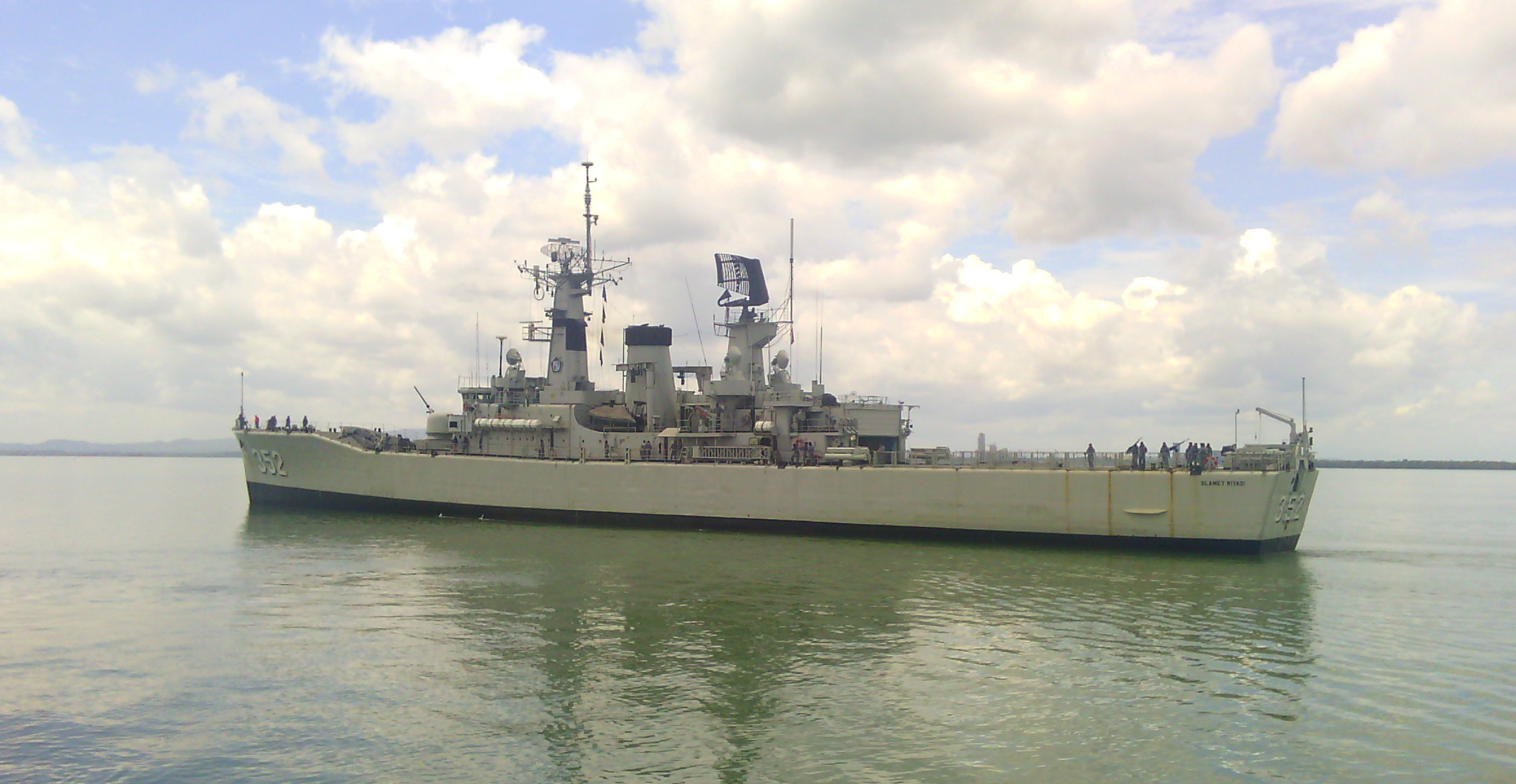
KRI Slamet Riyadi

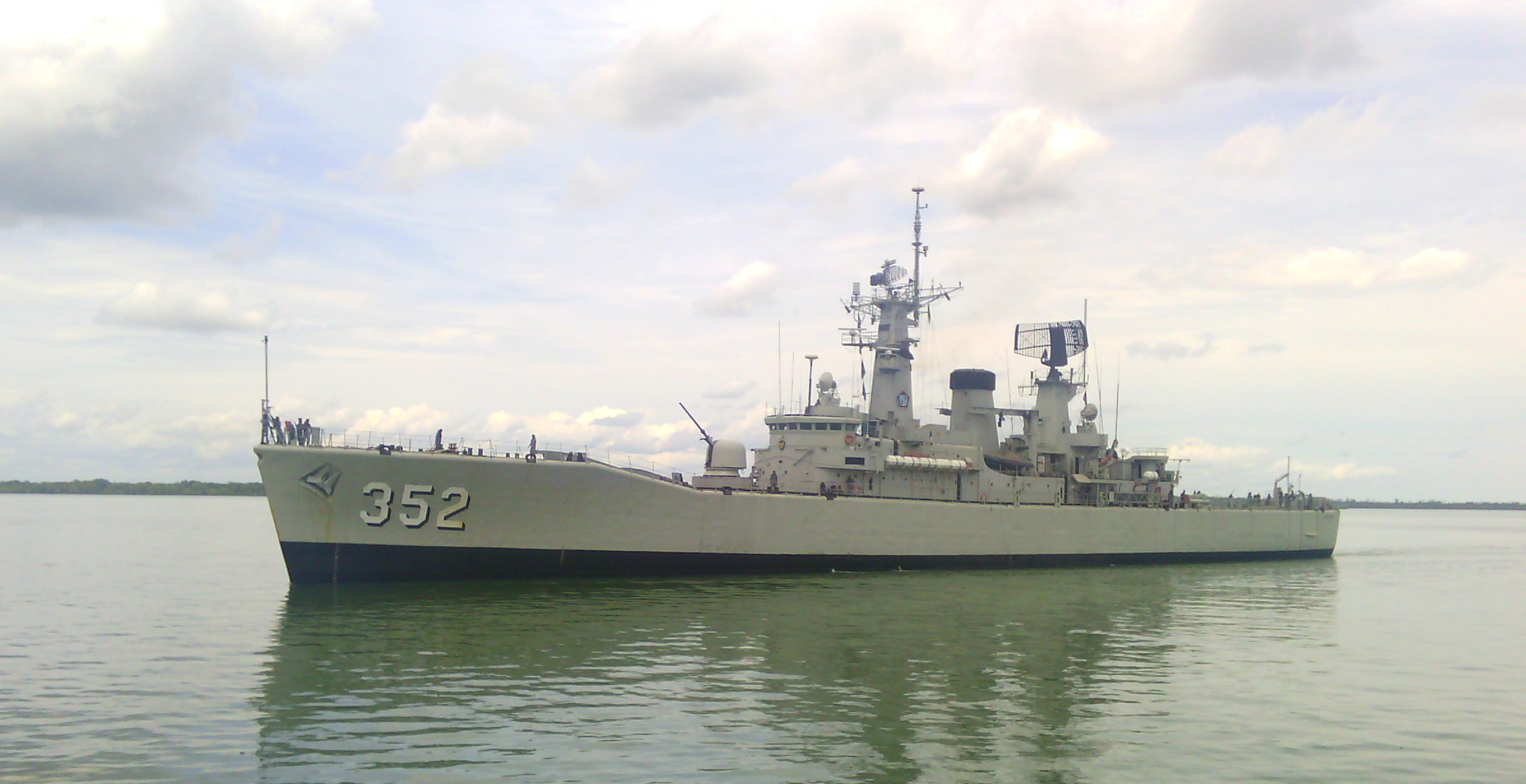
KRI Slamet Riyadi

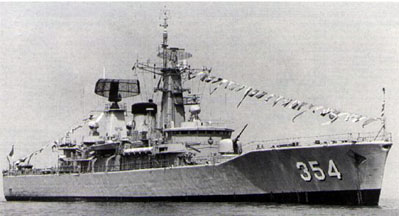
KRI Yos Sudarso

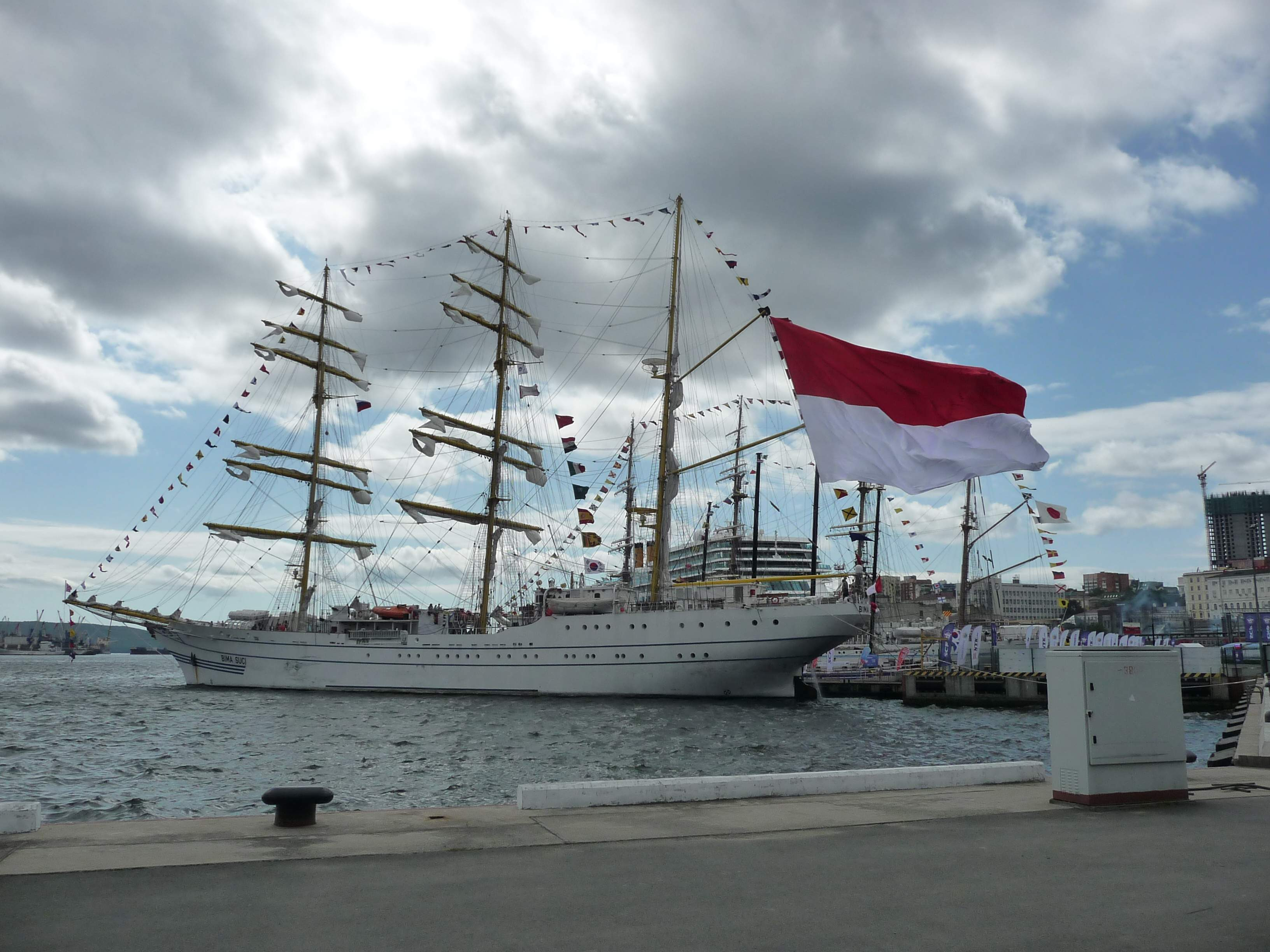
KRI Bima Suci

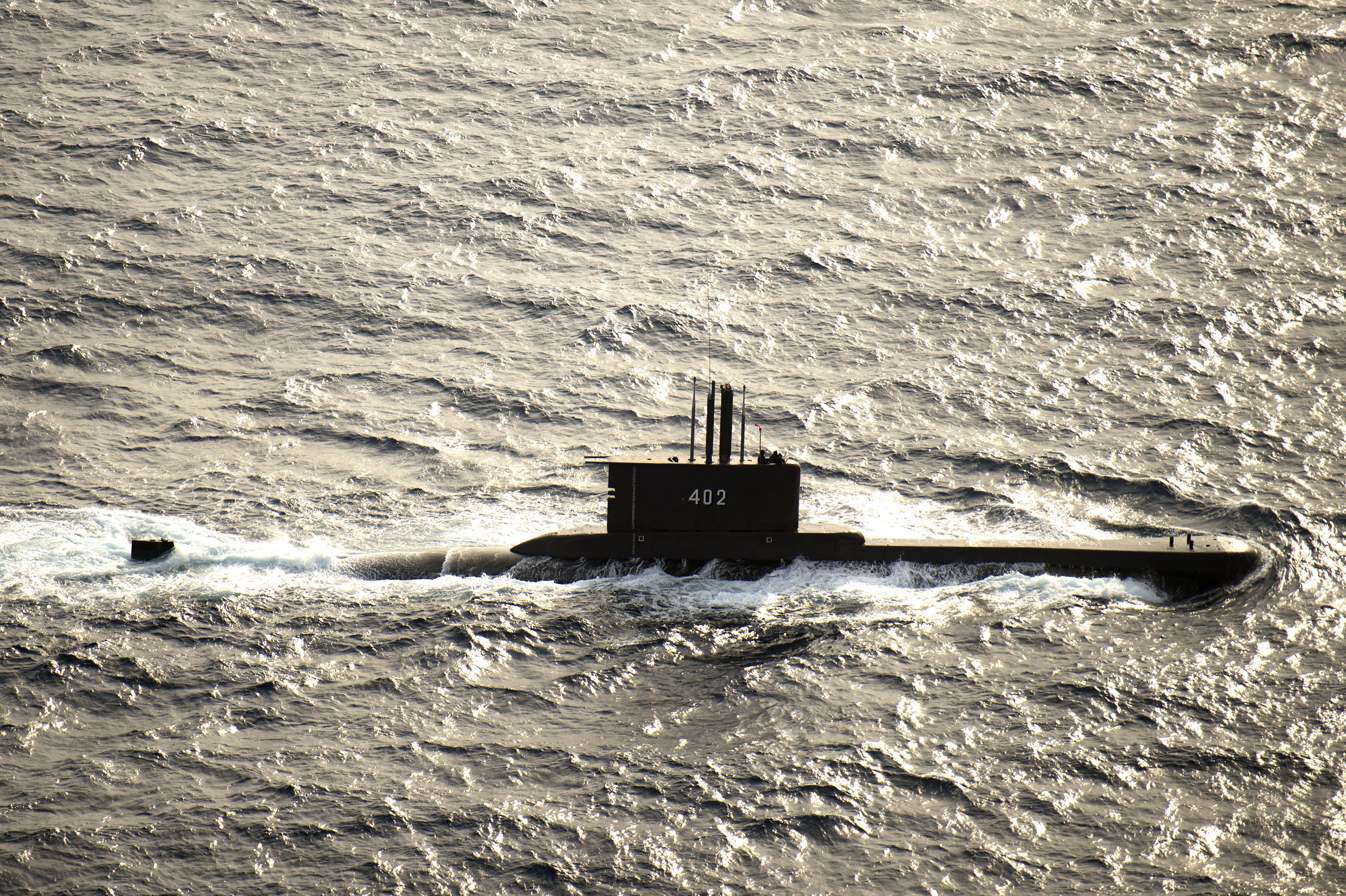
KRI Nanggala

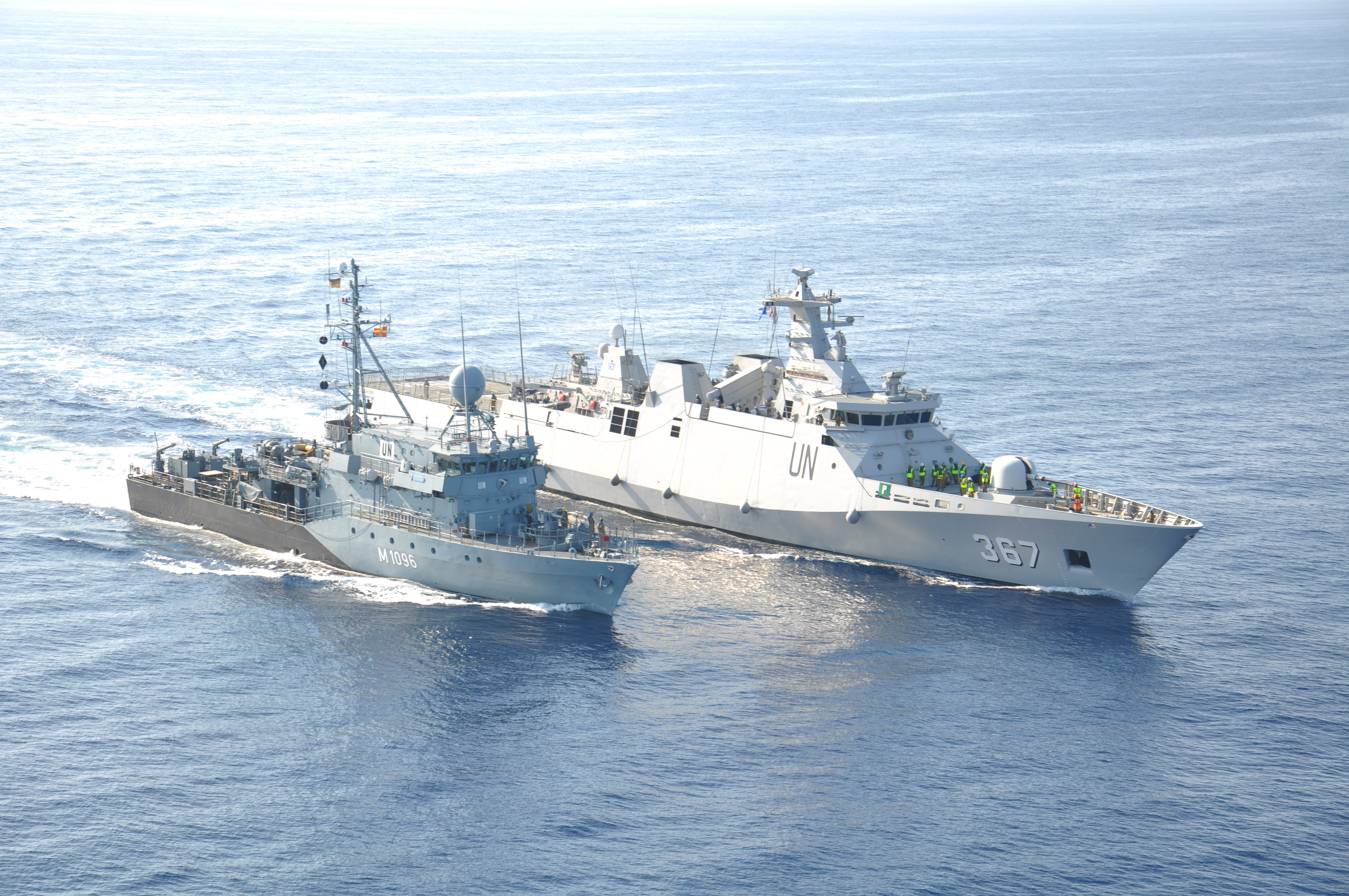
KRI Sultan Iskandar Muda

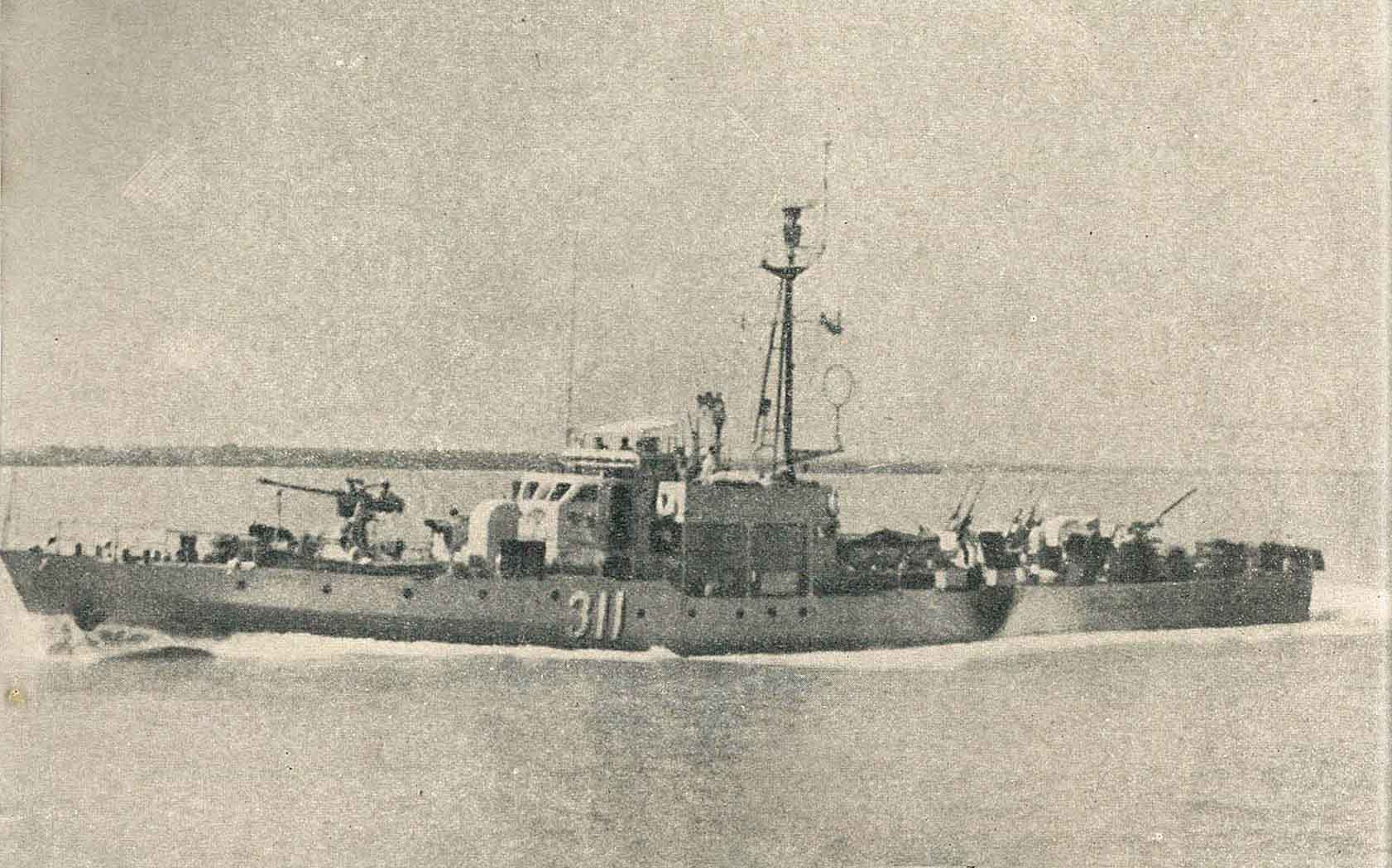
RI Dorang

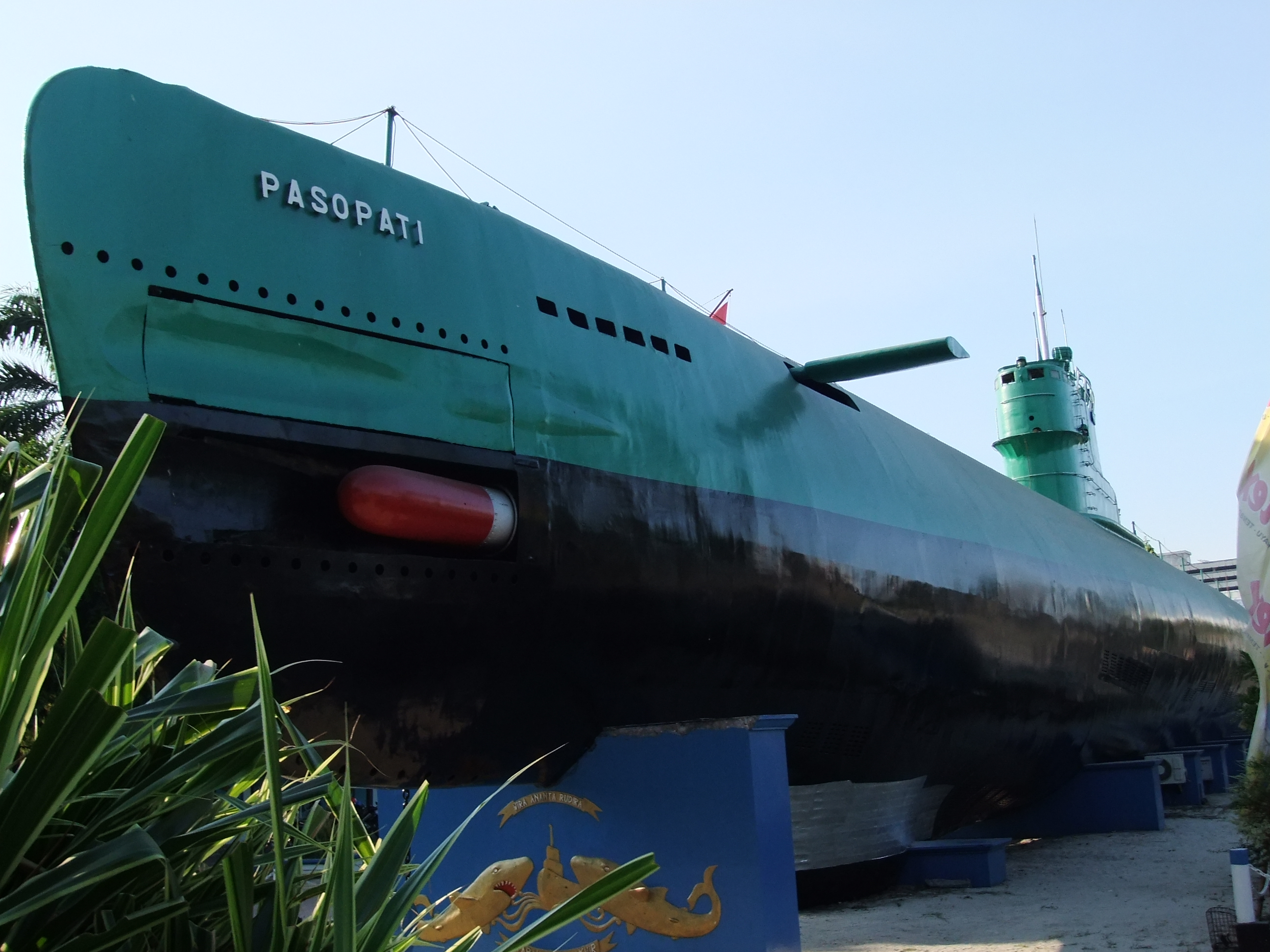
KRI Pasopati

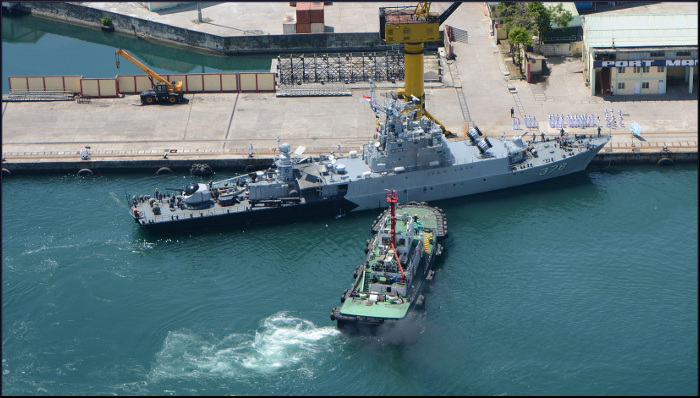
KRI Sutedi Senoputra

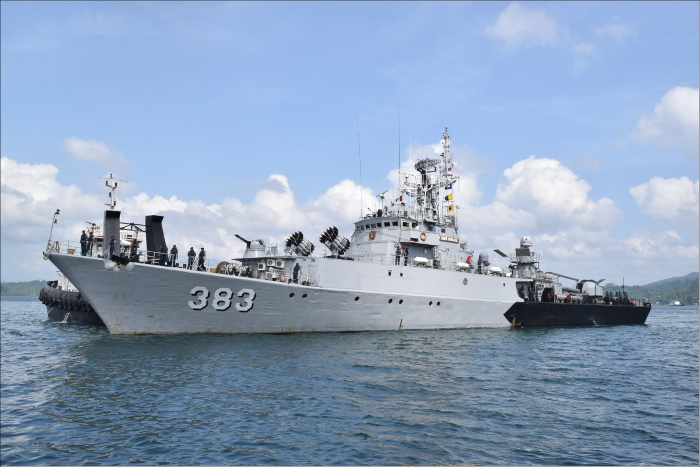
KRI Imam Bonjol

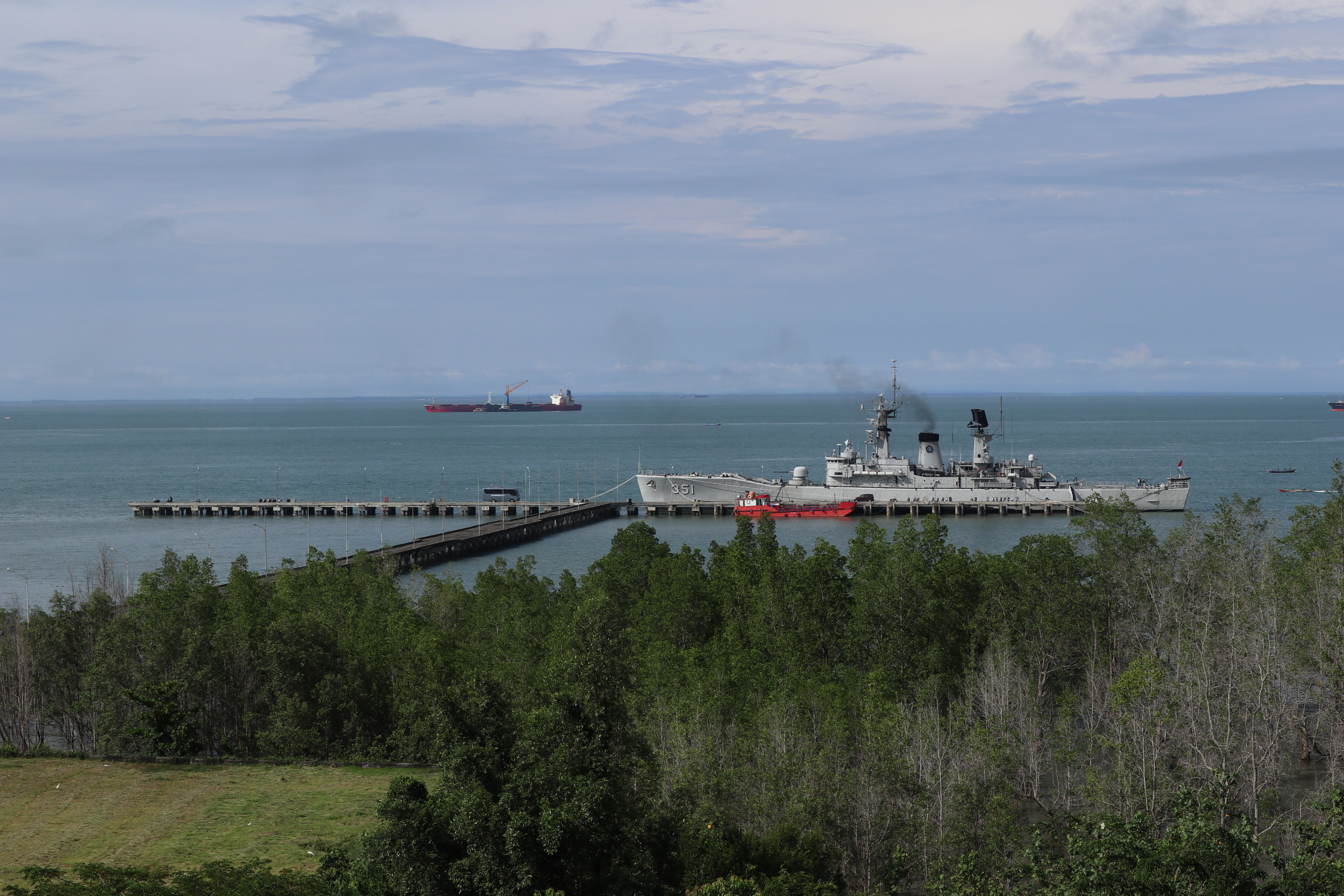
KRI Ahmad Yani

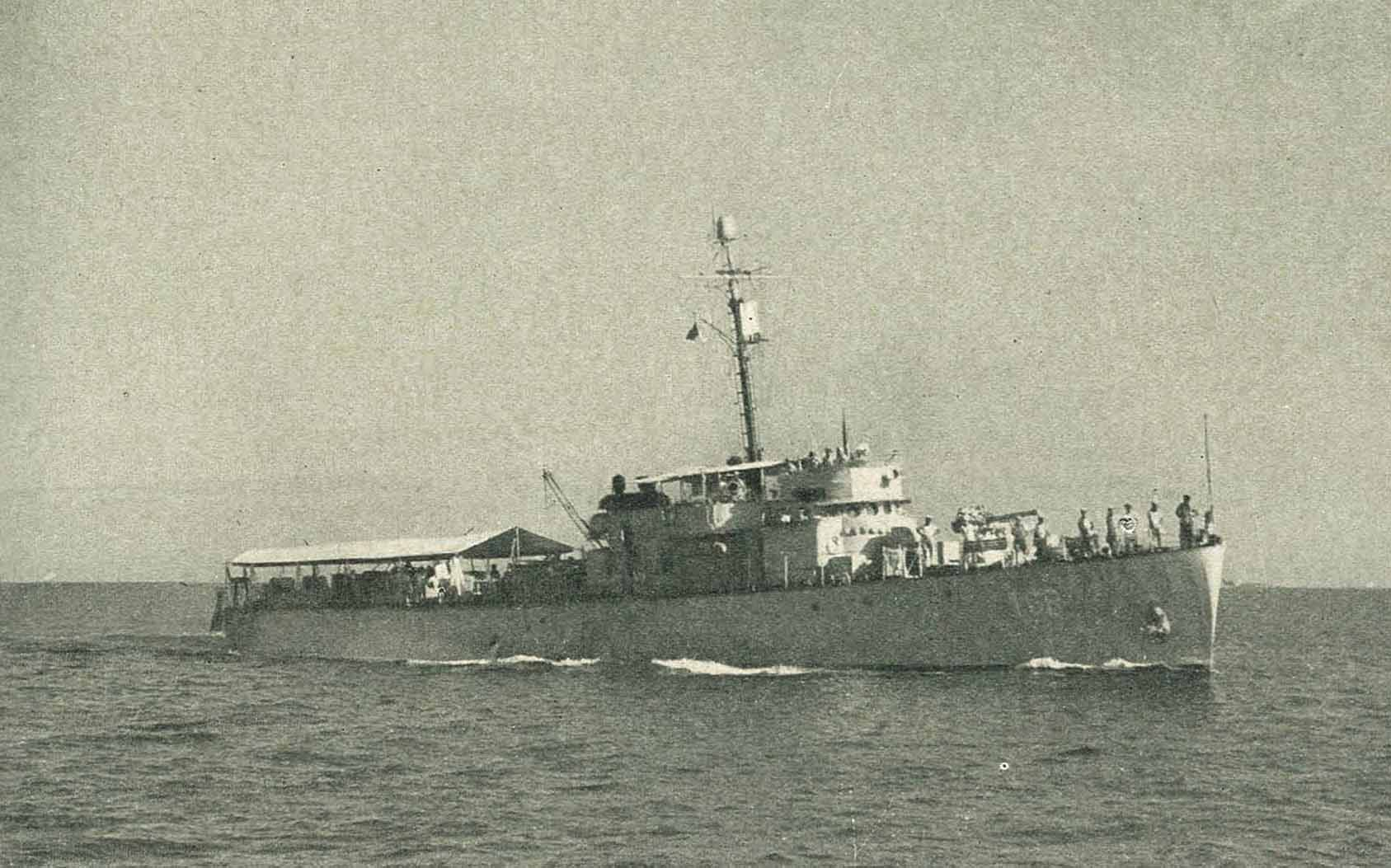
RI Tengiri

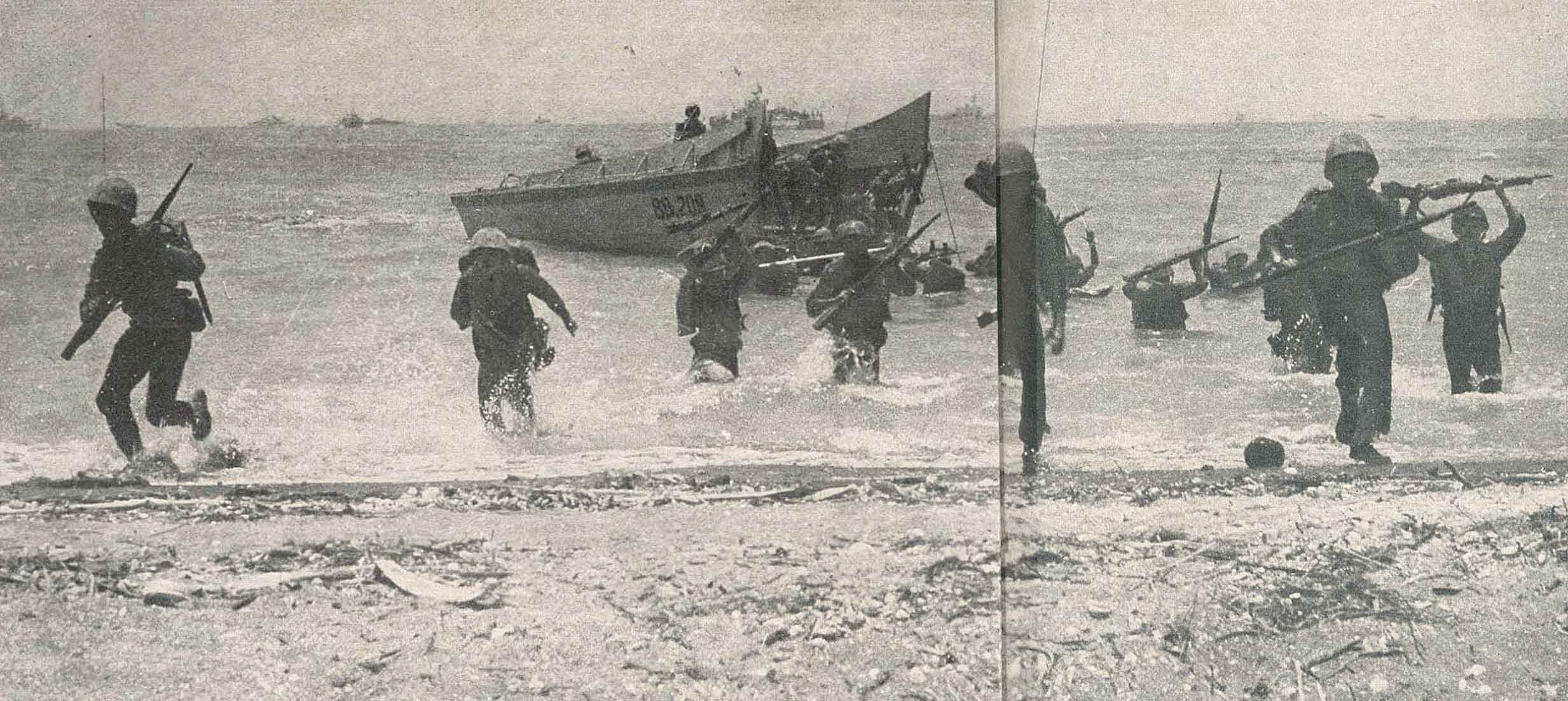
LCVP

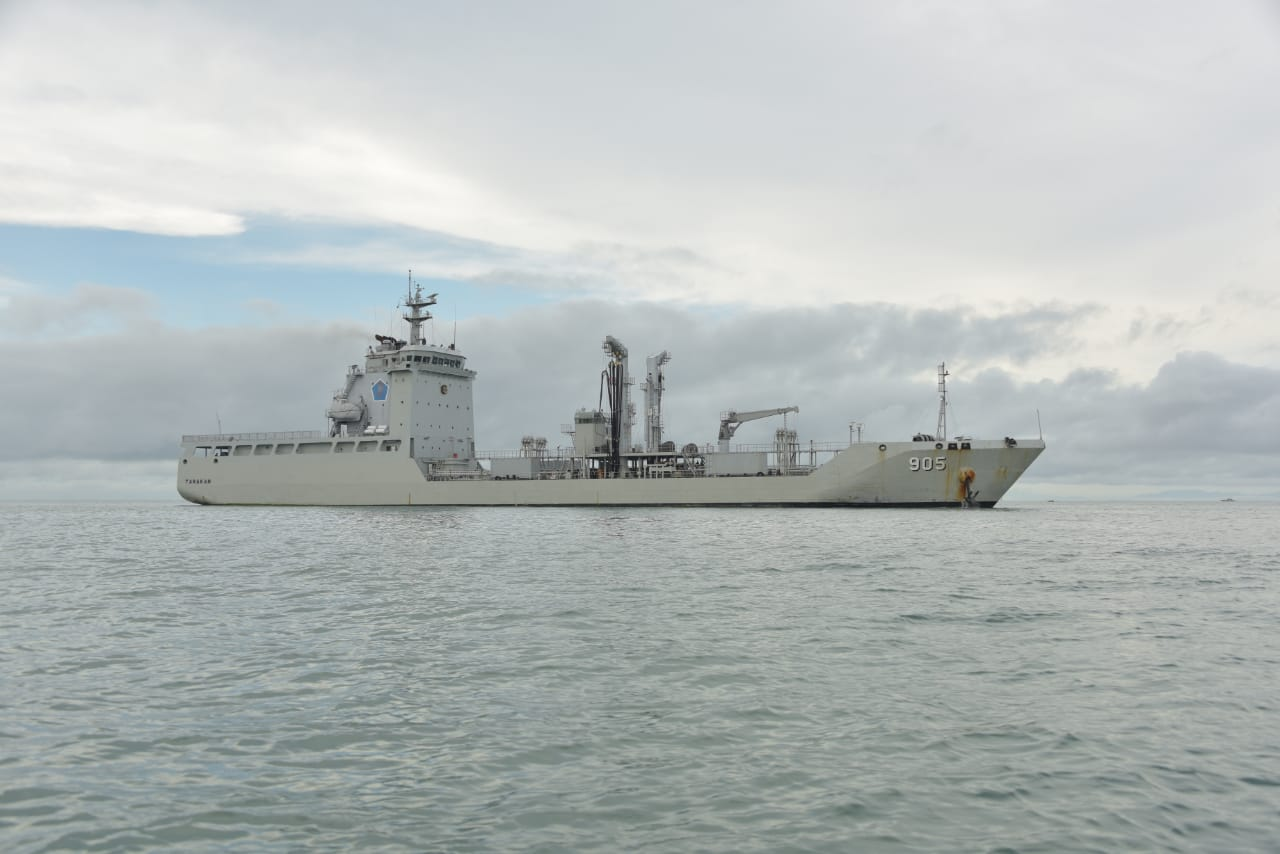
KRI Tarakan

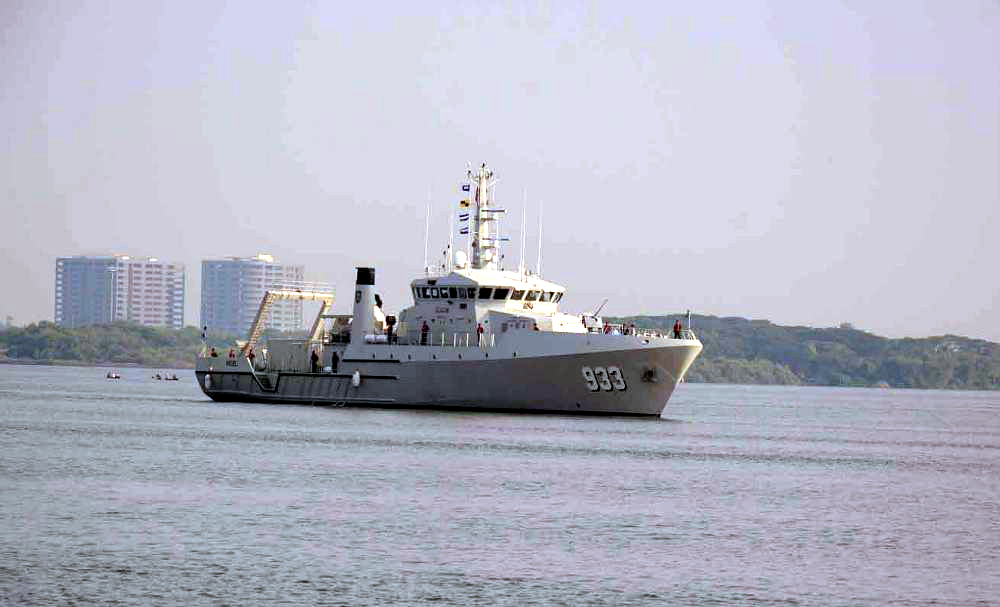
KRI Rigel

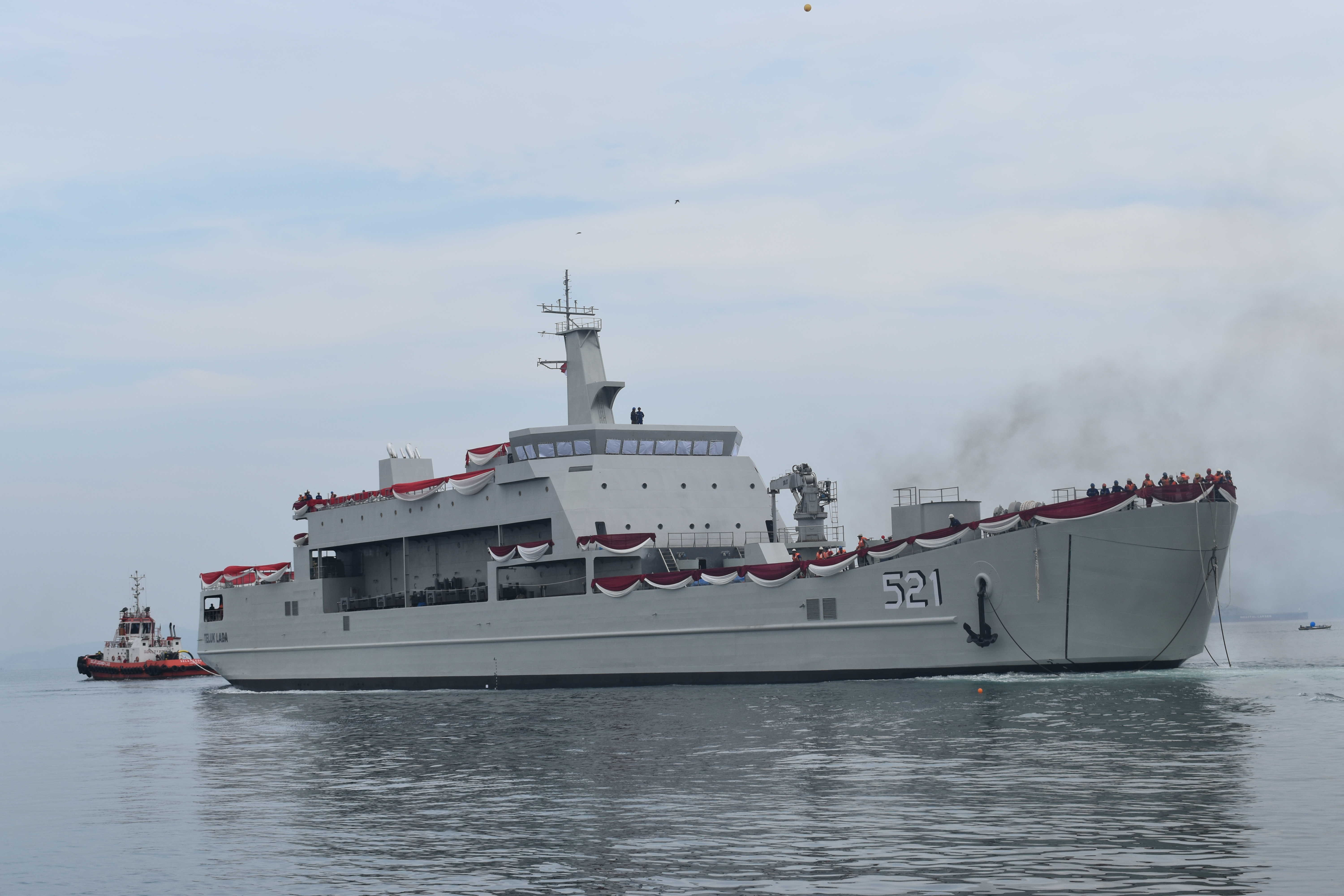
KRI Teluk Lada

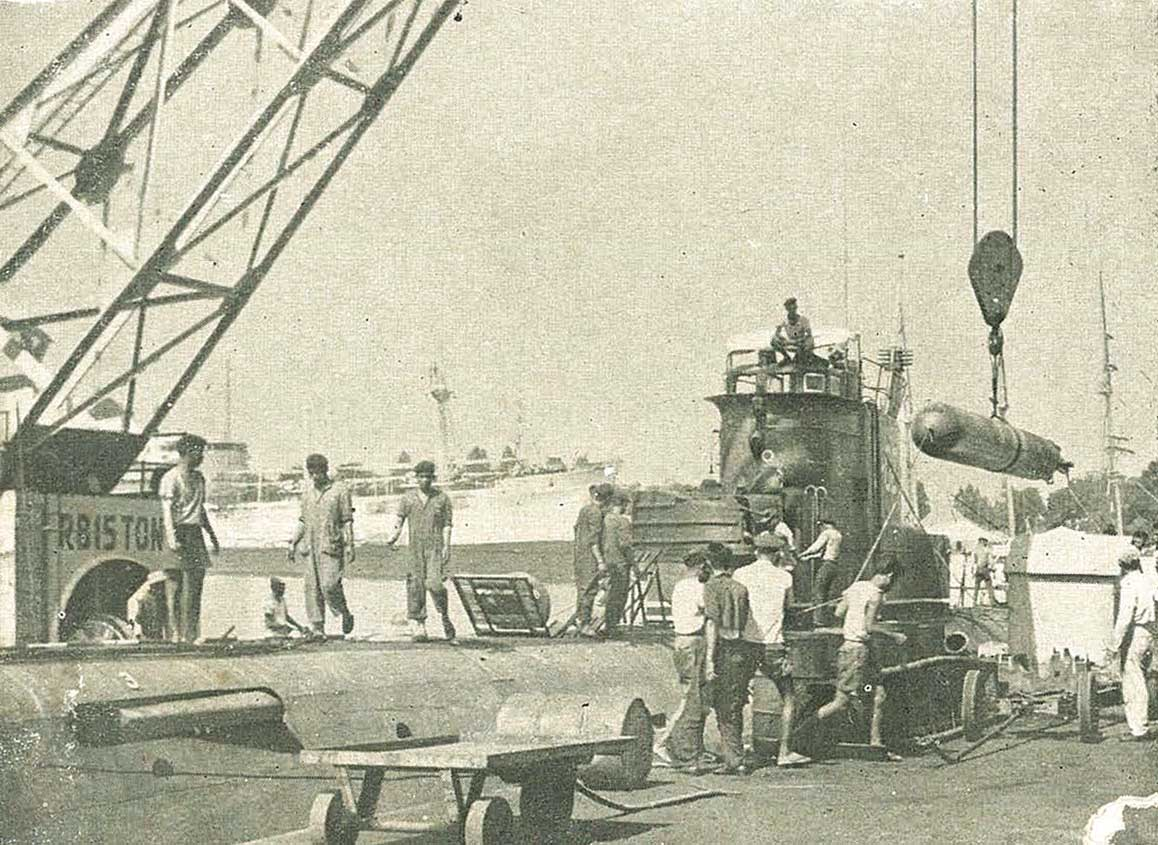
RI Nanggala

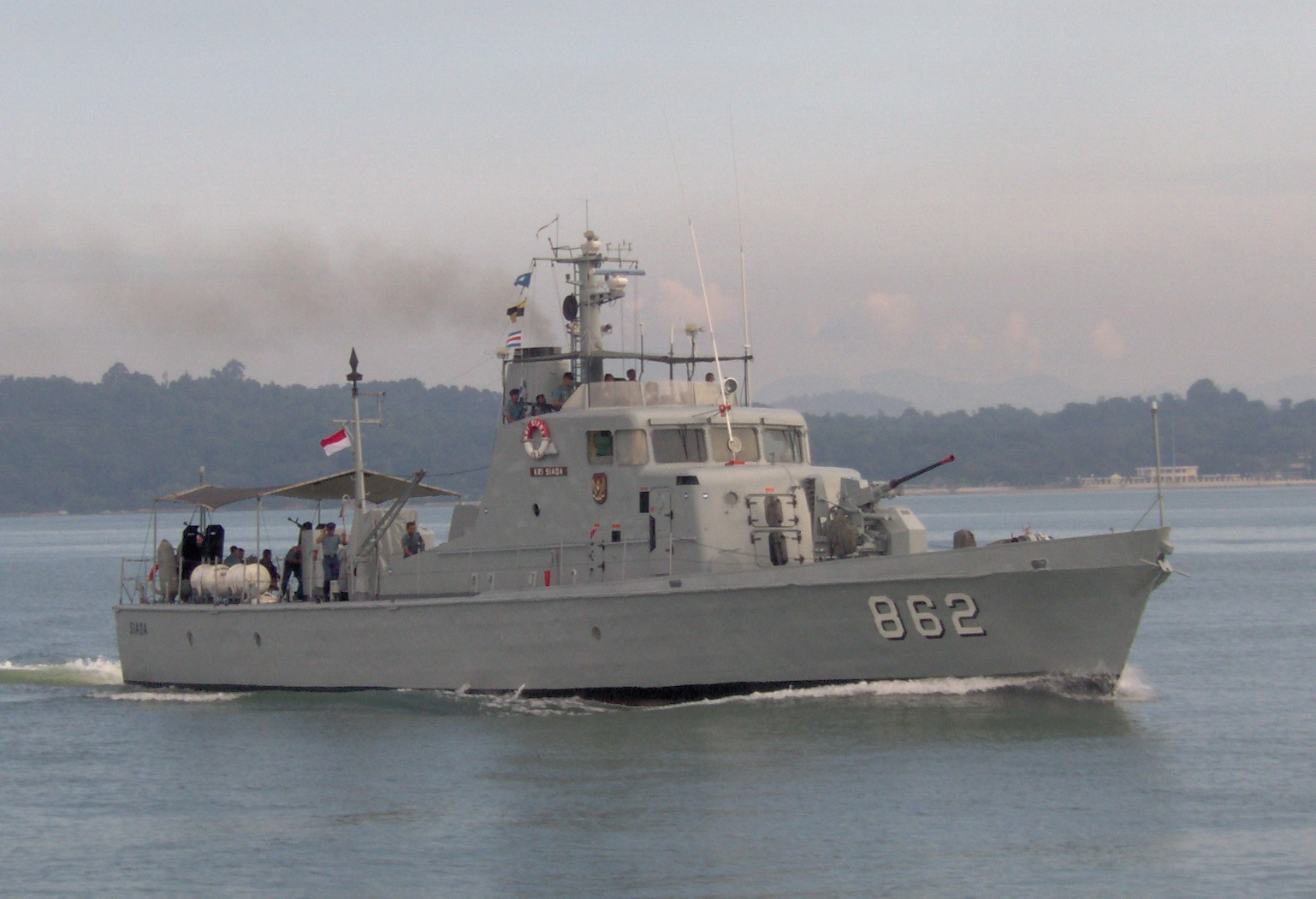
KRI Siada

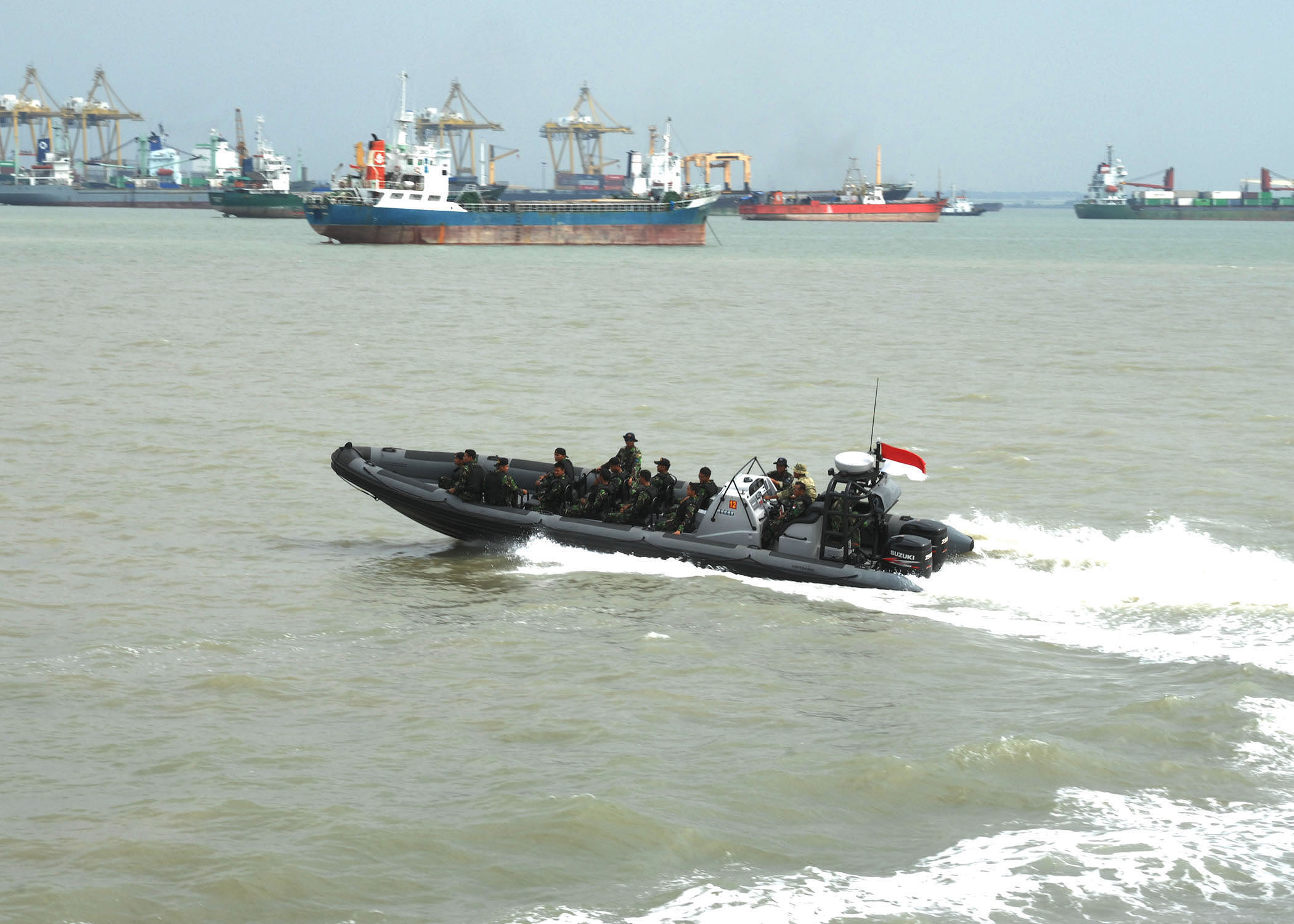
VBSS RHIB

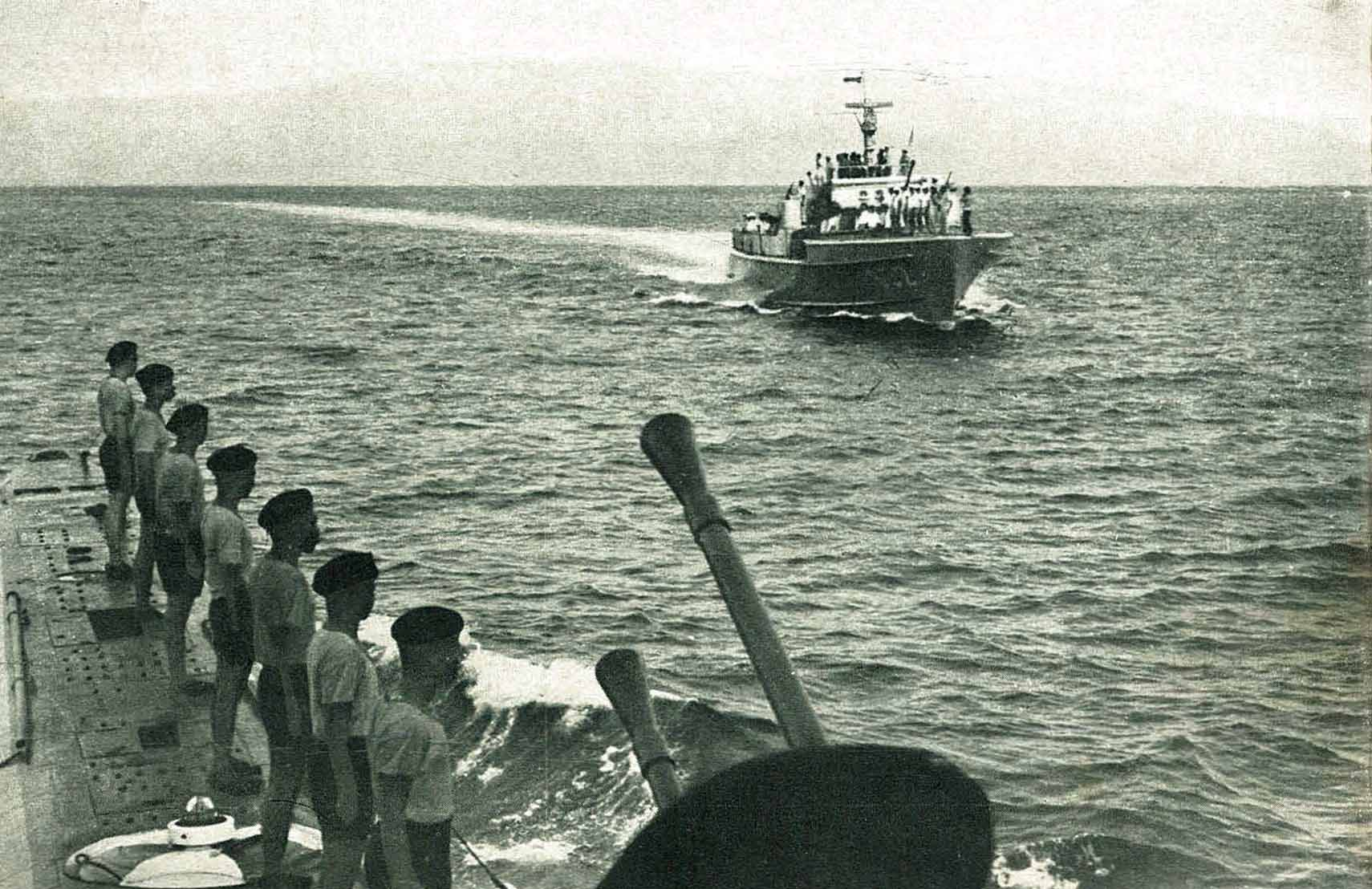
RI Anoa

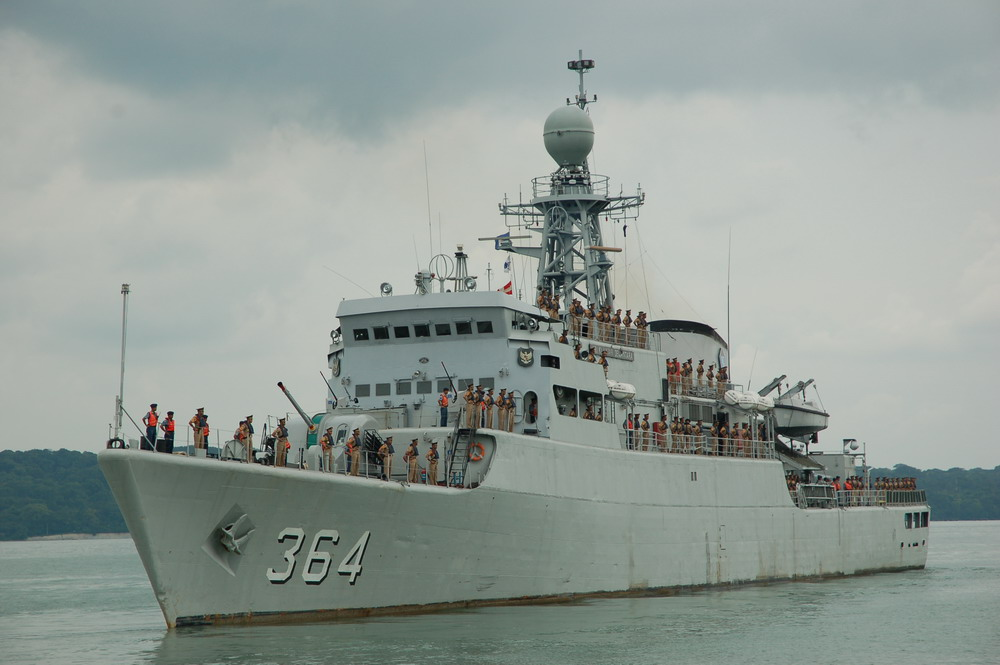
KRI Ki Hajar Dewantara

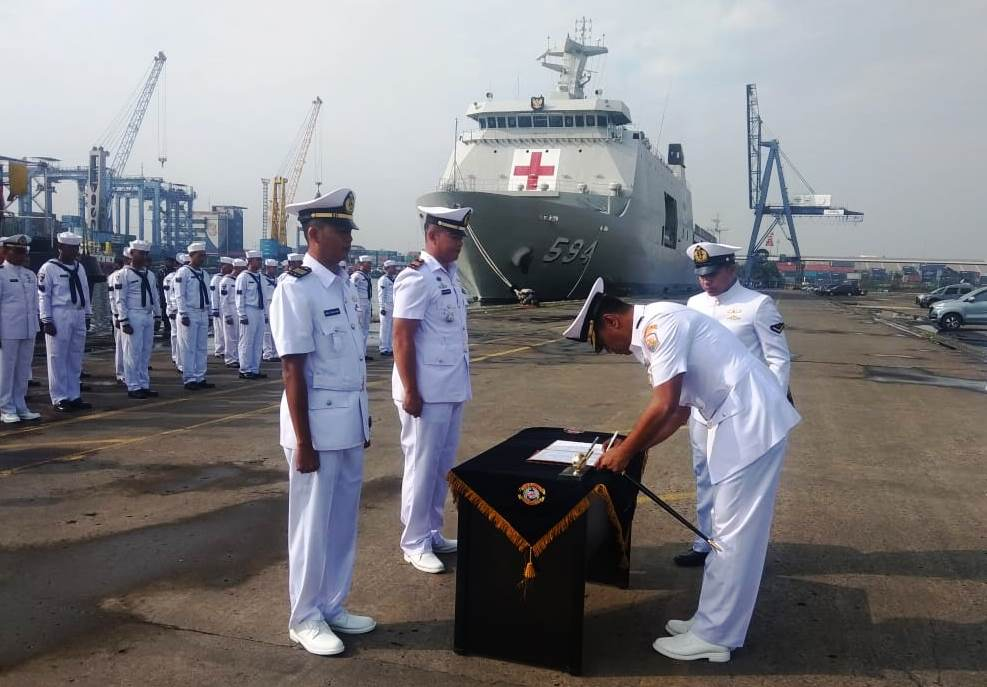
KRI Semarang

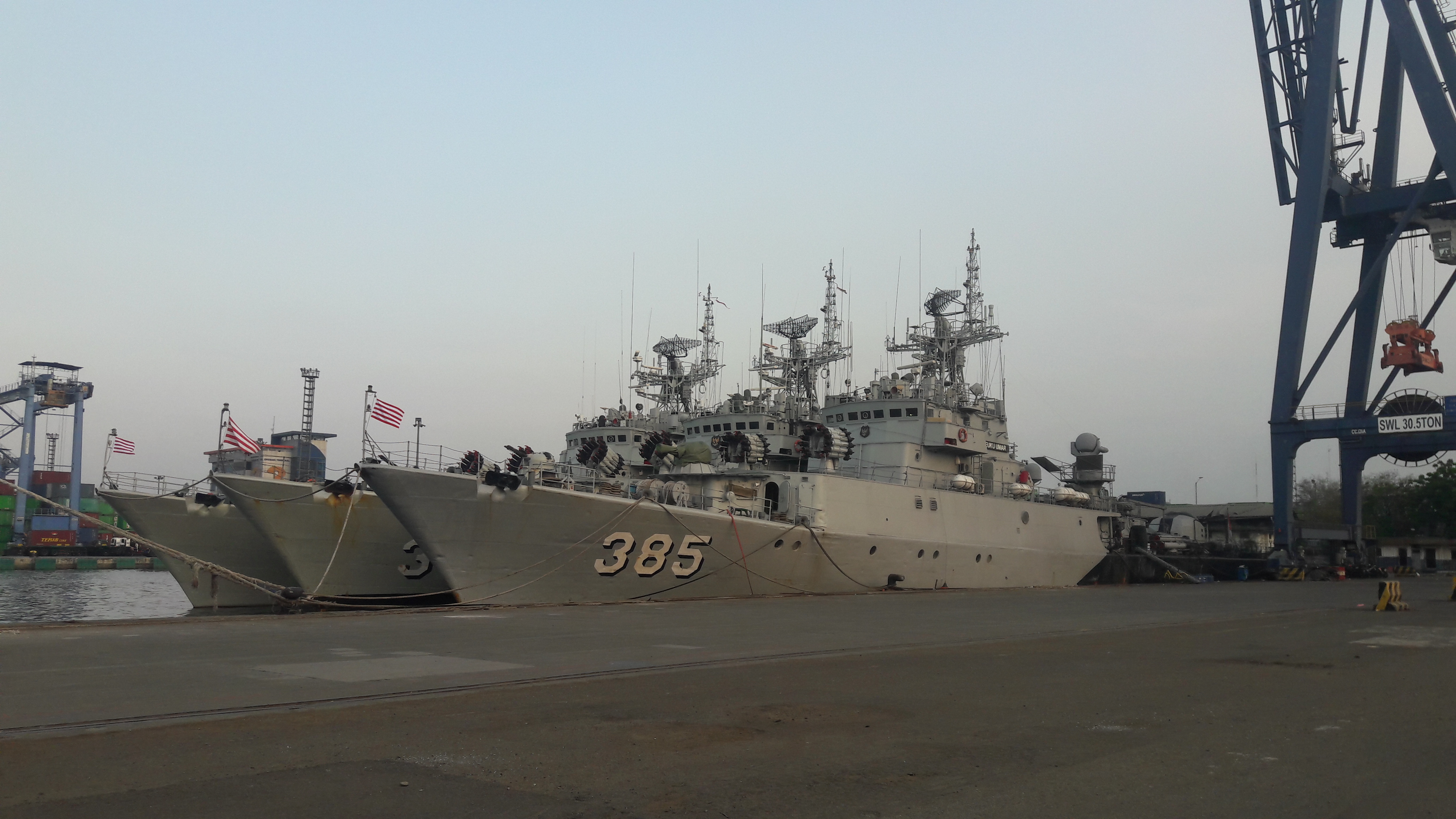
KRI Teuku Umar

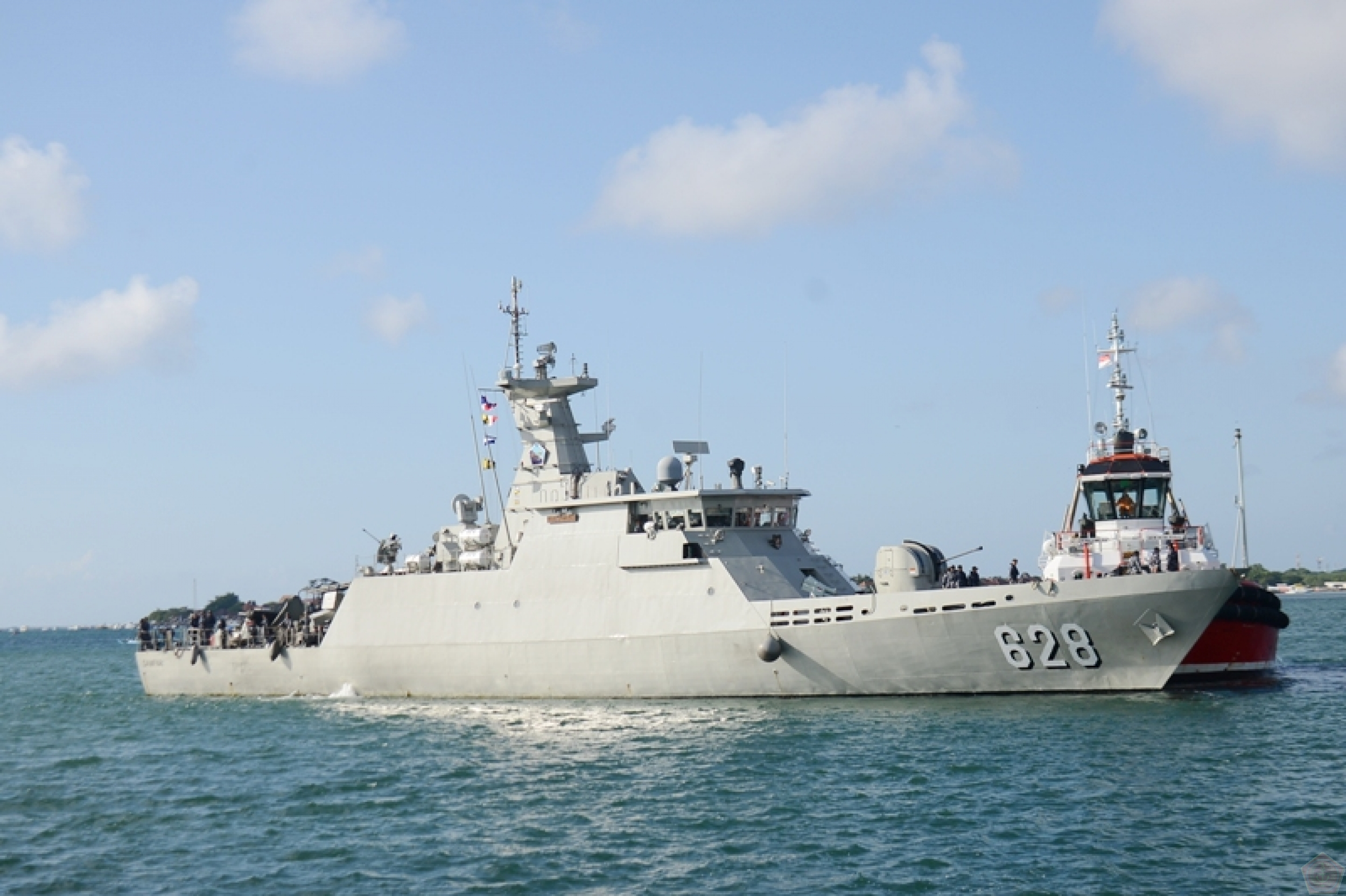
KRI Sampari

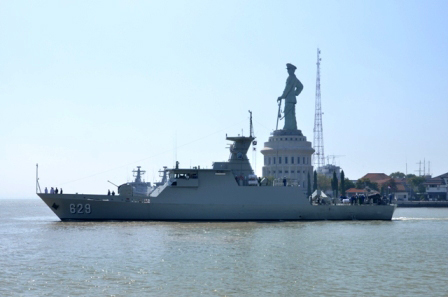
KRI Tombak

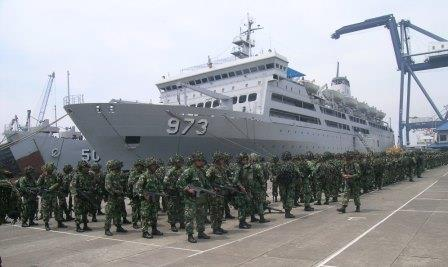
KRI Tanjung Nusanive

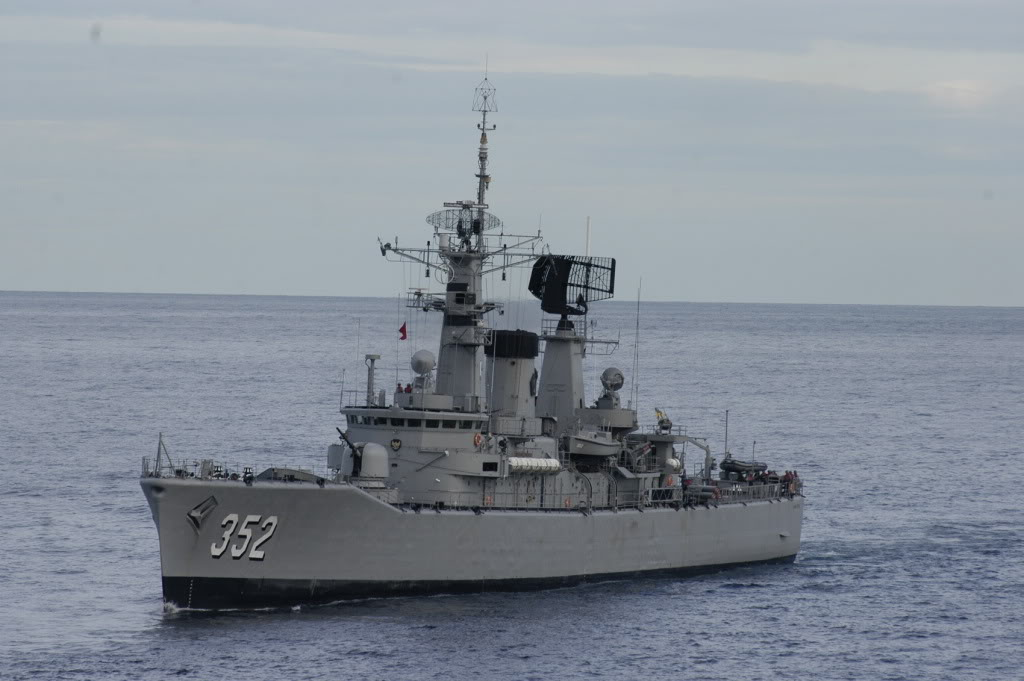
KRI Slamet Riyadi

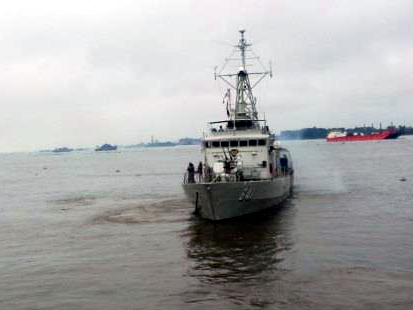
KRI Badau

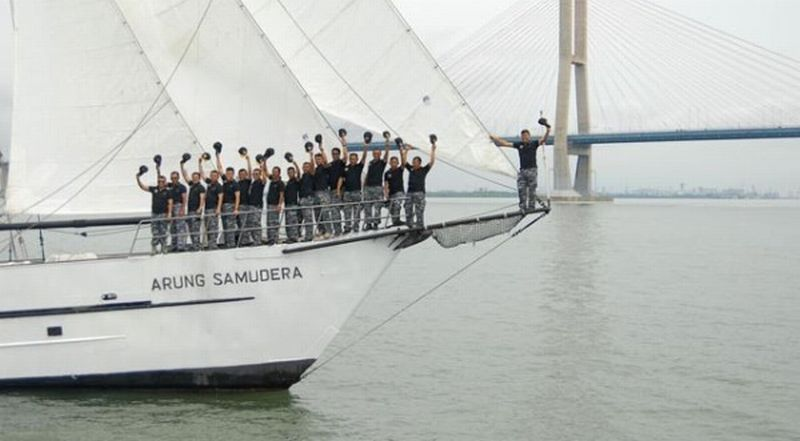
KRI Arung Samudera

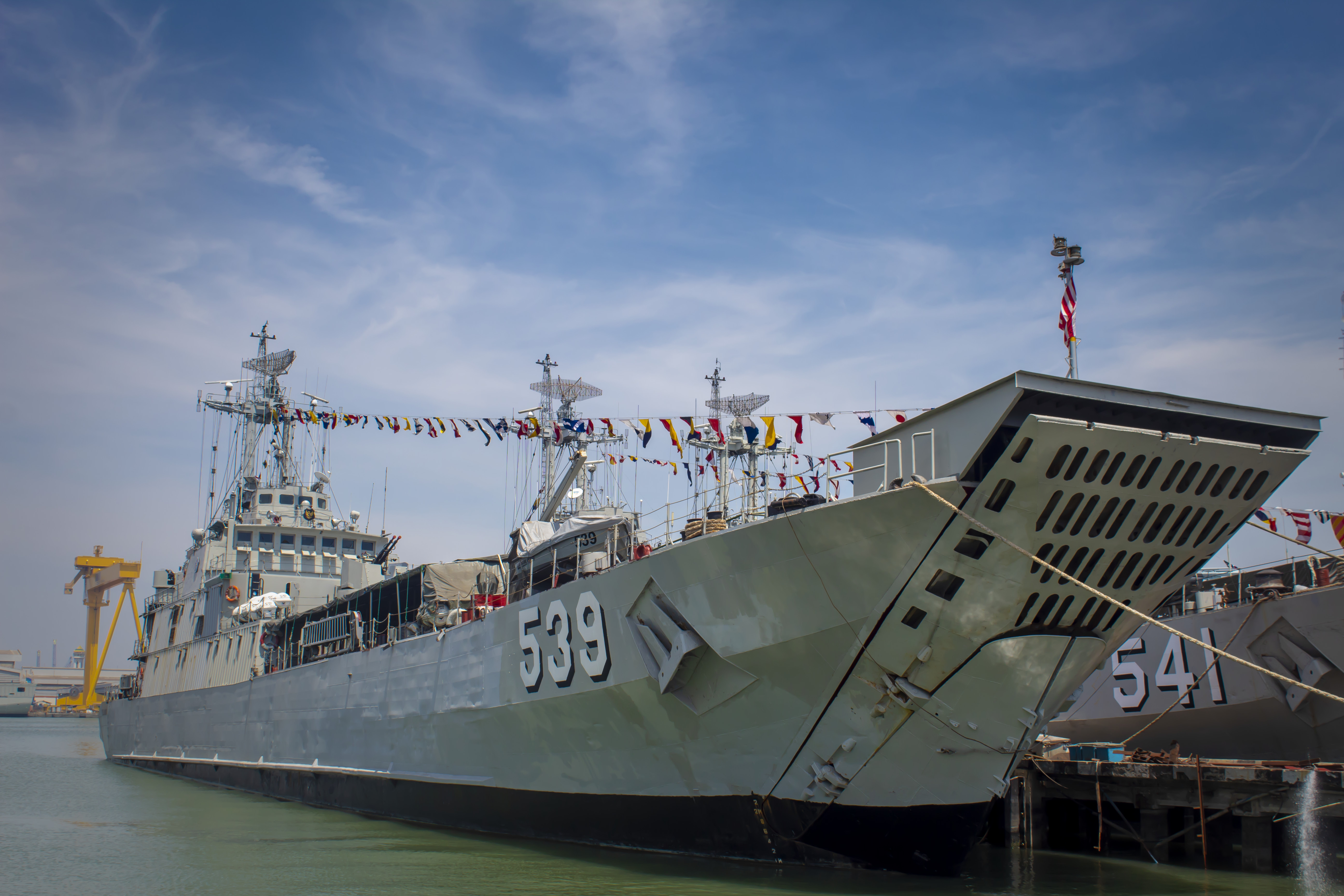
KRI Teluk Parigi

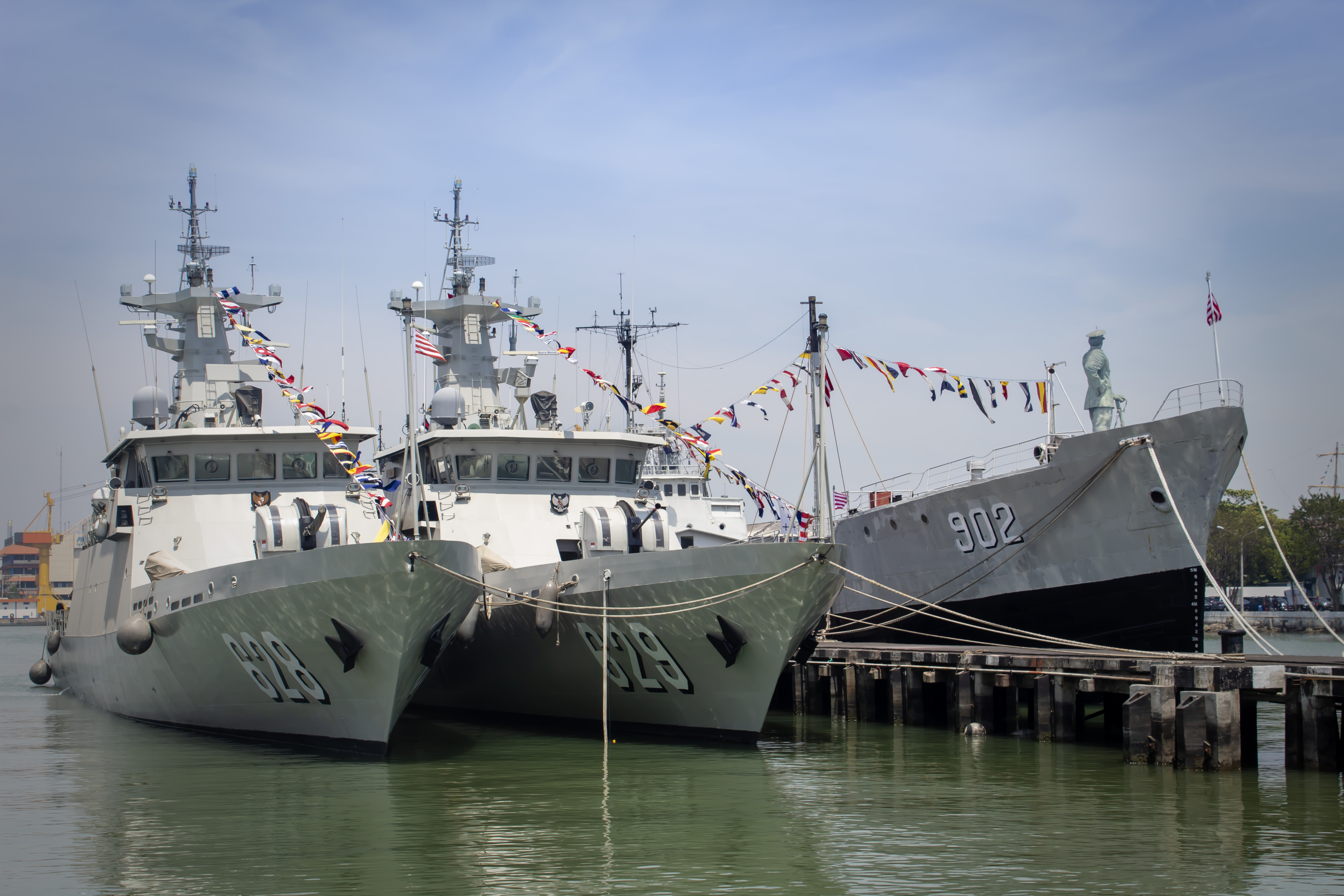
KRI Sampari & KRI Tombak & KRI Sambu

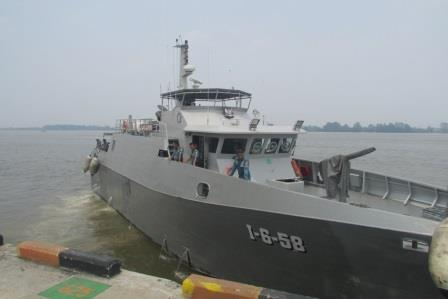
KAL Kumai

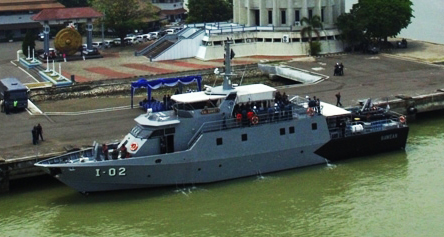
KAL Bawean

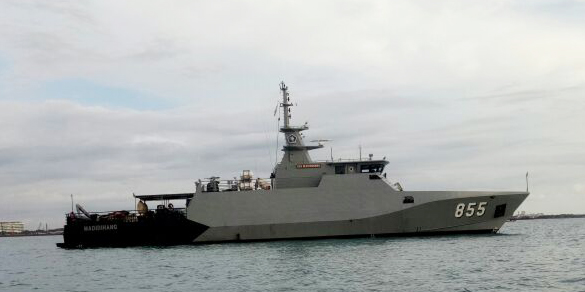
KRI Madidihang

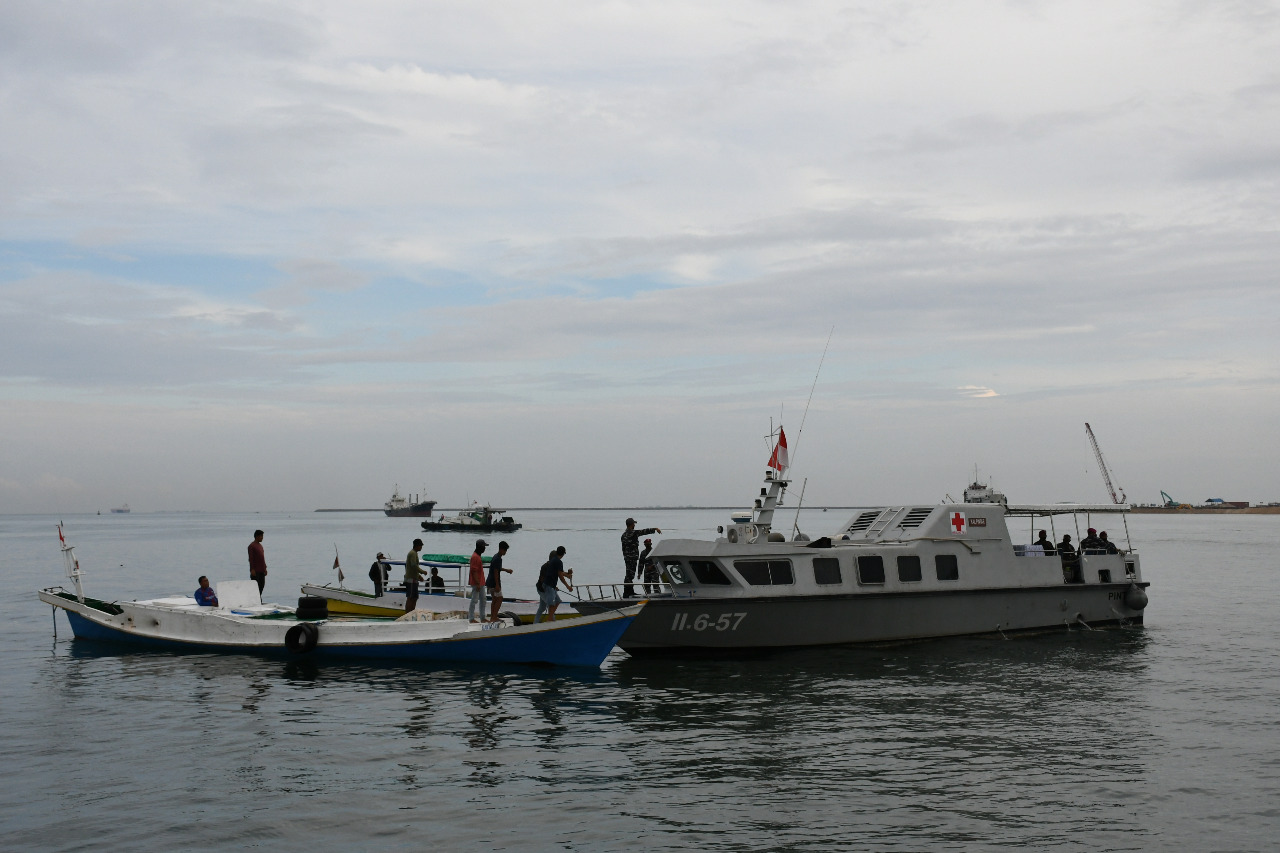
KAL Pintar

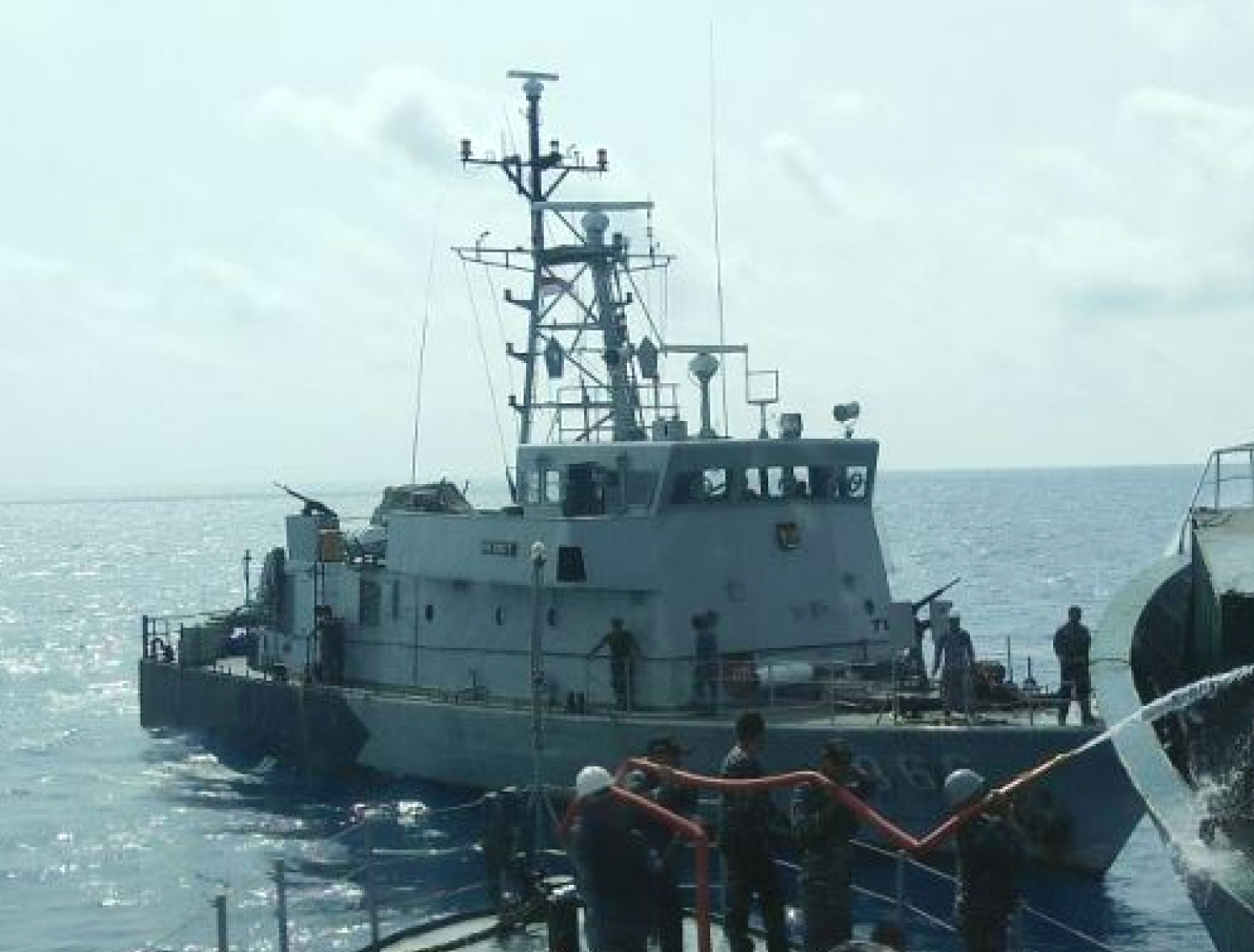
KRI Cucut

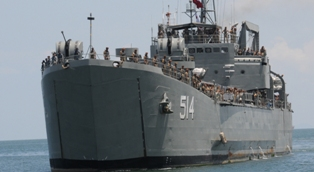
KRI Teluk Mandar

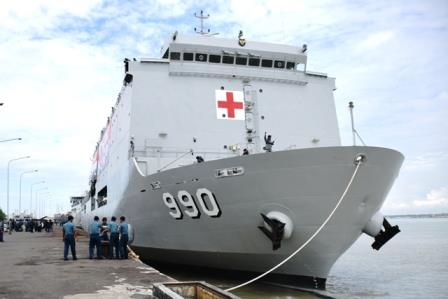
KRI dr. Soeharso

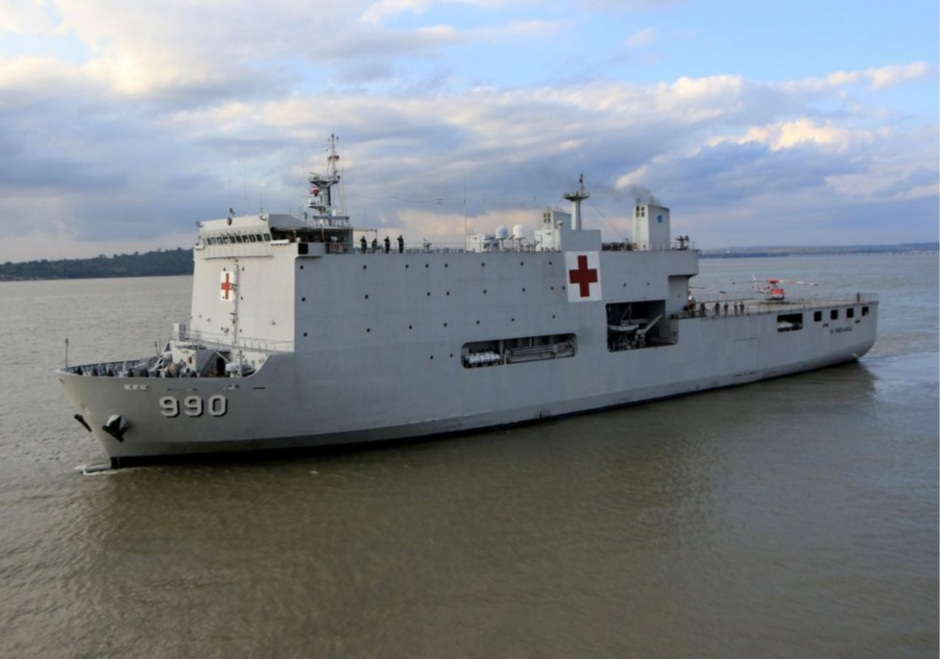
KRI dr. Soeharso

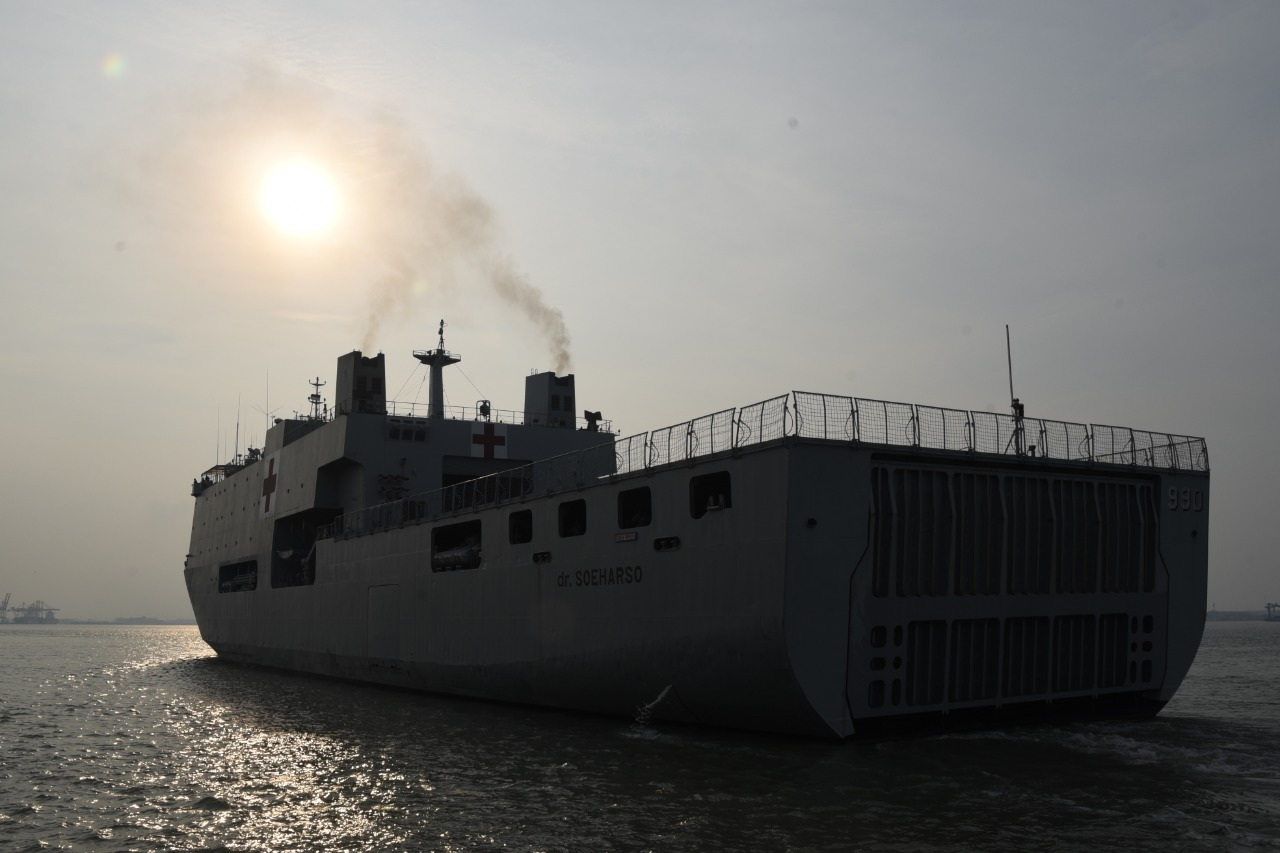
KRI dr. Soeharso

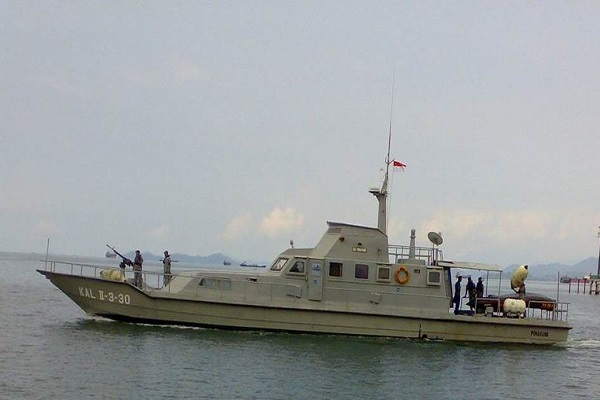
KAL Pohawang

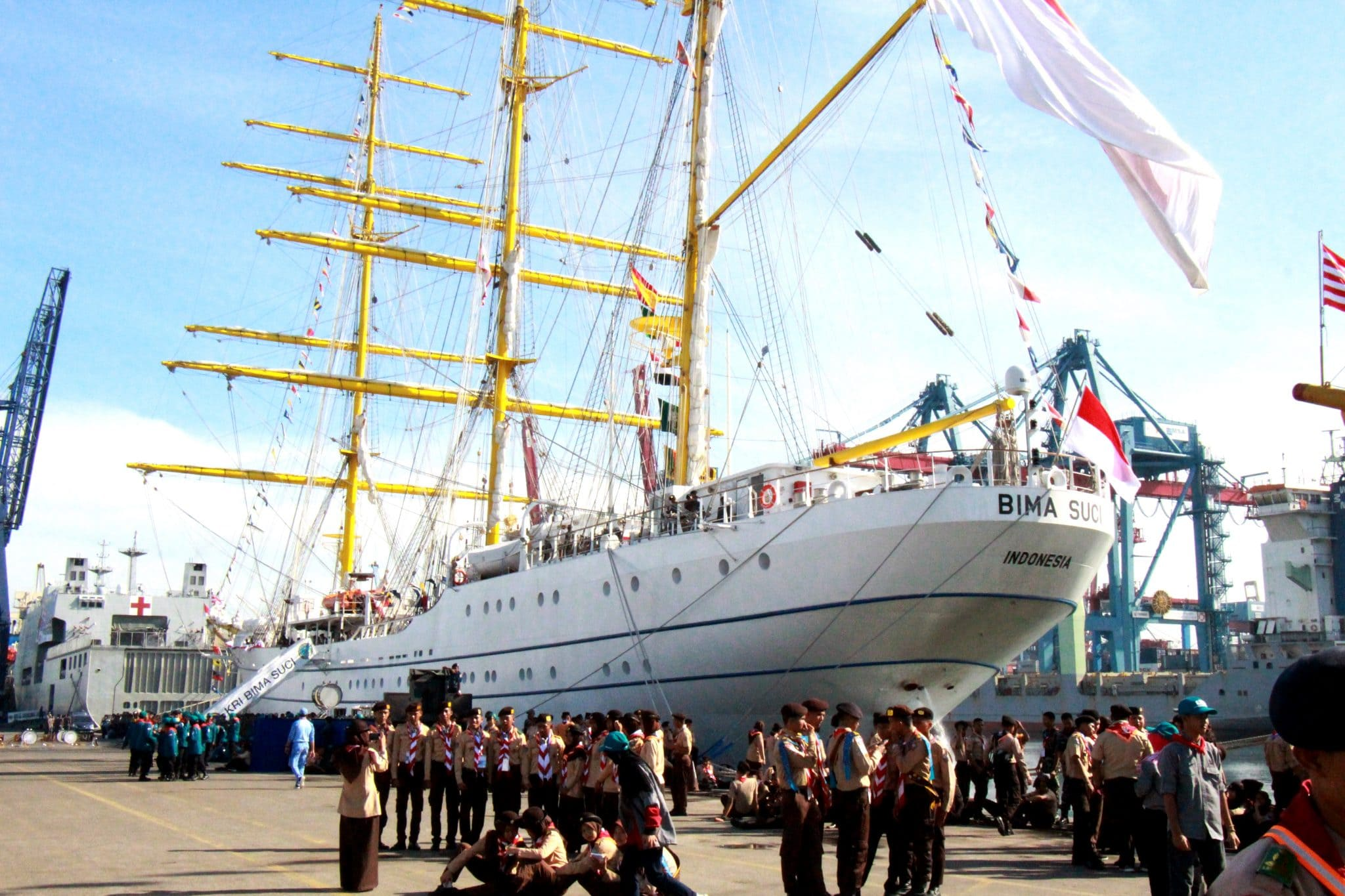
KRI Bima Suci

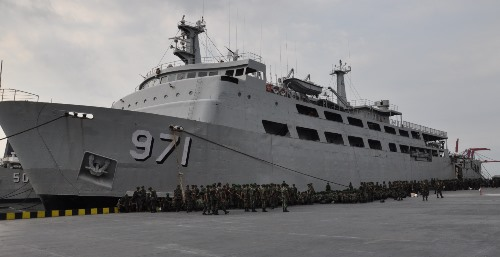
KRI Tanjung Kambani

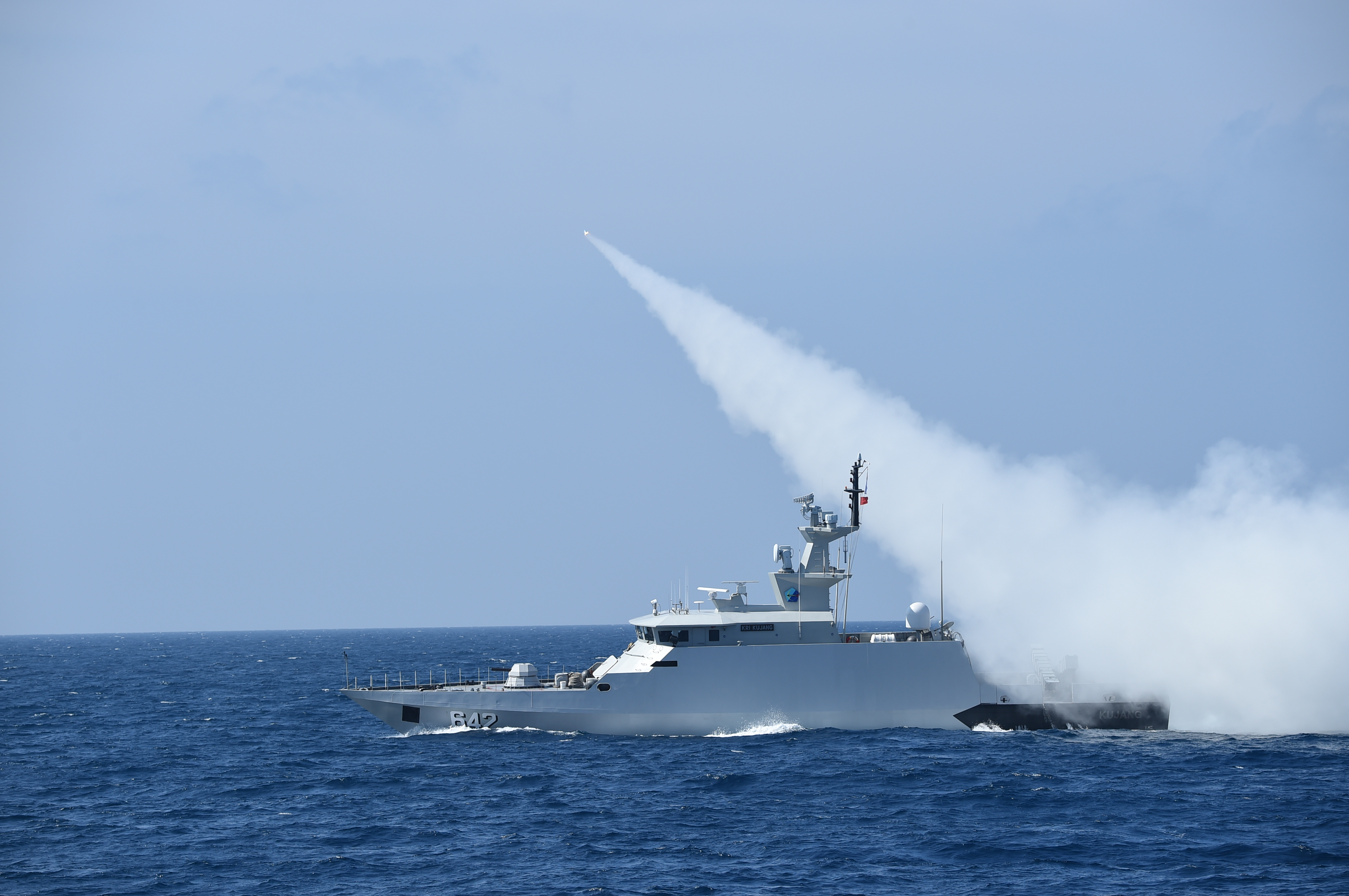
KRI Kujang

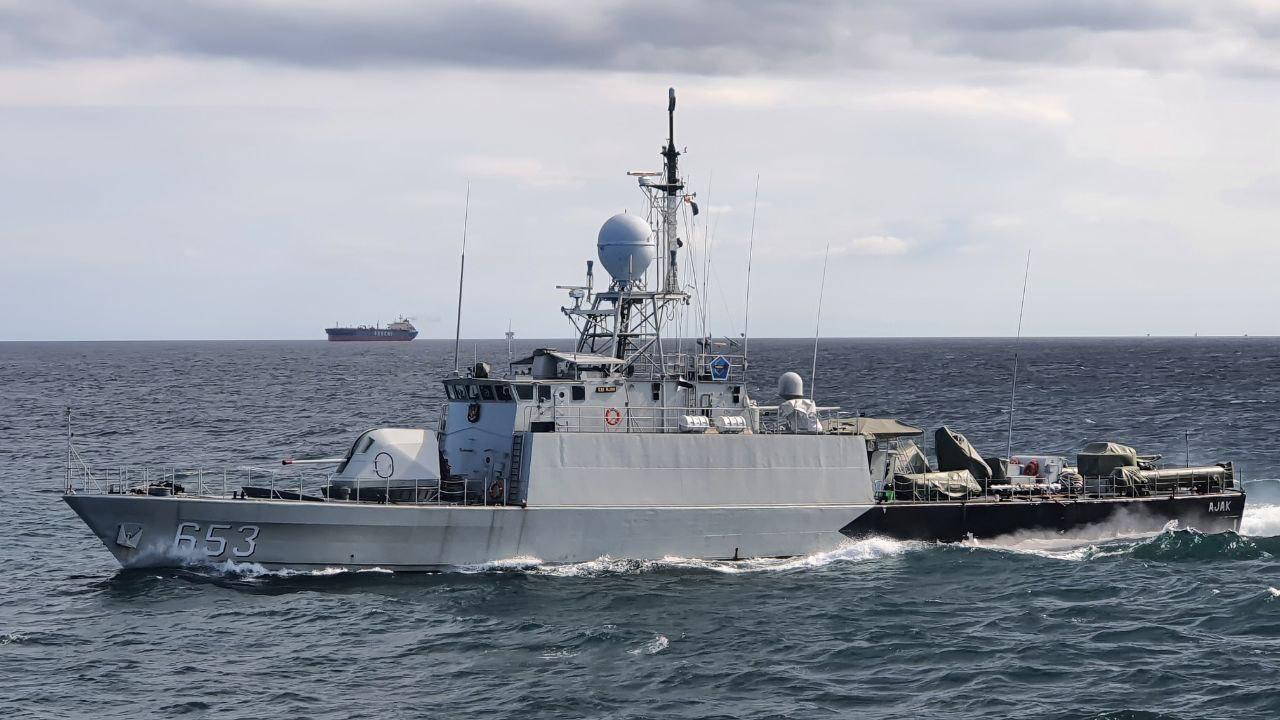
KRI Ajak

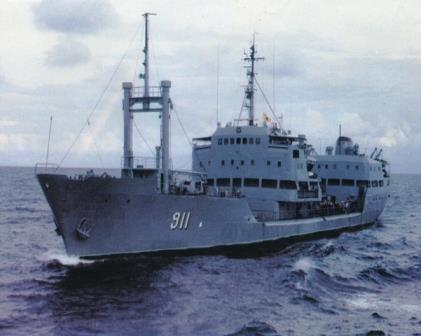
KRI Sorong

== Silhouettes ==
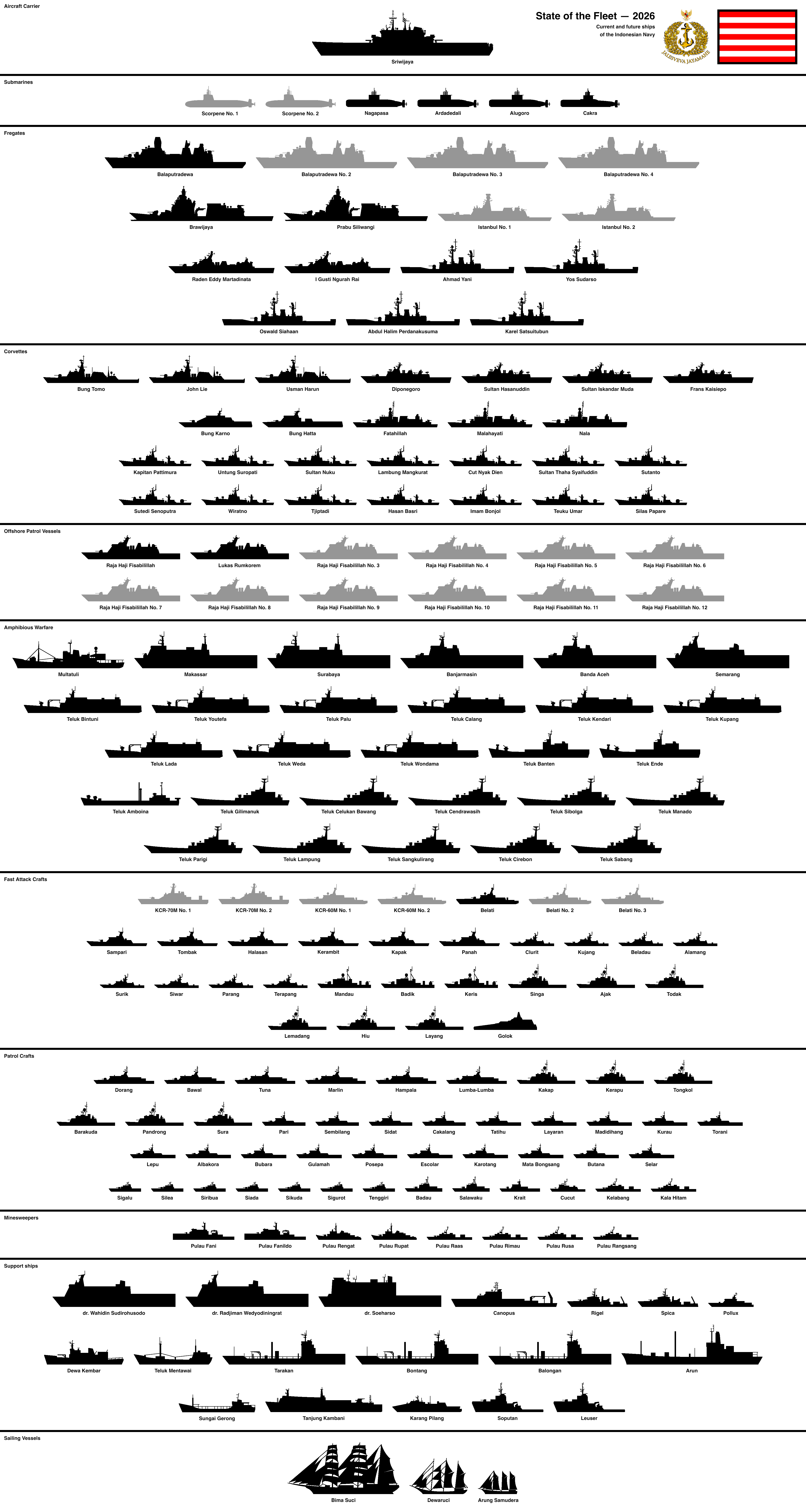

== See also ==
- Indonesian Maritime Security Agency
- List of equipment of the Indonesian Navy
- List of equipment of the Indonesian Air Force
- List of equipment of the Indonesian Army
- List of former ships of the Indonesian Navy

== Notes ==
BRN: British Royal Navy
USN: United States Navy
RNN: Royal Netherlands Navy
GDR: German Democratic Republic Navy (Volksmarine)
RFA: Royal Fleet Auxiliary
FPB: Fast Patrol Boat
LPD: Landing Platform Dock
LST: Landing Ship Tank
LCU: Landing Craft Utility
MPRV: Multi-Purpose Research Vessel
FAC-M: Fast Attack Craft - Missile
FAC-T: Fast Attack Craft - Torpedo
PB: Patrol Boat
RI: Short for Republik Indonesia, a common ship prefixes before being replaced with KRI
Fasharkan: Short for Fasilitas Pemeliharaan dan Perbaikan or Service and Repair Facility owned by the navy
