= BAP Pisco =

At least two ships of the Peruvian Navy have been named BAP Pisco:

- BAP Pisco (DT-142) was a Terrebonne Parish-class tank landing ship launched in 1953 as USS LST-1163 and renamed USS Waldo County in 1955. She was transferred to Peru in 1984 serving until being scrapped in 2012
- BAP Pisco (AMP-156) is a Makassar-class landing platform dock launched in 2017
