= KRI Lukas Rumkorem =

Indonesian offshore patrol vessel

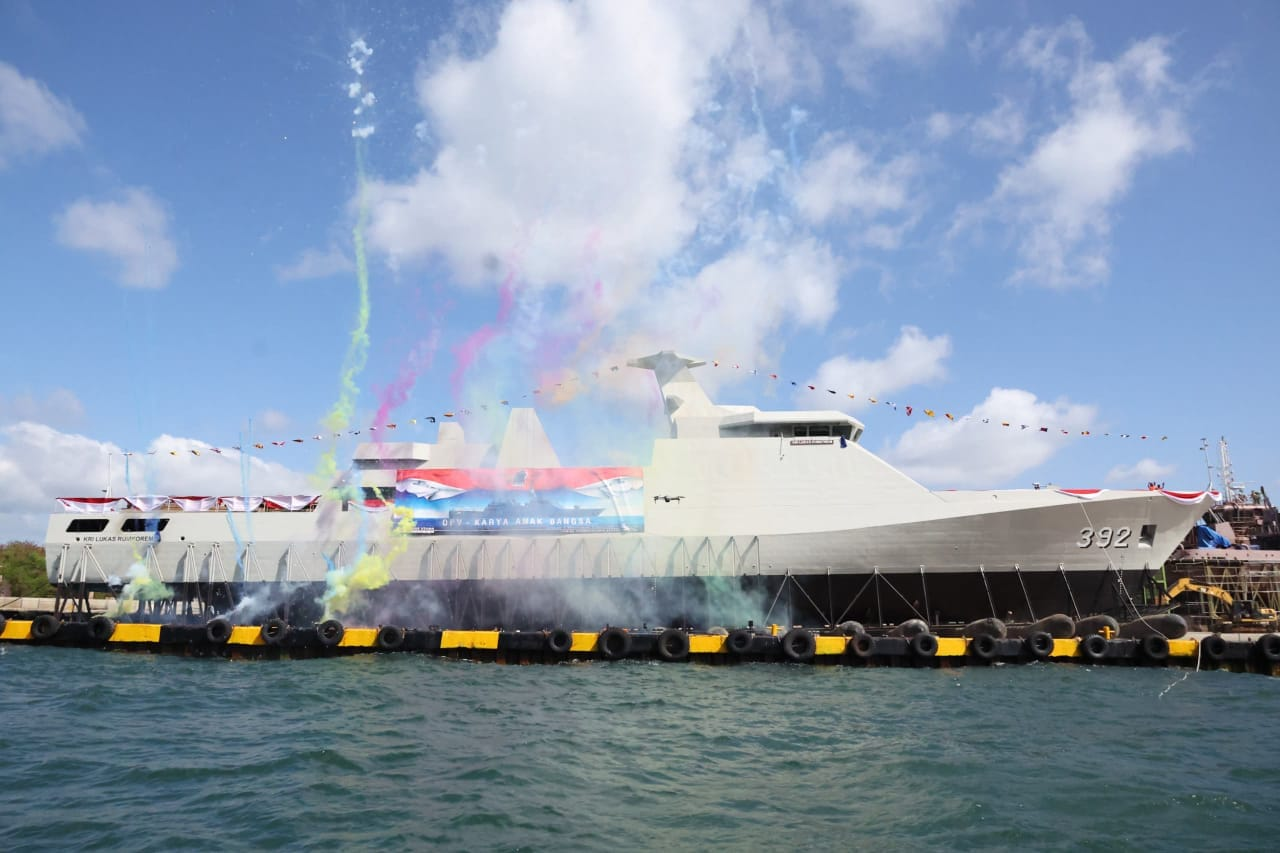
- KRI Lukas Rumkorem during its launching ceremony

History

Indonesia
- Name: KRI Lukas Rumkorem
- Namesake: Lukas Rumkorem
- Builder: Noahtu Shipyard, Bandar Lampung
- Cost: $70 millions/unit
- Yard number: 411
- Laid down: 16 November 2022
- Launched: 20 September 2024
- Identification: IMO number: 9923023; MMSI number: 525114131; Callsign: YDPP3; Pennant number: 392
- Status: Fitting out

General characteristics
- Type: Raja Haji Fisabilillah-class offshore patrol vessel
- Displacement: 1,800 t (1,800 long tons) (standard); 2,100 t (2,100 long tons) (full)
- Length: 98 m (321 ft 6 in)
- Beam: 13.5 m (44 ft) (breadth)
- Height: 6.5 m (21 ft)
- Draft: 4 m (13 ft)
- Propulsion: 4 × MAN 16V28/33STC diesel engines, 7,280 kW (9,760 shp)
- Speed: 28 knots (52 km/h)
- Boats & landing craft carried: 2 × RHIBs
- Complement: 70 (+24 extra personnel)
- Sensors & processing systems: Havelsan Advent CMS
- Electronic warfare & decoys: Elettronica Group RECM system; Terma A/S decoys
- Armament: Planned; 1 × OTO Melara 76 mm gun; 1 × OTO Twin 40L70 Compact gun; 2 × Escribano 20 mm guns; 2 × 4 missile launchers for Atmaca SSM; Torpedo launchers
- Aircraft carried: 1 × helicopter
- Aviation facilities: Flight deck and hangar

KRI Lukas Rumkorem (392) is the second ship of Raja Haji Fisabilillah-class offshore patrol vessel operated by the Indonesian Navy.

== Design ==
Unlike the class leader, Lukas Rumkorem initially was designed with a length of 60 m (200 ft), however during the construction it was redesigned to a length of 98 m (322 ft), the same as the class leader Raja Haji Fisabilillah.

== Service history ==
The ship's contract was awarded on 30 April 2020, with the contract worth Rp 1,085,090,000,000. Its construction began with first steel cutting on 26 August 2021 at the then PT Daya Radar Utama (later renamed to PT Noahtu Shipyard) shipyard in Bandar Lampung, Lampung.

The ship's keel was laid on 16 November 2022. The ship experienced delays during its construction, which drew some criticism. Although the ship was planned to be handed over in 2023, the construction progress was only at 35% by March 2023.

The patrol vessel was launched and officially given the name of Lukas Rumkorem on 20 September 2024.
