= KRI Raja Haji Fisabilillah =

Indonesian offshore patrol vessel

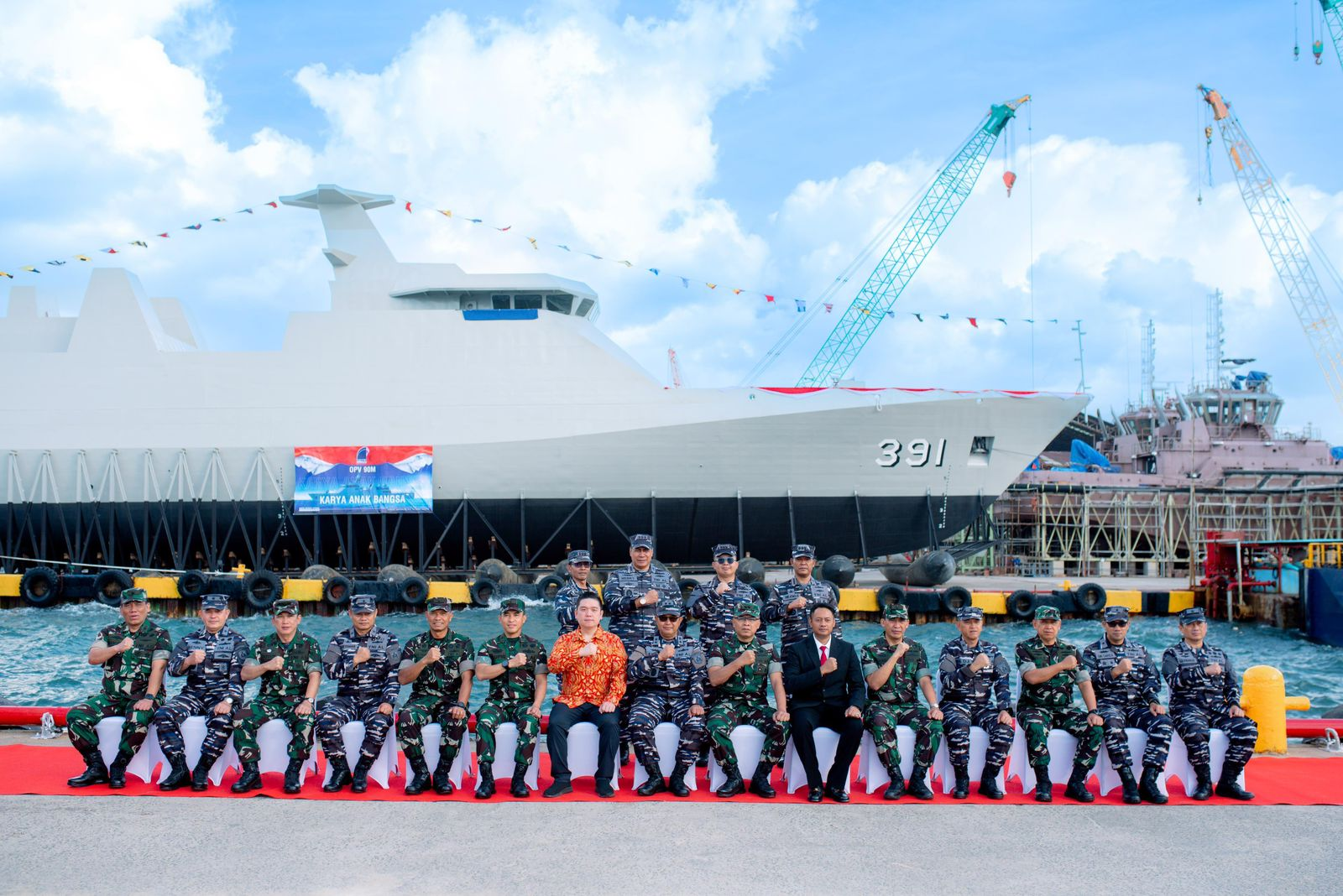
- Raja Haji Fisabilillah during its launching ceremony

History

Indonesia
- Name: KRI Raja Haji Fisabilillah
- Namesake: Raja Haji Fisabilillah
- Builder: Noahtu Shipyard, Bandar Lampung
- Cost: Rp 1.079 trillion
- Yard number: 406
- Laid down: 16 November 2022
- Launched: 18 September 2024
- Identification: IMO number: 9923011; MMSI number: 525114132; Callsign: YDPO3; Pennant number: 391
- Status: Sea trials

General characteristics
- Type: Raja Haji Fisabilillah-class offshore patrol vessel
- Displacement: 1,800 t (1,800 long tons) (standard); 2,100 t (2,100 long tons) (full)
- Length: 98 m (321 ft 6 in)
- Beam: 13.5 m (44 ft) (breadth)
- Height: 6.5 m (21 ft)
- Draft: 4 m (13 ft)
- Propulsion: 4 × MAN 16V28/33STC diesel engines, 7,280 kW (9,760 shp)
- Speed: 28 knots (52 km/h)
- Boats & landing craft carried: 2 × RHIBs
- Complement: 70 (+24 extra personnel)
- Sensors & processing systems: Havelsan Advent CMS
- Electronic warfare & decoys: Elettronica Group RECM system; Terma A/S decoys; Reutech RTS-3200 Fire Director Radar
- Armament: Planned; 1 × OTO Melara 76 mm gun; 1 × OTO Twin 40L70 Compact gun; 2 × Escribano 20 mm guns; 2 × 4 missile launchers for Atmaca SSM; Torpedo launchers
- Aircraft carried: 1 × helicopter
- Aviation facilities: Flight deck and hangar

KRI Raja Haji Fisabilillah (391) is the lead ship of Raja Haji Fisabilillah-class offshore patrol vessel to be operated by the Indonesian Navy.

== Design ==
Raja Haji Fisabilillah initially was designed with a length of 90 m (300 ft) and a beam of 13.5 m (44 ft), however during the construction it was redesigned to a length of 98 m (322 ft).

== Service history ==
The ship's contract was awarded on 16 April 2020, with the contract worth Rp 1,079,100,000,000. Its construction began with first steel cutting on 26 August 2021 at the then PT Daya Radar Utama (later renamed to PT Noahtu Shipyard) shipyard in Bandar Lampung, Lampung.

The ship's keel was laid on 16 November 2022. The ship experienced delays during its construction, which drew some criticism. Although the ship was planned to be handed over in 2023, the construction progress was only at 35% by March 2023.

The patrol vessel was launched on 18 September 2024, and was officially given the name of Raja Haji Fisabilillah two days later on the 20 September. The ship started sea trials in October 2025.
