= Raja Haji Fisabilillah-class patrol vessel =

Ship class of Indonesian Navy

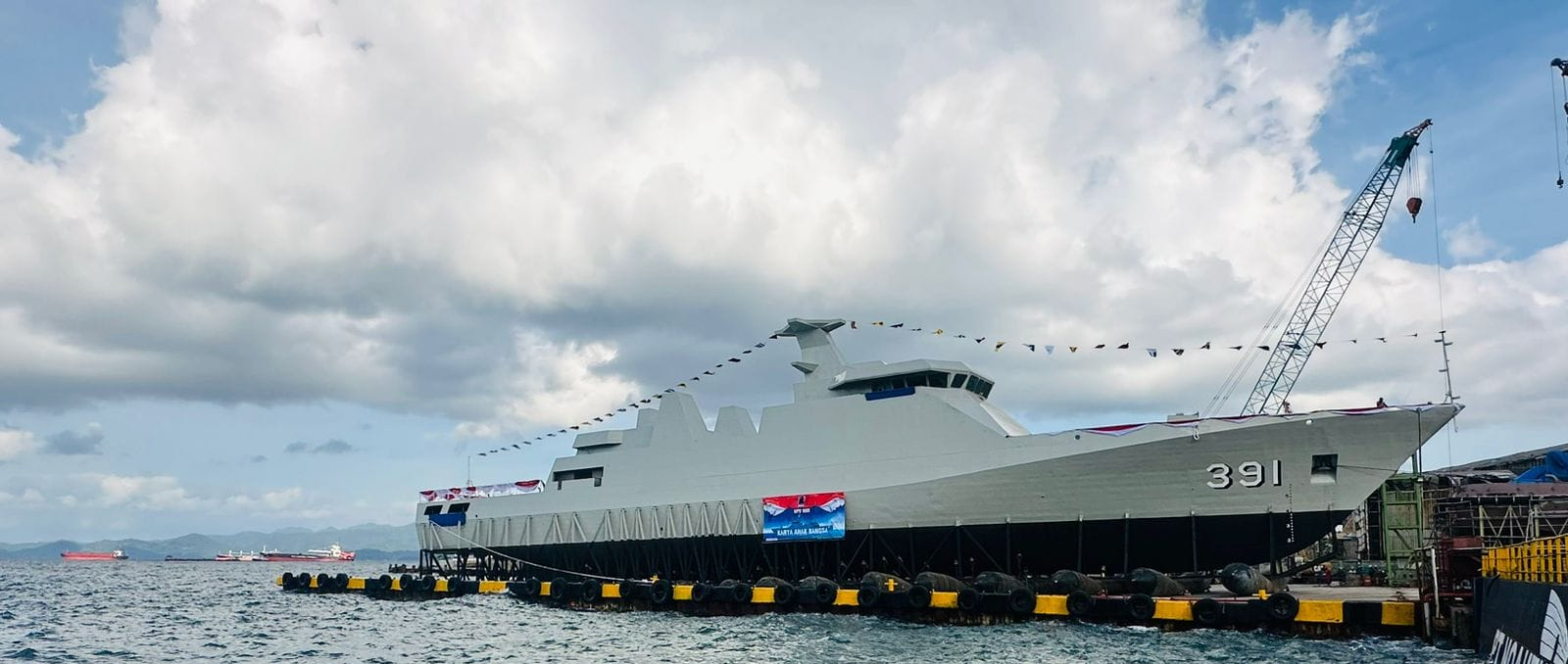
- KRI Raja Haji Fisabilillah during its launching ceremony on 18 September 2024

Class overview
- Name: Raja Haji Fisabilillah class
- Builders: PT Noahtu Shipyard, Bandar Lampung; PT Noahtu Shipyard, Batam
- Operators: Indonesian Navy
- Preceded by: Bung Tomo class
- Cost: $70 million/unit
- Built: 2021–present
- Planned: 12
- Building: 1
- Completed: 2

General characteristics
- Class & type: Offshore patrol vessel
- Displacement: 1,800 t (1,800 long tons) (standard); 2,100 t (2,100 long tons) (full)
- Length: 98 m (321 ft 6 in)
- Beam: 13.5 m (44 ft) (breadth)
- Height: 6.5 m (21 ft)
- Draft: 4 m (13 ft)
- Propulsion: 4 × MAN 16V28/33STC diesel engines, 7,280 kW (9,760 shp)
- Speed: 28 knots (52 km/h)
- Boats & landing craft carried: 2 × RHIBs
- Complement: 70 (+24 extra personnel)
- Sensors & processing systems: Havelsan Genesis Advent Combat Management Systems (CMS); Hensoldt TRS-4D Naval Multi-function Surveillance Target Acquisition Radar; 2 x Reutech RTS-3200 FMCW Optronics Radar Tracking Systems (FORT); Raytheon Anschutz NautoScan NX Navigation Radar; Towed Array Sonar Systems (TASS)
- Electronic warfare & decoys: Elettronica Group ZEUS RECM system; 2 x Terma A/S C-GUARD DL-12T 130 mm 12-tube decoy launcher
- Armament: Planned; 1 × OTO Melara 76 mm Naval Gun; 1 × OTO Twin 40L70 Compact Gun; 2 × Escribano SENTINEL 20 20 mm Gun; 2 × 4 missile launchers for Atmaca SSM; Torpedo launchers
- Aircraft carried: 1 × helicopter
- Aviation facilities: Flight deck and hangar

The Raja Haji Fisabilillah class, also known as OPV 90M, is a class of Indonesian offshore patrol vessels. The class are built by PT Noahtu Shipyard (formerly known as PT Daya Radar Utama). The Indonesian Navy has ordered three ships of the class.

According to the Indonesian Navy and the Indonesian Ministry of Defense, the combat capability of the ships are equal to light frigates.

== Design and description ==
Ships of the class initially were designed with a length of 90 m (300 ft) and a beam of 13.5 m (44 ft) for the first ship, and a length of 60 m (200 ft) for the second ship. However, during the construction both of them were redesigned to a length of 98 m (322 ft) and a beam of 13.5 m (44 ft). The ships has a draft of 4 m (13 ft) and height of 6.5 m (21 ft). The class has a standard displacement of 1,800 tonnes and full displacement of 2,100 tonnes. The ships will be powered by four MAN 16V28/33STC diesel engines generating 7,280 kW (9,760 shp), with planned top speed of 28 knots (52 km/h), cruising speed of 20 knots (37 km/h), and economical speed of 15 knots (28 km/h). The class has a complement of 70 crew members with provision for 24 extra personnel.

Based on a video released by the shipyard in 2019, the ships will be armed with one OTO Melara 76 mm, one 35 mm Rheinmetall Oerlikon Millennium Gun and two quadruple launchers for unspecified guided-missiles. In November 2022, the Indonesian government signed a contract for Atmaca missiles to be fitted to the ships. The class also able to carry a helicopter with flight deck and hangar facility.

After the launching of both ships, the Indonesian Navy revealed that both OPVs would be armed with Leonardo's 76 mm and 40 mm guns, 20 mm Oerlikon KAA guns in Escribano's SENTINEL 20 RCWS mount, Roketsan's Atmaca missiles in two quad missile launchers, and torpedo launchers.

The planned sensors and electronic systems of the ships consisted of HAVELSAN Advent combat management system (CMS), Elettronica Group radar electronic counter-measures system and Terma A/S decoys.

The class also carried two rigid-hulled inflatable boats for visit, board, search, and seizure purpose, with the launch loading ramps for the boats located at the stern.

== History ==
The contract for the first ship was awarded on 16 April 2020, with the contract worth Rp 1,079,100,000,000. The contract of the second ship was awarded on 30 April 2020, which worth Rp 1,085,090,000,000. The construction of both ships began with first steel cutting on 26 August 2021 at the then PT Daya Radar Utama (later renamed to PT Noahtu Shipyard) shipyard in Bandar Lampung, Lampung.

The keel laying for both ships was done on 16 November 2022. Both of the ships experienced delays during their construction, which drew some criticism. Although the ships were planned to be handed over in 2023, the construction progress was only at 35% by March 2023. The delays were probably caused by the ships' design revisions that happened during their construction.

The lead ship of the class, Raja Haji Fisabilillah, was launched on 18 September 2024. The second ship, Lukas Rumkorem, followed two days later on the 20 September. The Navy planned to assigned both ships into the Third Fleet Command in eastern Indonesia.

During an interview at Indo Defence 2024 held in mid-June 2025, the Director of Noahtu and Batamec shipyards, Adi Susanto, stated that a third ship was under construction at Noahtu Shipyard in Batam, Riau Islands. The first steel cut for the third ship was held on 7 May 2025. He also said that the Indonesian Navy planned to order up to 12 ships of the class.

Keel of the third OPV was laid down in Batam on 19 November 2025. The vessel is planned to be completed on 10 August 2028.

== Ships in the class ==
| Name | Namesake | Hull no. | Builder | Laid down | Launched | Commissioned | Status |
|---|---|---|---|---|---|---|---|
| Raja Haji Fisabilillah | Raja Haji Fisabilillah, 4th Yang di-Pertuan Muda of Riau, killed in action against the Dutch at Teluk Ketapang. | 391 | PT Noahtu Shipyard, Bandar Lampung | 16 November 2022 | 18 September 2024 | | Sea trials |
| Lukas Rumkorem | Lukas Rumkorem, a Papuan titular major in the Indonesian Navy | 392 | PT Noahtu Shipyard, Bandar Lampung | 16 November 2022 | 20 September 2024 | | Sea trials |
| TBA | | 393 | PT Noahtu Shipyard, Batam | 19 November 2025 | | | Under construction |

== See also ==
- List of active Indonesian Navy ships
