= KRI Banjarmasin =

Makassar-class landing platform dock

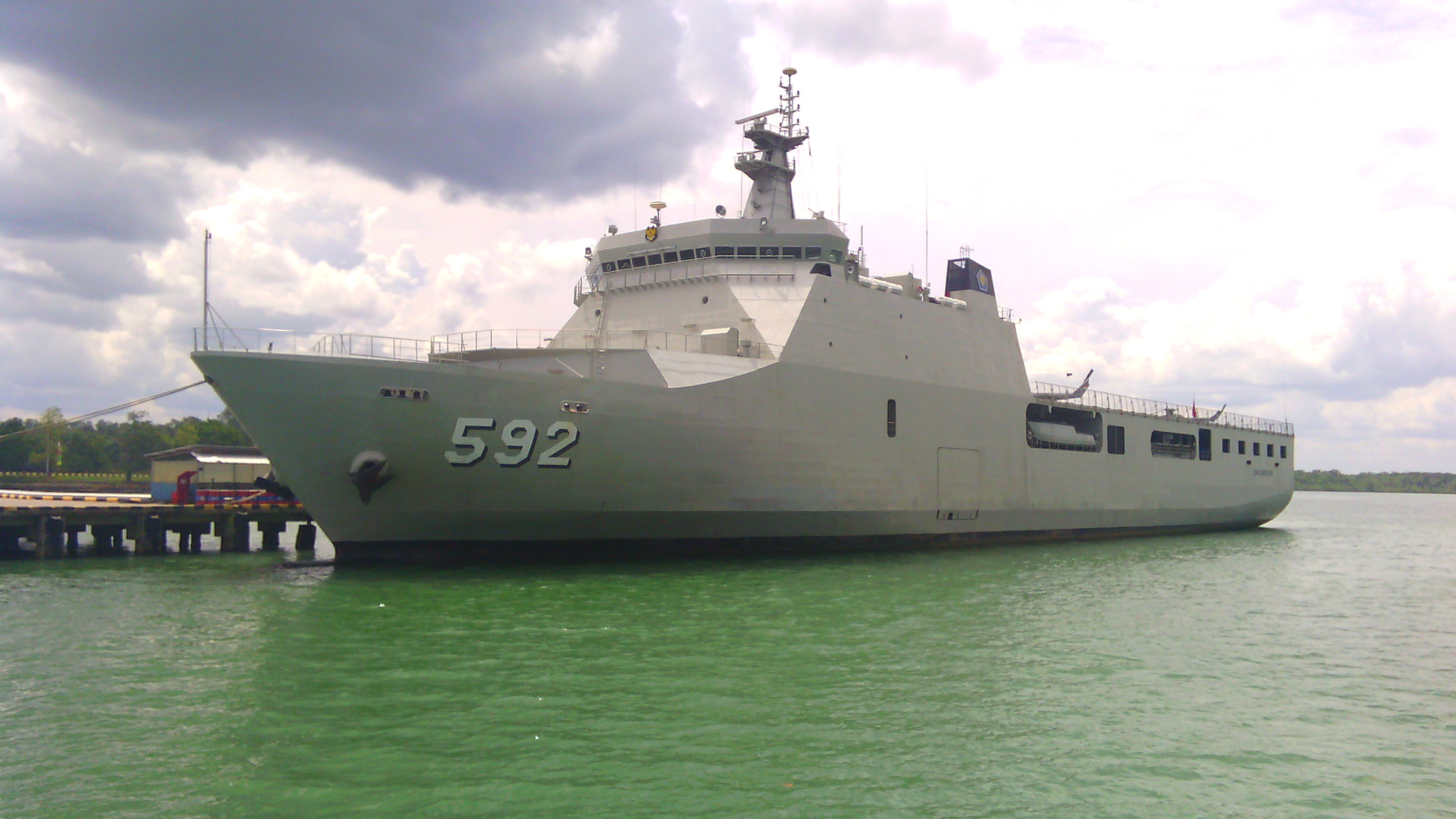
- KRI Banjarmasin on 17 December 2014

History

Indonesia
- Name: Banjarmasin
- Namesake: Banjarmasin
- Ordered: 28 March 2005
- Builder: PT PAL, Surabaya
- Laid down: 19 October 2006
- Launched: 28 August 2008
- Commissioned: 28 November 2009
- Identification: Pennant number: 592
- Motto: Amun Mundur Kada; (Never Give Up)
- Status: Active

General characteristics
- Class & type: Makassar-class landing platform dock
- Tonnage: 12,400 tons
- Displacement: 11,300 tons standard displacement; 15,994 tons full displacement
- Length: 122 meters
- Beam: 22 meters
- Height: 56 meters
- Draft: 4.9 meters
- Decks: (Tank Deck); 6.7 meter, (Truck Deck); 11.3 meter
- Propulsion: CODAD, 2 shafts; 2 × MAN B&W 8L28/32A diesel rated at 2666 BHP/1960 kW@ 775 RPM
- Speed: Maximum: 16 knots; Cruising: 14 knots; Economy: 12 knots
- Range: 30 days, up to 10,000 Nm
- Endurance: +45 days
- Boats & landing craft carried: 2 x LCVPs
- Capacity: up to 20 armoured fighting vehicles, 3 howitzers
- Troops: 344 troops
- Complement: accommodations up to 507 persons
- Crew: 126 crew
- Armament: 1 x Bofors 40mm SAK40/L70 2 x 20mm Oerlikon 2 x Mistral Simbad
- Aircraft carried: 5 x Bell 412 or Mil Mi-2 helicopters
- Aviation facilities: 2 helideck spot (Medium-sized helicopters)

KRI Banjarmasin (592) is the third ship of the Makassar-class landing platform dock of the Indonesian Navy.

== Development and design ==
Indonesia signed a US$150 million contract in December 2004 and the first two units were built in Busan, South Korea. The remaining two were built at Indonesia's PT PAL shipyard in Surabaya with assistance from Daesun.The contract for the 3rd and 4th LPD to be built in Indonesia was signed with PT PAL on March 28, 2005.

On 19 October 2006, the first of the two Indonesian-built units, was laid down in a ceremony by Admiral Slamet Subiyanto, Chief of Staff, Indonesian Navy. The 3rd and 4th units had been designed to function as flagships with provisions for a command and control system, 57mm gun and air defence systems.

The 5th ship ordered by Indonesian navy on January 11, 2017. First steel cutting ceremony for said ship was conducted on April 28, 2017. The ship's keel was laid on August 28. 2017.

== Construction and career ==
Banjarmasin was laid down 19 October 2006 and launched on 28 August 2008 by PT PAL at Surabaya. She was commissioned on 28 November 2009.

== Gallery ==
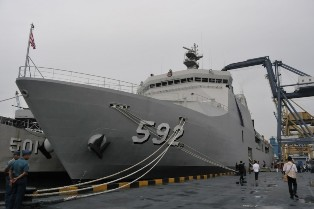
KRI Banjarmasin on 11 July 2011.

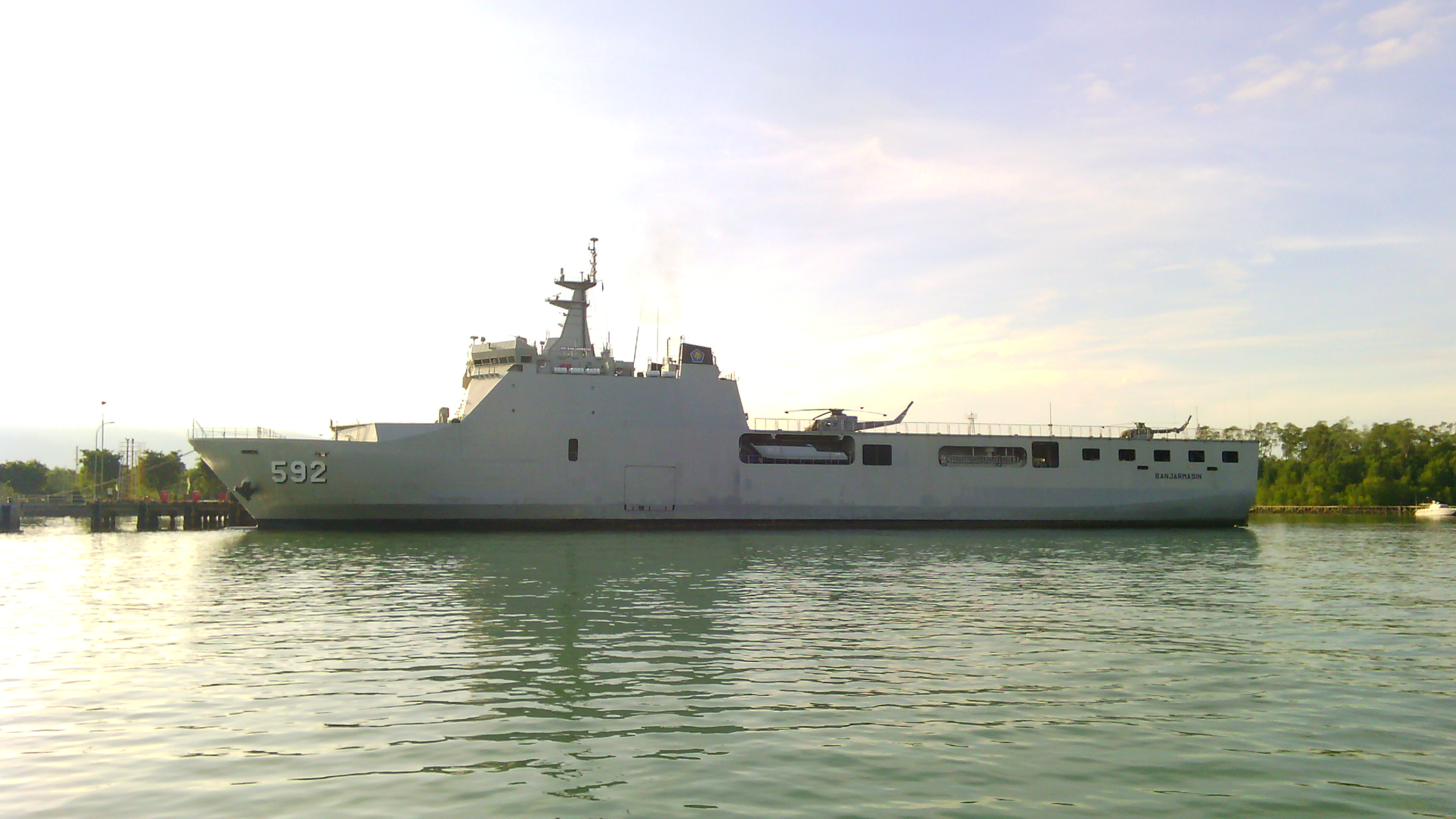
KRI Banjarmasin on 17 December 2014.
