= KRI Bung Tomo =

Bung Tomo-class corvette of Indonesian Navy

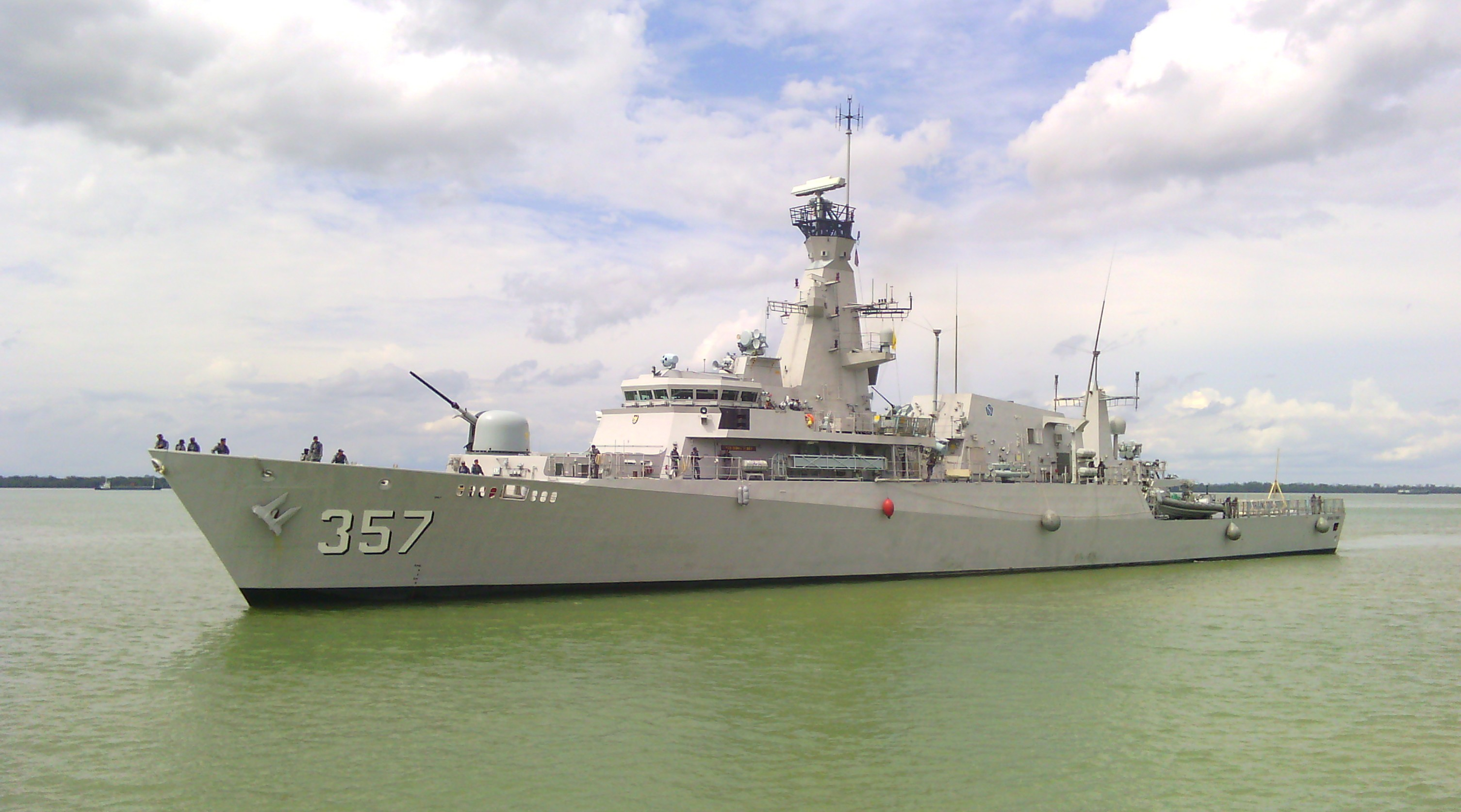
- KRI Bung Tomo on 12 December 2014

History

Brunei
- Name: Jerambak
- Namesake: Awang Jerambak
- Builder: BAE Systems Marine, Scotstoun, Scotland
- Launched: 22 June 2002
- Identification: Pennant number: 30
- Fate: Sold to Indonesian Navy in 2014

Indonesia
- Name: Bung Tomo
- Namesake: Sutomo
- Commissioned: 11 July 2014
- Identification: MMSI number: 525014074; Callsign: PLJT; Pennant number: 357
- Status: In active service

General characteristics
- Class & type: Bung Tomo-class corvette
- Displacement: 1,940 tons
- Length: 89.9 m (294 ft 11 in)
- Height: 3.6 m (11 ft 10 in)
- Installed power: 11,400 hp (8,500 kW)
- Propulsion: 4 x MAN B&W / Ruston Diesel engines 2 x shafts
- Speed: 30 knots (56 km/h; 35 mph) maximum
- Range: 5,000 nmi (9,300 km; 5,800 mi)
- Endurance: 21 days
- Boats & landing craft carried: 2 x patrol craft
- Complement: 103
- Sensors & processing systems: Ultra Electronics / Radamec Series 2500 electro-optic weapons director; Thales Underwater Systems TMS 4130C1 hull-mounted sonar; BAE Systems Insyte AWS-9 3D E- and F-band air and surface radar; BAE Systems Insyte 1802SW I / J-band radar trackers; Kelvin Hughes Type 1007 navigation radar; Thales Nederland Scout radar for surface search; Thales Nederland Sensors Cutlass 242 countermeasure
- Armament: Guns : 1 x OTO Melara 76 mm gun; 2 x DS 30B REMSIG 30 mm guns; 16 Vertical launching system for MBDA (BAE Systems) Seawolf surface-to-air missile launcher (retired and planned to be replaced with VL MICA or Sea Ceptor); 2 x 4 MBDA (Aerospatiale) Exocet MM40 Block II/III missile launchers; 2 x triple BAE Systems Mark 32 Surface Vessel Torpedo Tubes
- Aircraft carried: 1 × helicopter
- Aviation facilities: Helicopter landing platform

KRI Bung Tomo (357) is a Bung Tomo-class corvette in service with the Indonesian Navy. She was originally built for the Royal Brunei Navy and launched as KDB Jerambak in 2002. Bung Tomo is the lead ship of her class.

== Namesake ==
Awang Jerambak was a warrior known to be an excellent war leader and the brother of Awang Alak Betatar, Sultan of Brunei.

== Class background ==
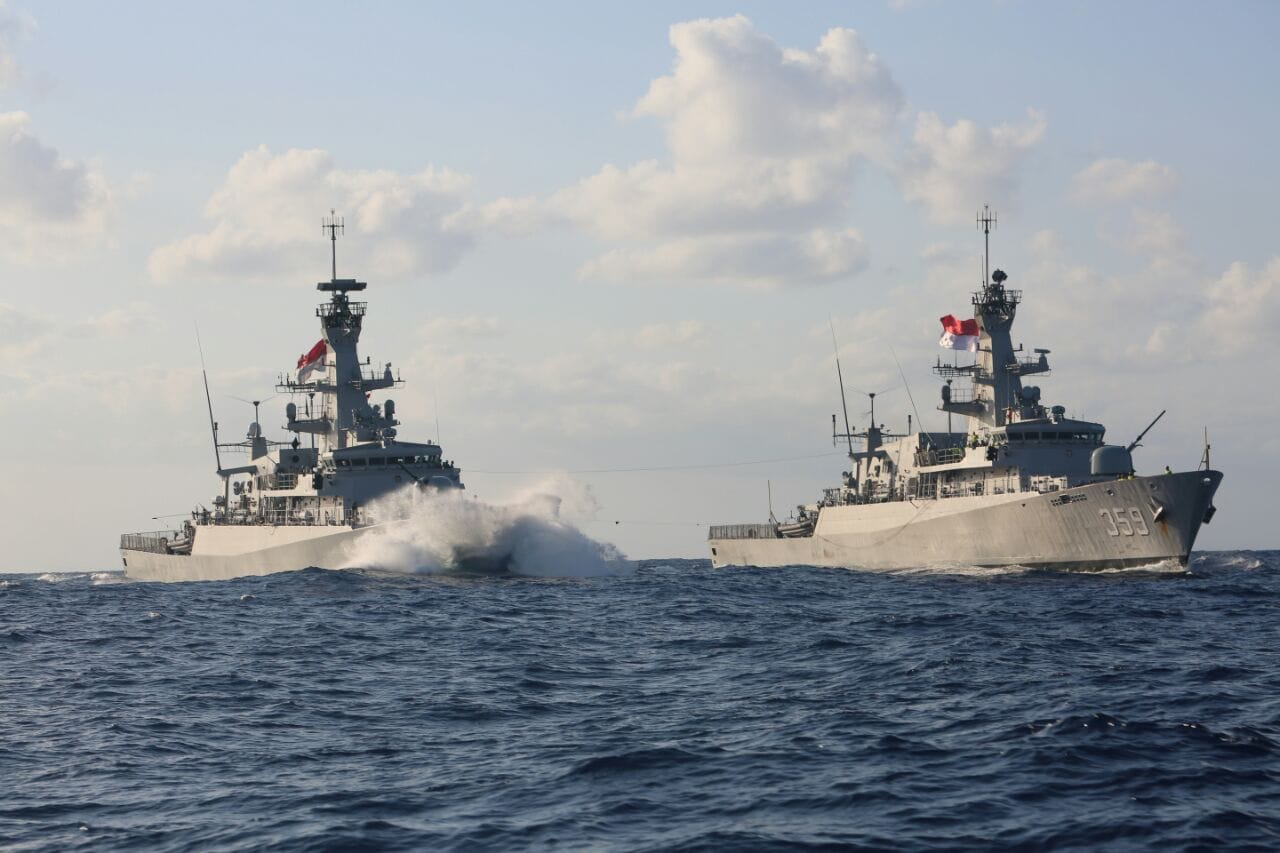
KRI Bung Tomo (357) and KRI Usman Harun (359)

The Bung Tomo-class corvettes are three vessels built by BAE Systems Marine (now BAE Systems Maritime – Naval Ships). The contract was awarded to GEC-Marconi in 1995 and the ships, a variant of the F2000 design, were launched in January 2001, June 2001 and June 2002 at the then BAE Systems Marine yard at Scotstoun, Glasgow. The customer refused to accept the vessels and the contract dispute became the subject of arbitration. When the dispute was settled in favour of BAE Systems, the vessels were handed over to Royal Brunei Technical Services in June 2007.

In 2007, Brunei contracted the German Lürssen shipyard to find a new customer for the three ships. In 2013, Indonesia bought the vessels for £380 million or half of the original unit cost.

The ships were originally armed with MBDA Exocet Block II anti-ship missiles and MBDA Seawolf air-defence missiles. The main gun is an OTO Melara 76 mm; the ship also carries two torpedo tubes, two 30 mm remote weapon stations and has a landing spot for a helicopter. As of 2018, the MBDA Seawolf missile was out of service there was plans to replace it with the VL Mica.

== Construction and career ==
KDB Jerambak was launched on 22 June 2002 and commissioned into the Indonesian Navy on 11 July 2014. She originally had the hull number 30 but were later changed to 357. She was never commissioned in the Royal Brunei Navy.

In December 2014 to January 2015, KRI Bung Tomo (357) along with numbers of other Indonesian Navy ships under the command center ship KRI Banda Aceh (593), involved in the search for the victims of the Indonesia AirAsia Flight 8501 accident. KRI Bung Tomo was the first ship to discover the wreckage of the Air Asia QZ8501.

On 12 July 2018, KRI Bung Tomo arrived in Kochi Port, India for a two-day visit. Bung Tomo and KRI I Gusti Ngurah Rai visited Muara Port, Brunei from 8 to 11 December 2018. Both ships conducted PASSEX with KDB Darulaman before departing for Jakarta, Indonesia.

On 31 January 2025, Bung Tomo arrived at the Port of Colombo, Sri Lanka, for an official visit under the command of Captain Dedi Gunawan Widyatmoko. The vessel departed the island on 1 February 2025 after concluding its visit. It returned to the Port of Colombo on 16 February and departed on 17 February 2025.

In February 2026, Bung Tomo participated in the International Fleet Review 2026 and Exercise MILAN held in Vishakhapatnam, India.
