= KRI Belati =

Fast missile craft of Indonesian Navy

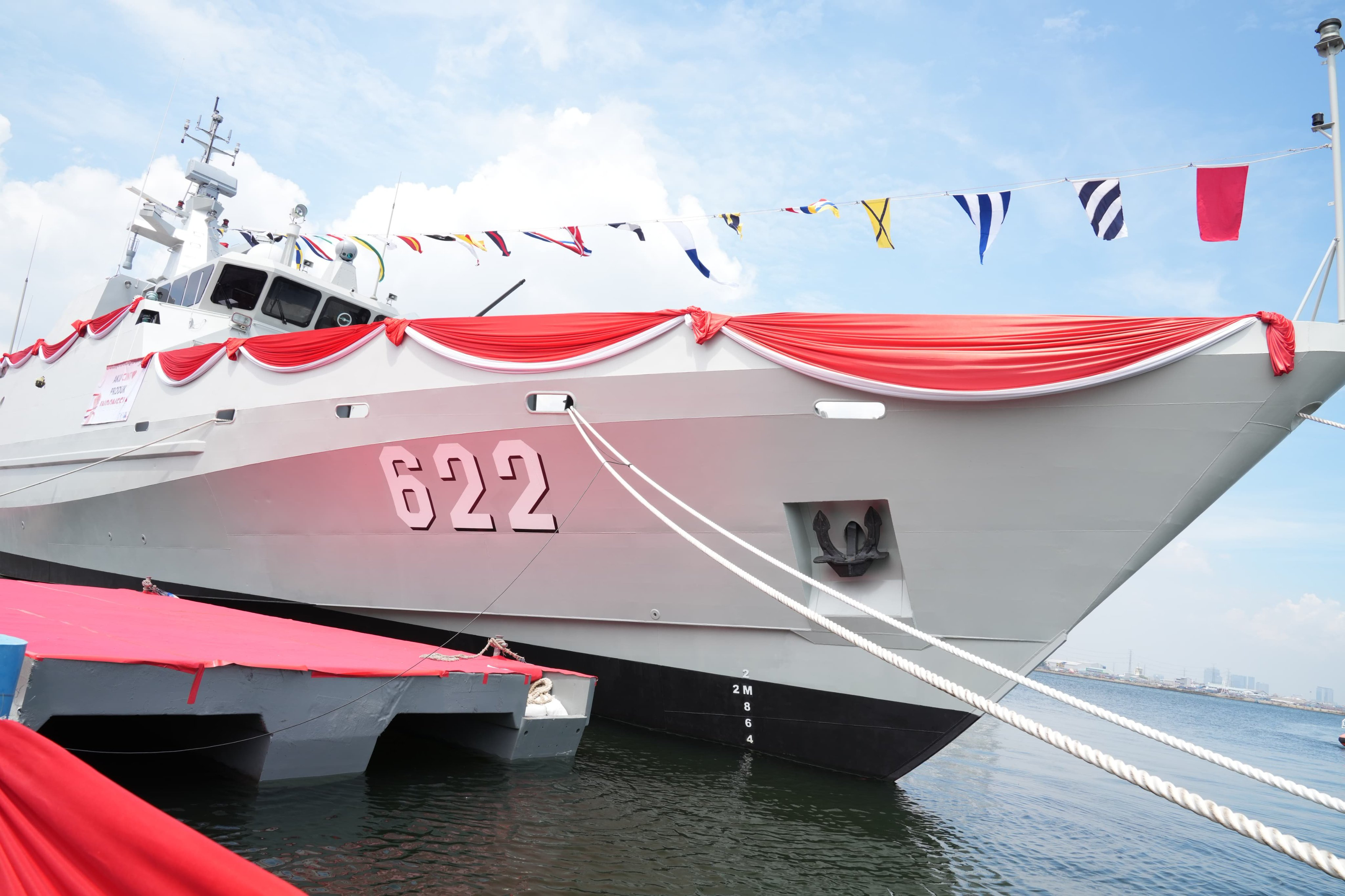
- KRI Belati during its naming ceremony

History

Indonesia
- Name: KRI Belati
- Namesake: Pisuwe (Papuan dagger)
- Ordered: 2021
- Builder: PT Tesco Indomaritim, Bekasi
- Cost: ~IDR 1 trillion
- Launched: 2022
- Commissioned: 24 October 2025
- Home port: Sorong
- Identification: Pennant number: 622
- Status: In active service

General characteristics
- Type: Fast attack craft
- Displacement: 500 tonnes (490 long tons)
- Length: 62 m (203 ft 5 in)
- Beam: 9 m (29 ft 6 in)
- Height: 5 m (16 ft)
- Propulsion: 2 × MTU 16V 4000 M93L diesel engines for single fixed propeller; 1 × MTU 16V 4000 M63L diesel engine for two Hamilton HT900 water jets
- Speed: 30 knots (56 km/h)
- Complement: 62
- Sensors & processing systems: Aselsan CENK 200-N surveillance radar; Leonardo MEDUSA MK4/B Electro-Optical (EO) Fire Control System (FCS); HAVELSAN Advent Combat Management System (CMS); HAVELSAN Fleetstar Data Distribution System; Sperry Marine VisionMaster FT X-Band Navigation Radar
- Electronic warfare & decoys: Teledyne PHOBOS R-ESM
- Armament: 1 × 40 mm Leonardo OTO Marlin 40 RC; 2 × 20 mm AEI System AE20-NM-2 autocannons; 2 × 2 missile launchers for Atmaca SSM

KRI Belati (622) is a guided-missile fast attack craft of the Indonesian Navy.

== Design and description ==
Belati has a length of 62 m (203 ft), beam of 9 m (30 ft), height of 5 m (16 ft), and displacement of 500 tonnes (490 long tons). The vessel is powered by one MTU 16V 4000 M63L diesel engine for its two Hamilton HT900 water jets and two MTU 16V 4000 M93L diesel engines linked to a single fixed-pitch propeller, with a top speed of 30 knots (56 km/h). During a live demo in early November 2022, Belati managed to reach the speed of 35 knots (65 km/h). Belati has a complement of 62 personnel.

The vessel is armed with one Leonardo's OTO Marlin 40 RC naval gun, two 20 mm AEI System AE20-NM-2 autocannons, and two twin launchers for Roketsan Atmaca surface-to-surface missiles.

The sensors and electronic systems of Belati consisted of Aselsan CENK 200-N X-band surveillance radar, HAVELSAN's Advent combat management system (CMS) and Fleetstar data distribution system.

== Construction and career ==
Ministry of Defense of Indonesia awarded around Rp 1 trillion contract for the construction of a 60 meters fast missile craft (Kapal Cepat Rudal 60M/KCR-60M) in 2021 to the PT Tesco Indomaritim, a private shipbuilder based in Babelan, Bekasi Regency, West Java. The vessel was publicly unveiled for the first time during the Indo Marine Expo & Forum 2022 at Pondok Dayung, North Jakarta in early November 2022. The vessel was built in 34 months.

The missile craft was officially named as KRI Belati on 1 October 2025. Belati was commissioned on 24 October at the Military Sealift Command headquarters in Tanjung Priok, Jakarta. The vessel is to be deployed to the Third Fleet Command in eastern Indonesia, with its homeport in Sorong, Southwest Papua.
