= KRI Banda Aceh =

Makassar-class landing platform dock

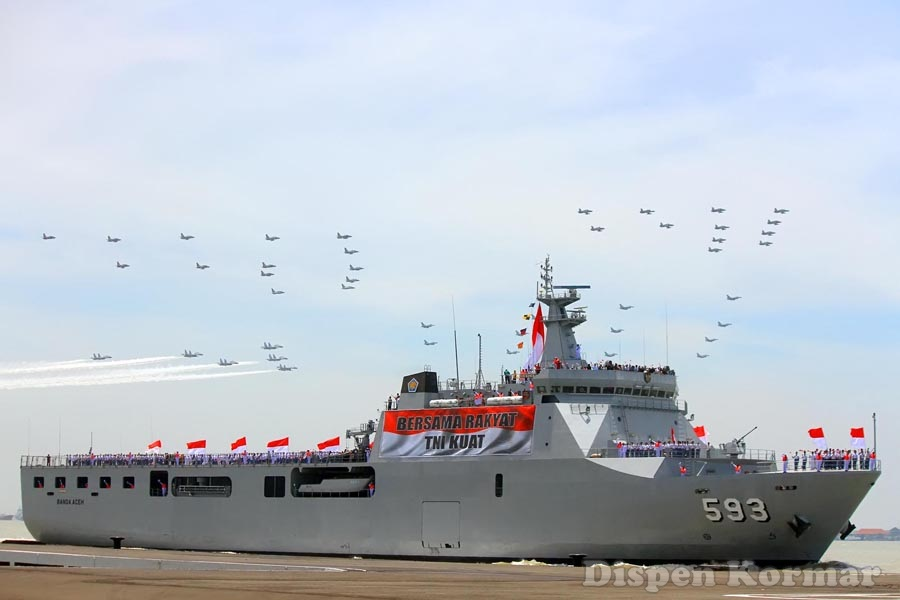
- KRI Banda Aceh on 7 October 2014

History

Indonesia
- Name: Banda Aceh
- Namesake: Banda Aceh
- Ordered: 28 March 2005
- Builder: PT PAL, Surabaya
- Laid down: 7 December 2007
- Launched: 19 March 2010
- Commissioned: 11 November 2013
- Identification: Pennant number: 593
- Status: Active

General characteristics
- Class & type: Makassar-class landing platform dock
- Tonnage: 12,400 tons
- Displacement: 11,300 tons standard displacement; 15,994 tons full displacement
- Length: 122 meters
- Beam: 22 meters
- Height: 56 meters
- Draft: 4.9 meters
- Decks: (Tank Deck); 6.7 meter,(Truck Deck); 11.3 meter
- Propulsion: CODAD, 2 shafts; 2 × MAN B&W 8L28/32A diesel rated at 2666 BHP/1960 kW@ 775 RPM
- Speed: Maximum: 16 knots; Cruising: 14 knots; Economy: 12 knots
- Range: 30 days, up to 10,000 Nm
- Endurance: +45 days
- Boats & landing craft carried: 2 x LCVP
- Capacity: up to 35 infantry vehicles
- Troops: 354 troops
- Complement: accommodations up to 507 persons
- Crew: 126 crew
- Armament: 1 x Bofors 40mm SAK40/L70 2 x 20mm Oerlikon 2 x Mistral Simbad
- Aircraft carried: Up to 5 helicopters
- Aviation facilities: 2 helideck spot (Medium-sized helicopters)

KRI Banda Aceh (593) is the fourth ship of the Makassar-class landing platform dock of the Indonesian Navy.

== Development and design ==
Indonesia signed a US$150 million contract in December 2004 and the first two units were built in Busan, South Korea. The remaining two were built at Indonesia's PT PAL shipyard in Surabaya with assistance from Daesun. The contract for the 3rd and 4th LPD to be built in Indonesia was signed with PT PAL on March 28, 2005.

On 19 October 2006, the first of the two Indonesian-built units was laid down in a ceremony by Admiral Slamet Subiyanto, Chief of Staff, Indonesian Navy. The 3rd and 4th units had been designed to function as flagships with provision for a command and control system, 57mm gun and air defence systems.

The 5th ship was ordered by the Indonesian navy on January 11, 2017. The first steel cutting ceremony for this ship was conducted on April 28, 2017. The ship's keel was laid on August 28. 2017.

== Construction and career ==
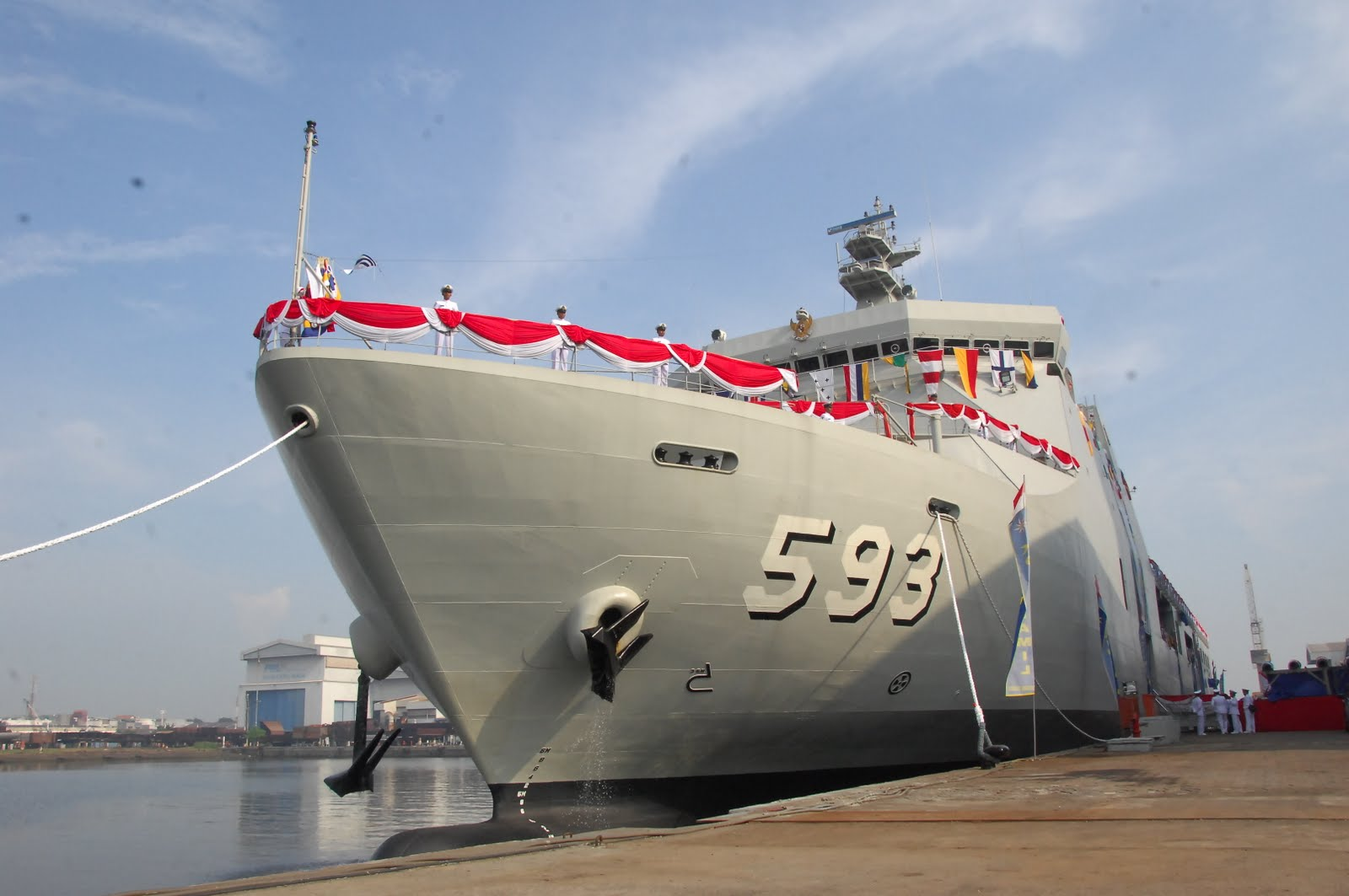
KRI Banda Aceh (593) during the handing over ceremony, 21 March 2011.

Banda Aceh was laid down 7 December 2007 and launched on 19 March 2010 by PT PAL at Surabaya. She was handed over by PT PAL to the Ministry of Defense of the Republic of Indonesia on 21 March 2011, and the commissioning ceremony was held by the Minister of Defense and Indonesian Navy on 11 November 2013.

In June 2014, KRI Banda Aceh (593) participated in RIMPAC 2014.

In December 2014 to January 2015, KRI Banda Aceh (593) became the Command Center ship during the search for the victims of the Indonesia AirAsia Flight 8501 accident, along with numbers of other Indonesian Navy ships; KRI Yos Sudarso (353), KRI Bung Tomo (357), KRI Sultan Hasanuddin (366), KRI Kapitan Pattimura (371), KRI Sutedi Senoputra (378), KRI Todak (631), KRI Pulau Renggat (711) and several Naval Aviation aircraft; including equipment from government agencies and from law enforcements involved in the search and rescue.

On 1 November 2016, KRI Banda Aceh in the Kartika Jala Krida (KJK) Task Force arrived at Royal Australian Navy Fleet Base East, Sydney, Australia, carried out Port Visit until 4 November 2016. She then arrived at Queens Wharf, Auckland, New Zealand on 16 November 2016 and participated in the joint exercise Asean Defence Ministry Meeting (ADMM) Plus FTX on Maritime Security Mahi Tangaroa; and the 2016 International Naval Review (INR) until 22 November 2016.

== Gallery ==
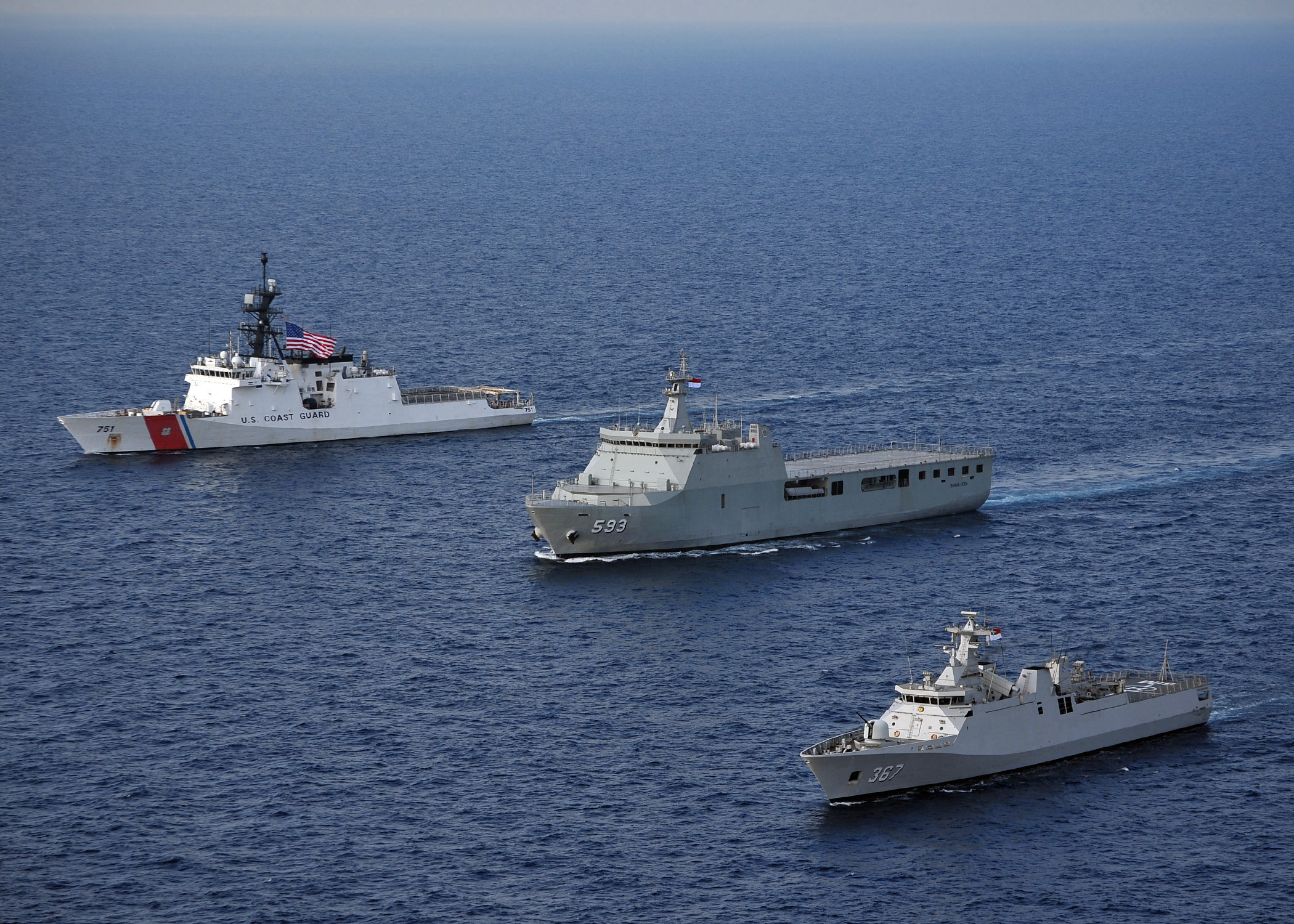
KRI Banda Aceh, KRI Sultan Iskandar Muda and USCGC Waesche on 7 June 2012.

KRI Banda Aceh arrives at Pearl Harbor for RIMPAC on 25 June 2014.
