= Makassar-class landing platform dock =

Class of amphibious warfare ships

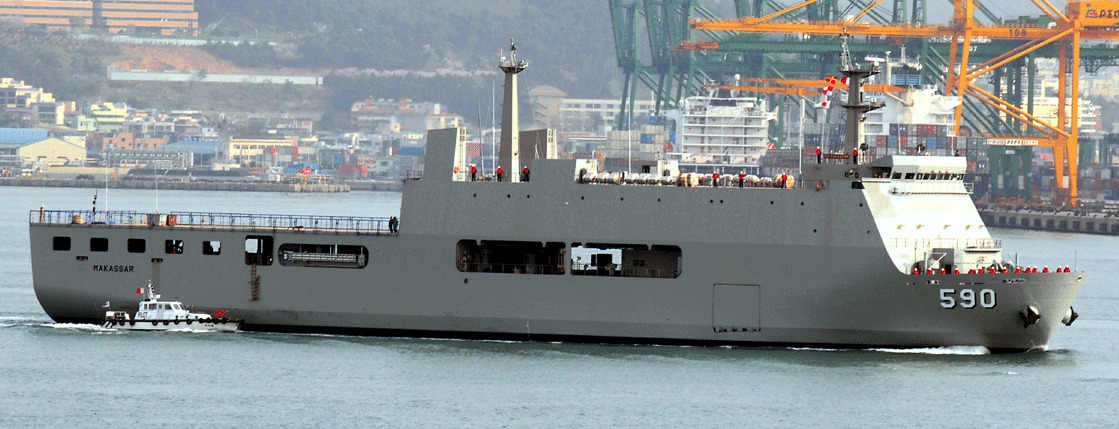
- KRI Makassar (590) circa 2007.

Class overview
- Name: Makassar class
- Builders: DaeSun Shipbuilding (South Korea); PT PAL (Surabaya, Indonesia); SIMA (Callao, Peru)
- Operators: Indonesian Navy; Philippine Navy; Peruvian Navy; Myanmar Navy
- Preceded by: Tanjung Dalpele class (Indonesian Navy)
- Subclasses: Tarlac-class landing platform dock; Sudirohusodo-class hospital ship
- Cost: LPD 122–125m: USD37.5 million ~ USD50.5 million. LPD 163m: ~USD408 million.
- On order: 3
- Completed: 12
- Active: 12

General characteristics
- Type: Landing Platform Dock
- Tonnage: 12,400 tons
- Displacement: 11,300 tons standard displacement; 15,994 tons full displacement
- Length: 122 m (400 ft 3 in) ~ 143 m (469 ft 2 in) (for Indonesian version); 122 m (400 ft 3 in) (for Peruvian version); 123 m (403 ft 7 in) (for Philippines version ); 125 m (410 ft 1 in) (for Myanmar version ); 163 m (534 ft 9 in) (for United Arab Emirates version )
- Beam: 22 m (72 ft 2 in)
- Height: 56 m (183 ft 9 in)
- Draft: 4.9 m (16 ft 1 in)
- Decks: Tank Deck: 6.7 m (22 ft 0 in); Truck Deck: 11.3 m (37 ft 1 in)
- Propulsion: CODAD, 2 shafts; 2 × MAN B&W 8L28/32A diesel rated at 2666 BHP/1960 kW@ 775 RPM
- Speed: Maximum: 16 knots (30 km/h; 18 mph); Cruising: 14 knots (26 km/h; 16 mph); Economy: 12 knots (22 km/h; 14 mph)
- Range: 30 days, up to 10,000 nmi (19,000 km; 12,000 mi)
- Endurance: +45 days
- Boats & landing craft carried: 2 x LCU
- Capacity: up to 35 infantry vehicles
- Troops: 354 troops
- Complement: accommodations up to 507 persons
- Crew: 126 crew
- Armament: 1 x Bofors 40mm SAK40/L70; or 1 x Leonardo OTO Twin 40L70 Compact (Stealth) (installed on all ships (590 to 594); 2 x 20mm Oerlikon; 2 x Mistral Simbad
- Aircraft carried: Up to 5 helicopters
- Aviation facilities: 2 helideck spot (Medium-sized helicopters)

The Makassar class is a class of South Korean-designed Landing Platform Dock. The lead ship is named after the city of Makassar in Sulawesi and built in Busan, South Korea. The ships were designed by Daesun Shipbuilding & Engineering Co. based on their earlier design of Tanjung Dalpele class that was sold to the Indonesian Navy.

== Exports ==
=== Indonesia ===
Indonesia signed a US$150 million contract in December 2004 and the first two units were built in Busan, South Korea. The remaining two were built at Indonesia's PT PAL shipyard in Surabaya with assistance from Daesun.The contract for the 3rd and 4th LPD to be built in Indonesia was signed with PT PAL on March 28, 2005.

On 19 October 2006, the first of the two Indonesian-built units, was laid down in a ceremony by Admiral Slamet Subiyanto, Chief of Staff, Indonesian Navy. The 3rd and 4th units had been designed to function as flagships with provisions for a command and control system, 57mm gun and air defence systems.

The 5th ship ordered by Indonesian navy on January 11, 2017. First steel cutting ceremony for said ship was conducted on April 28, 2017. The ship's keel was laid on August 28. 2017.

=== Philippines ===
The Philippine Navy selected a variant of the Makassar class design from PT PAL, called the Tarlac class for its Strategic Sealift Vessel (SSV) programme following competitive bidding in 2013, and the contract for two units was signed on 23 January 2014. The first unit was laid down at PT PAL Surabaya on 22 January 2015 and the second unit was laid down on 5 June 2015.

On June 24, 2022 PT PAL signed a contract with Philippine Department of Defence for the purchase of an additional two units. According to PT PAL, these new ships will improve upon previous Tarlac class SSVs, allowing it to sail in waters up to sea state 6, as well as operating ship facilities at sea state 4. The First Steel Cutting of the third unit was carried out on 10 August 2023. The third unit was laid down at PT PAL Surabaya on 22 January 2024, together with the First Steel Cutting of the fourth unit. The fourth unit was laid down on 29 May 2024.

On 28 August 2025 it was reported that the follow-on orders of the Tarlac class suffered delays after PT PAL missed four milestone accomplishments stipulated on the contract.

The third unit was launched by PT PAL in their shipyard in Surabaya on 30 June 2026.

=== Peru ===
The Peruvian Navy selected the Makassar class for the Buque Multipropósito program from Dae Sun Shipbuilding and Engineering Co. in 2012. First ship of the class was laid down in the SIMA Callao shipyard on July 12, 2013; A second unit was also constructed.

=== Malaysia ===
During Indo Defence 2016, a MoU was signed between Indonesia's PT PAL and Malaysia's Boustead Naval Shipyard (BNS) for a collaboration on the Royal Malaysian Navy's new class of multirole support ship (MRSS), based on an enlarged Makassar-class LPD, which would have an overall length of 150m.

=== Myanmar ===
In 2019, Dae Sun Shipbuilding of South Korea built a Makassar-class LPD named UMS Moattama for the Myanmar Navy.

=== Brazil ===
In 2019 the Peruvian Navy, offered a new Peruvian built Makassar class to Brazil for US$170m, in exchange for 2 used Type 209 submarines. On October 24, Brazilian Vice President Hamilton Mourão signed a Declaration of Intent with the Peruvian government for this exchange.

=== United Arab Emirates ===
On 1 July 2022, United Arab Emirates Navy signed a Memorandum of Understanding (MoU) with PT PAL Indonesia for the purchase one 163 meters version of Makassar-class LPD which planned to start the construction at 2024.

The United Arab Emirates (UAE) signed a contract worth 1.5 billion AED (equivalent to US$408 million) with PT PAL Indonesia for the procurement of a 163-meter multi-mission vessel, specifically a Landing Platform Dock 163M during the IDEX 2023 show in Abu Dhabi from 20 to 24 February 2023.

The First Steel Cutting ceremony for Landing Platform Dock 163M – Al Maryah Project was carried out on 28 February 2024, and Key Laid Ceremony was carried out on 24 April 2024.

== Ships of class ==
Name	Hull Number	Builder	Operator	Laid Down	Launched	Commissioned	Status
Makassar class
KRI Makassar	590	DaeSun Shipbuilding	Indonesian Navy		7 December 2006	29 April 2007	Active
KRI Surabaya	591	DaeSun Shipbuilding	Indonesian Navy	7 December 2006	23 March 2007	1 August 2007	Active
Banjarmasin subclass
KRI Banjarmasin	592	PAL Indonesia	Indonesian Navy	19 October 2006	28 August 2008	28 November 2009	Active
KRI Banda Aceh	593	PAL Indonesia	Indonesian Navy	7 December 2007	19 March 2010	21 March 2011	Active
Semarang subclass
KRI Semarang	594	PAL Indonesia	Indonesian Navy	28 August 2017	3 August 2018	21 January 2019	Active
Sudirohusodo subclass
KRI dr. Wahidin Sudirohusodo	991	PAL Indonesia	Indonesian Navy	14 October 2019	7 January 2021	14 January 2022	Active
KRI dr. Radjiman Wedyodiningrat	992	PAL Indonesia	Indonesian Navy	21 January 2021	15 August 2022	19 January 2023	Active
Tarlac subclass
BRP Tarlac	LD-601	PAL Indonesia	Philippine Navy	22 January 2015	18 January 2016	1 June 2016	Active
BRP Davao del Sur	LD-602	PAL Indonesia	Philippine Navy	5 June 2015	29 September 2016	31 May 2017	Active
BRP Ilocos Norte	LD-603	PAL Indonesia	Philippine Navy	22 January 2024	30 June 2026		Fitting Out
BRP Leyte	LD-604	PAL Indonesia	Philippine Navy	29 May 2024			Ordered (First Steel Cutting on 22 January 2024)
Pisco subclass
BAP Pisco	AMP-156	SIMA	Peruvian Navy	12 July 2013	25 April 2017	6 June 2018	Active
BAP Paita	AMP-157P	SIMA	Peruvian Navy	14 December 2017	9 December 2022	27 July 2025	Active
Moattama subclass
UMS Moattama	1501	DaeSun Shipbuilding	Myanmar Navy		July 2019	24 December 2019	Active
UAE-variant
Tbd	Tbd	PAL Indonesia	United Arab Emirates Navy	24 April 2024			Ordered(First Steel Cutting on 28 February 2024)
