= BAP Pisco (AMP-156) =

Makassar-class landing platform dock of the Peruvian Navy

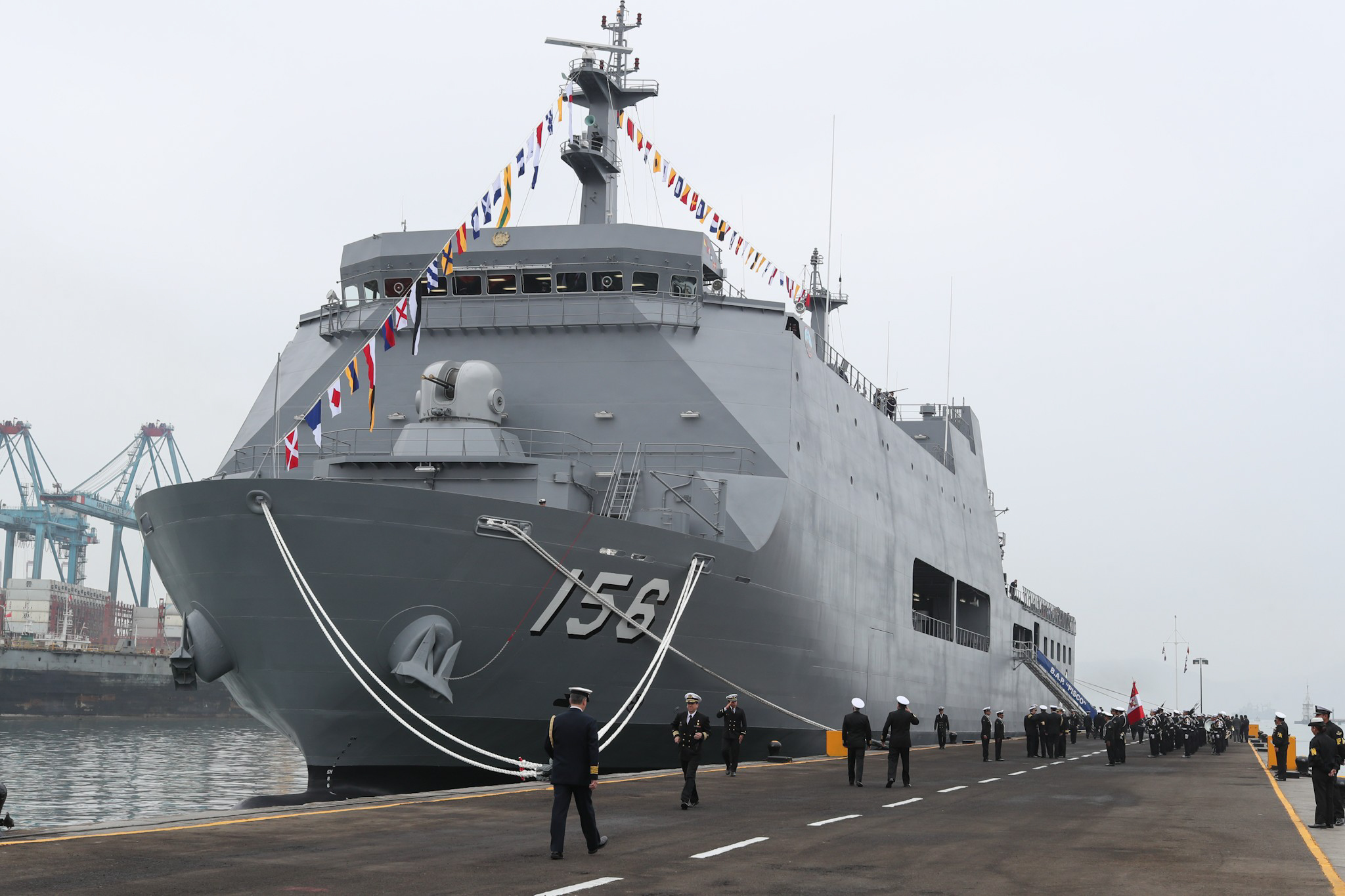
- BAP Pisco (AMP-156)

Peru
- Name: BAP Pisco (AMP-156)
- Builder: SIMA
- Laid down: 12 July 2013
- Launched: 25 April 2017
- Commissioned: 6 June 2018
- Status: in active service

General characteristics
- Class & type: Makassar-class Landing Platform Dock
- Tonnage: 8400 tons
- Displacement: 7,300 tons standard displacement; 11,394 tons full displacement
- Length: 122 meters
- Beam: 22 meters
- Height: 56 meters
- Draft: 4.9 meters
- Decks: (Tank Deck); 6.7 meter, (Truck Deck); 11.3 meter
- Propulsion: CODAD, 2 shafts; 2 × MAN B&W 8L28/32A diesel rated at 2666 BHP/1960 kW@ 775 RPM
- Speed: Maximum: 16 knots; Cruising: 14 knots; Economy: 12 knots
- Range: 30 days, up to 10,000 nmi
- Endurance: +45 days
- Sensors & processing systems: Escribano M&E OTEOS Electro-Optical Sensor; Escribano M&E SCAMO Weapon Control System
- Armament: 1 × OTO Melara Twin 40 mm/L70 DARDO CIWS; 2 × Escribano M&E SENTINEL 30 RWS+EOS with Mk44 Bushmaster II 30 mm autocannon; 4 × Escribano M&E SENTINEL 2.0 RWS+EOS with M2 Browning 12.7 mm machine gun

BAP Pisco (AMP-156) is a Makassar-class landing platform dock belonging to the Peruvian Navy that was built between 2013 - 2017 by Shipyard Marine Industrial Services of Peru, known as SIMA.

== History ==
=== Design and planning ===
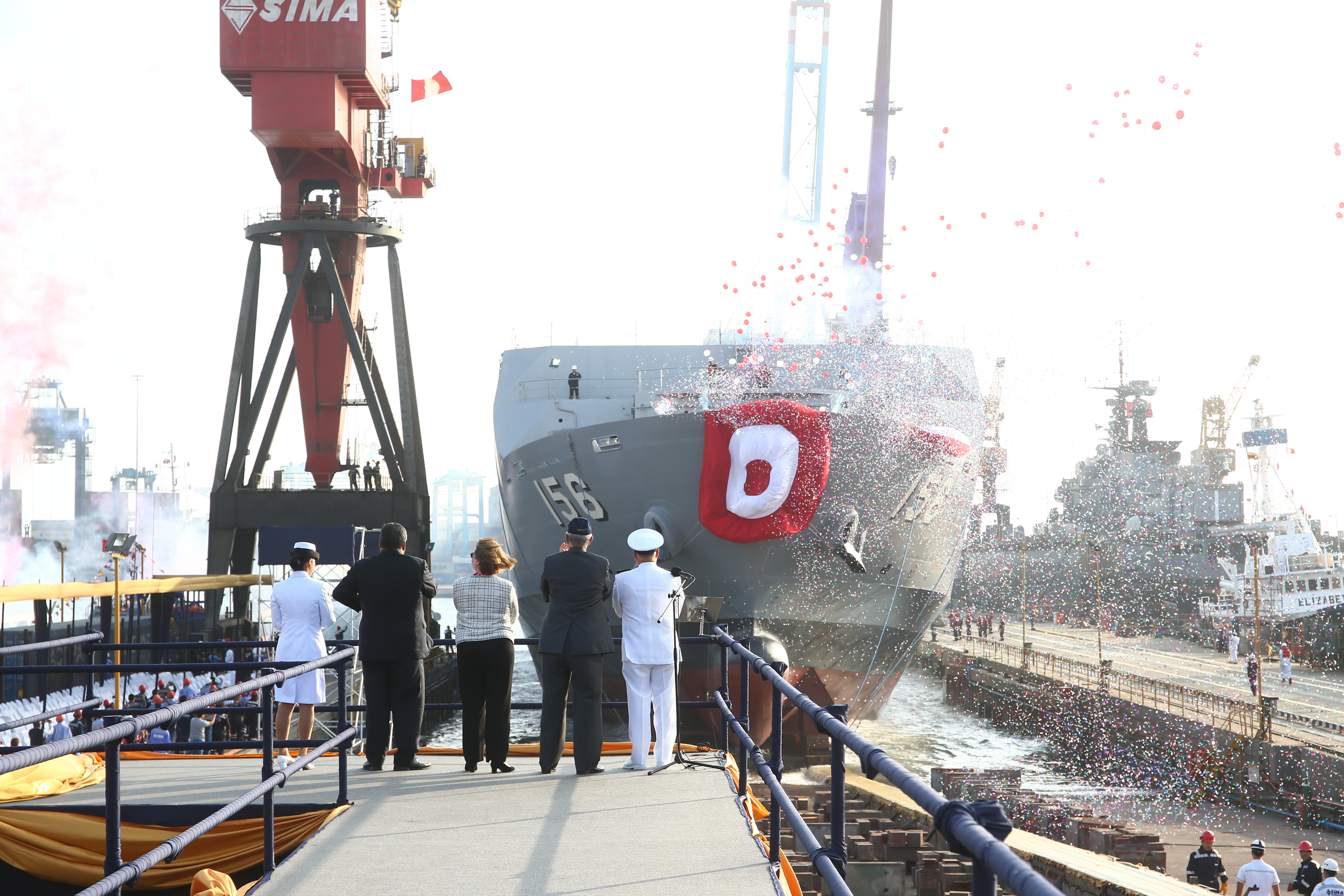
BAP Pisco's launching

The design of the Pisco was carried out by South Korea's Daesun Shipbuilding & Engineering Co., Ltd. in collaboration with Peru's state-owned shipyard, SIMA. It is a Makassar-class landing platform dock, with the class originally being developed in the early-2000s for the Indonesian Navy.

When the Peruvian Ministry of Defense released a memorandum on 10 April 2012 for two Makassar-class LPDs and in early 2013, Peru paid a contract of $60 million to construct the Pisco, the first of the two LPDs designated for the Peruvian Navy. The Pisco would then be constructed in Peru by SIMA with the continued cooperation from Daesun Shipbuilding & Marine Engineering.

Pisco's design includes the accommodation of 157 crew members and up to 400 marines. The well deck can handle two 23-meter Landing Craft Vehicle Personnel, while an additional cargo deck in the ship can hold up to 14 LAV II vehicles, which Peru acquired from Canada in mid-2016.

The flight deck of the Pisco has the capability of holding two Sikorsky SH-3 Sea King helicopters of the Peruvian Naval Aviation, while an incorporated hangar can store an additional helicopter. The ship uses a roll-on/roll-off system, and can reportedly transport 450 troops for up to 30 days.

=== Construction ===
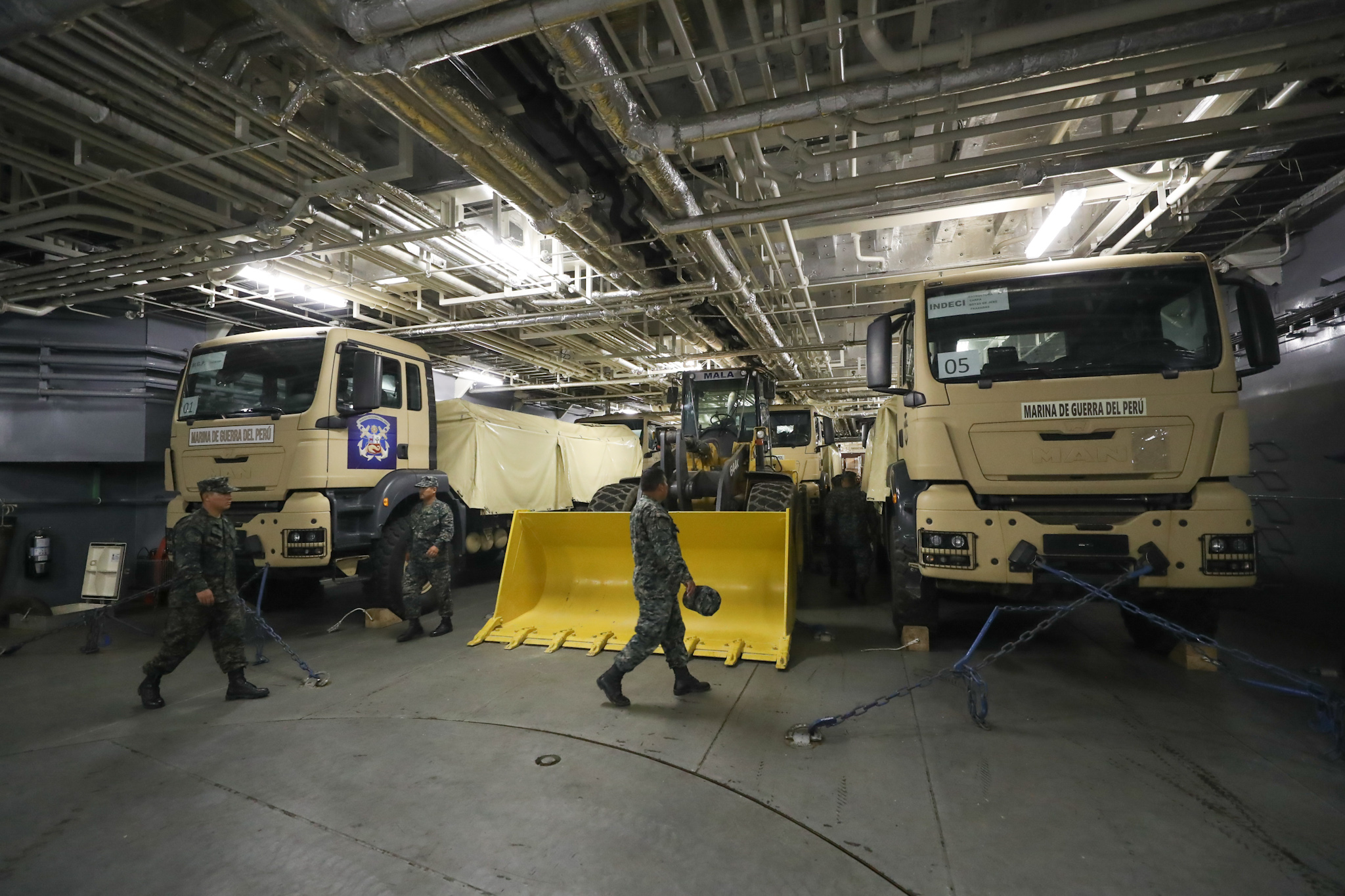
BAP Pisco's hangar

The Pisco was laid down on 12 July 2013, though real progress on construction began in late-2014. The ship (hull) was launched on 25 April 2017, and was expected to be delivered to the fleet in August 2018. In April 2018, the ship started sea trials. She was commissioned on 6 July 2018.

=== Service ===
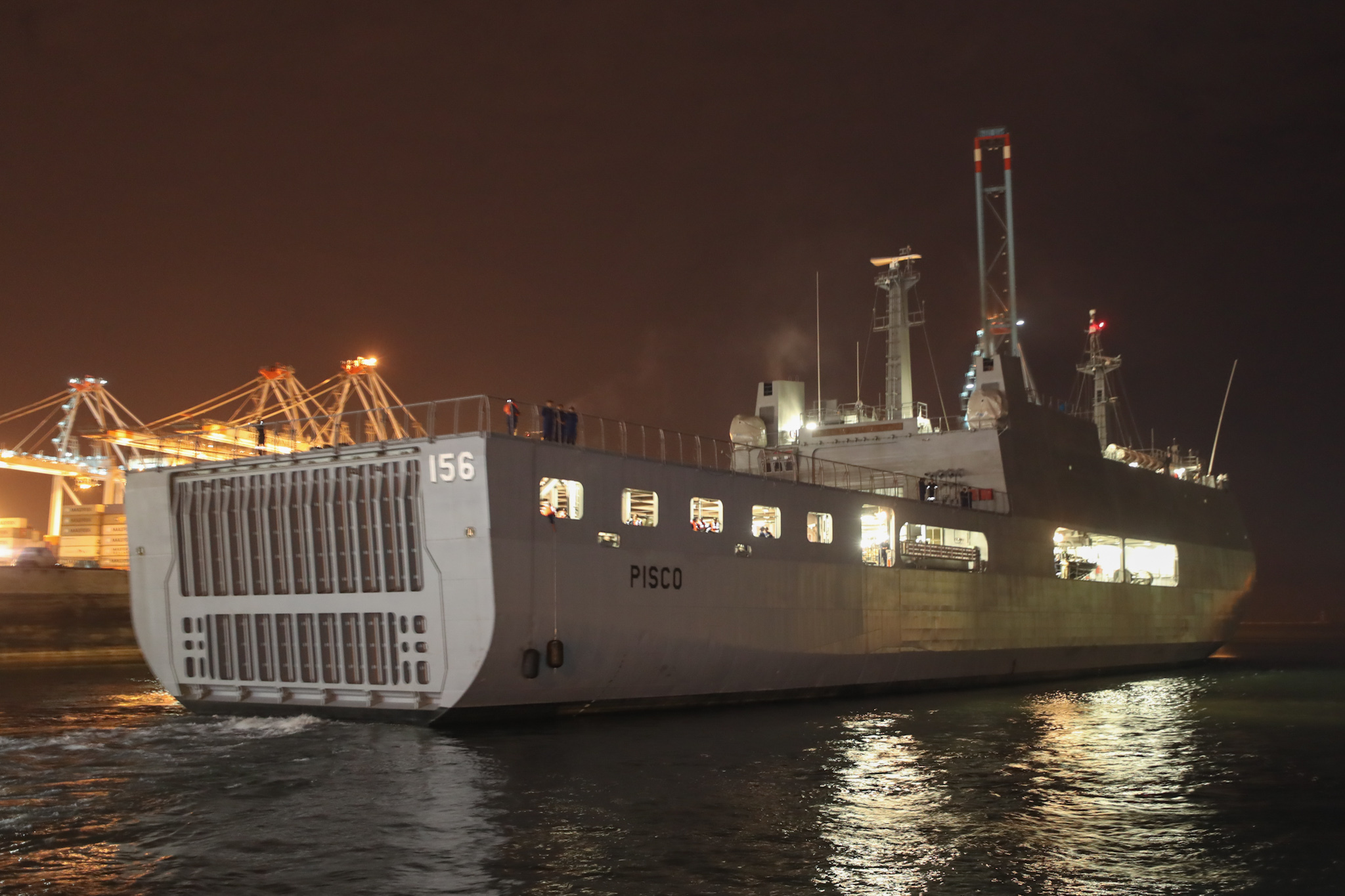
BAP Pisco stern view

One of the Pisco's first tasks began on 11 February 2019, requiring the ship to deliver 500 tons of humanitarian aid from Callao to Arequipa, Moquegua and Tacna in response to heavy rains and landslides in southern Peru.
