= DARDO =

DARDO OTO Twin 40L70
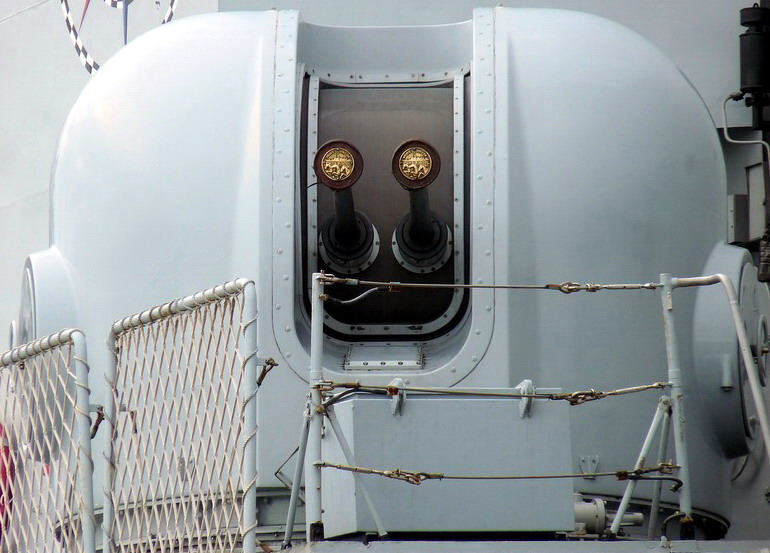
- Type: Gun-based CIWS
- Place of origin: Italy

Production history
- Manufacturer: OTO Melara
- Variants: Compact, Fast Forty, Marlin

Specifications
- Mass: Complete gun mount (with ammunition): 5,400–5,600 kg (11,900–12,300 lb); Complete round (HE): 4.05 kg (8.9 lb)
- Height: Enclosed turret: 2.4 m (7 ft 10 in); Type A mount: 1.3 m (4 ft 3 in); Type B mount: 0.92 m (3 ft 0 in)
- Diameter: Mount ring: 1.7 m (5 ft 7 in); Working circle: 2.902 m (9 ft 6.3 in)
- Caliber: 40×364 mmR
- Barrels: 2 × Breda-built Bofors-40 mm L/70
- Elevation: Minimum −13° Maximum +85° speed: 60°/s (70°/s Fast Forty)
- Traverse: Full 360° traverse, speed: 90°/s (100°/s Fast Forty)
- Rate of fire: 2 × 300 round/min (Compact & Marlin); 2 × 450 round/min (Fast Forty)
- Effective firing range: HE round: 4,000 m (4,400 yd)
- Maximum firing range: 12,500 m (7.8 mi) (maximum height 8,700 m (28,500 ft))
- Feed system: Magazine: Compact: 736 HE rounds on Type A mount or 444 HE rounds on Type B mount; Single Fast Forty: Dual feed mechanism with 144 HE or APFSDS rounds; Twin Fast Forty: Dual feed mechanism with 736 HE rounds & 200 APFSDS rounds on Type A mount or 444 HE rounds & 200 APFSDS rounds on Type B mount; Marlin: Dual feed mechanism with 80 ready-to-fire round

DARDO ("Dart" in Italian) originally known as Breda Type-70, also marketed as the OTO Twin 40L70 Compact, is a gun-based close-in weapon system (CIWS) built by the Italian companies Breda and OTO Melara. It is composed of two Breda-built Bofors 40 mm firing high explosive (HE) shells, a fire-control radar (Alenia RTN-10X Orion) and a fire-control system (Alenia RTN-20X Orion and Dardo). It is the last of a long series of Italian anti-aircraft weapons derived from the Swedish Bofors 40 mm autocannons (mounted on Breda built gun mounts such as the Type 64, Type 106, Type 107, Type 564 and Type 520).

== Purpose ==
The system's primary purpose is to defend against anti-ship missiles, unmanned aerial vehicles and other precision guided weapons. It can also be employed against conventional and rotary-wing aircraft, surface ships, small water-crafts, coastal targets and floating mines.

== Installation ==
DARDO is installed in an enclosed turret with two different mounts: the Type A with 440-round internal and 292-round under-deck magazines; and Type B with only the 440-round internal magazine (Type B requires no deck penetration). However, the most recent OTO Twin 40L70 Compact's brochure nominates 736-round magazine for Type A and 444-round magazine for Type B, both feature deck non-deck penetration or with deck penetration.

The newest Marlin 40 variant has no deck penetration, having a sole internal magazine for 80 ready-to-fire rounds.

== Other versions ==
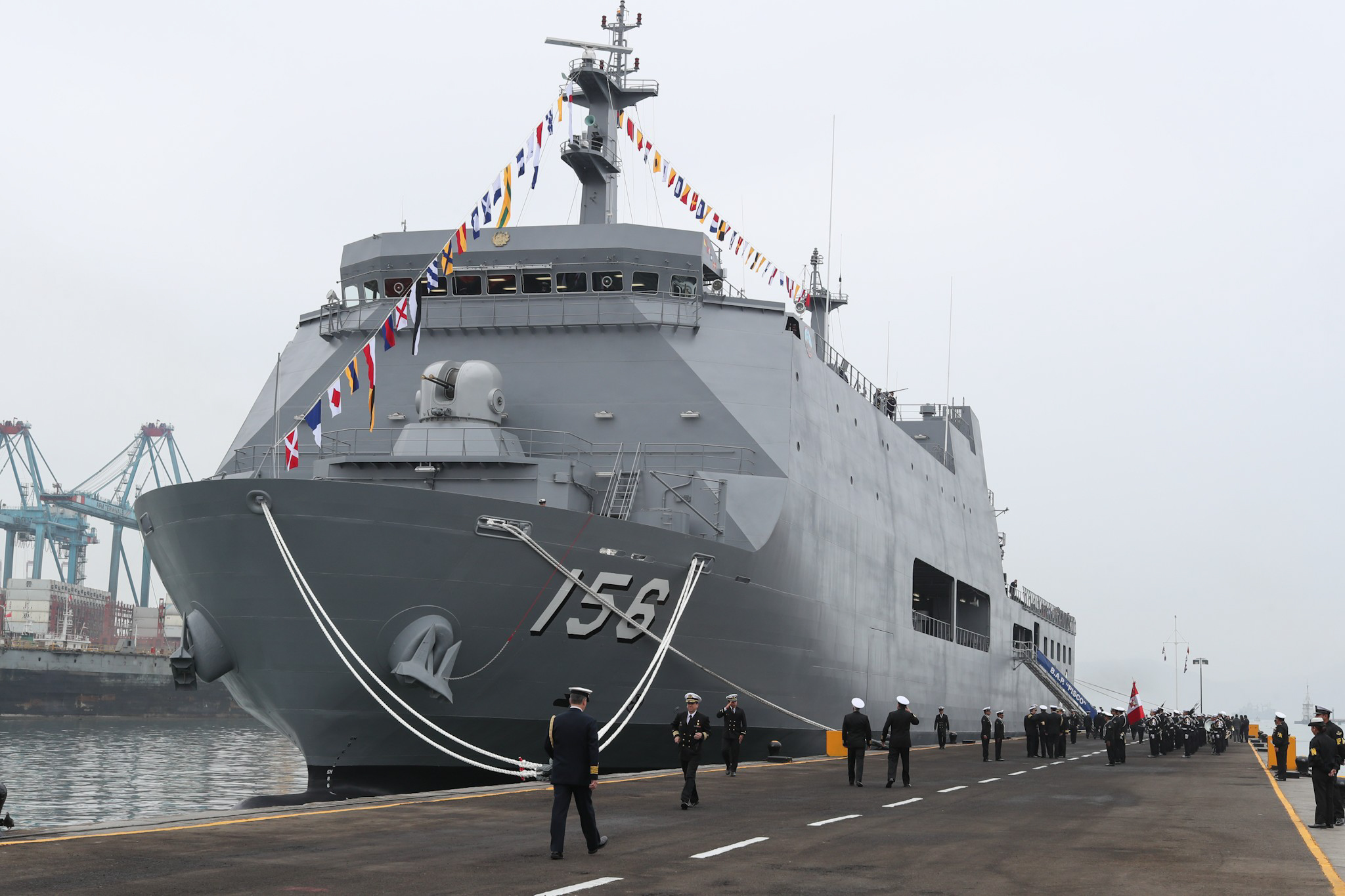
DARDO Compact mounting on Peruvian navy landing platform dock, BAP Pisco (AMP-156).

=== Compact ===
The OTO Twin 40L70 Compact is the current marketing name for the DARDO. Option for a stealth cupola is available to reduce the gun mount's RCS. They come in Type A version with 736 round magazine & Type B version with 444 round magazine. Both the Type A and Type B mounting can be installed above-deck (non-penetrating) or with below-deck magazine. The compact mounting has maximum fire rate of 600 round/min (300 round/min × 2). A kit to upgrade Compact mounting to Fast Forty standard is available.

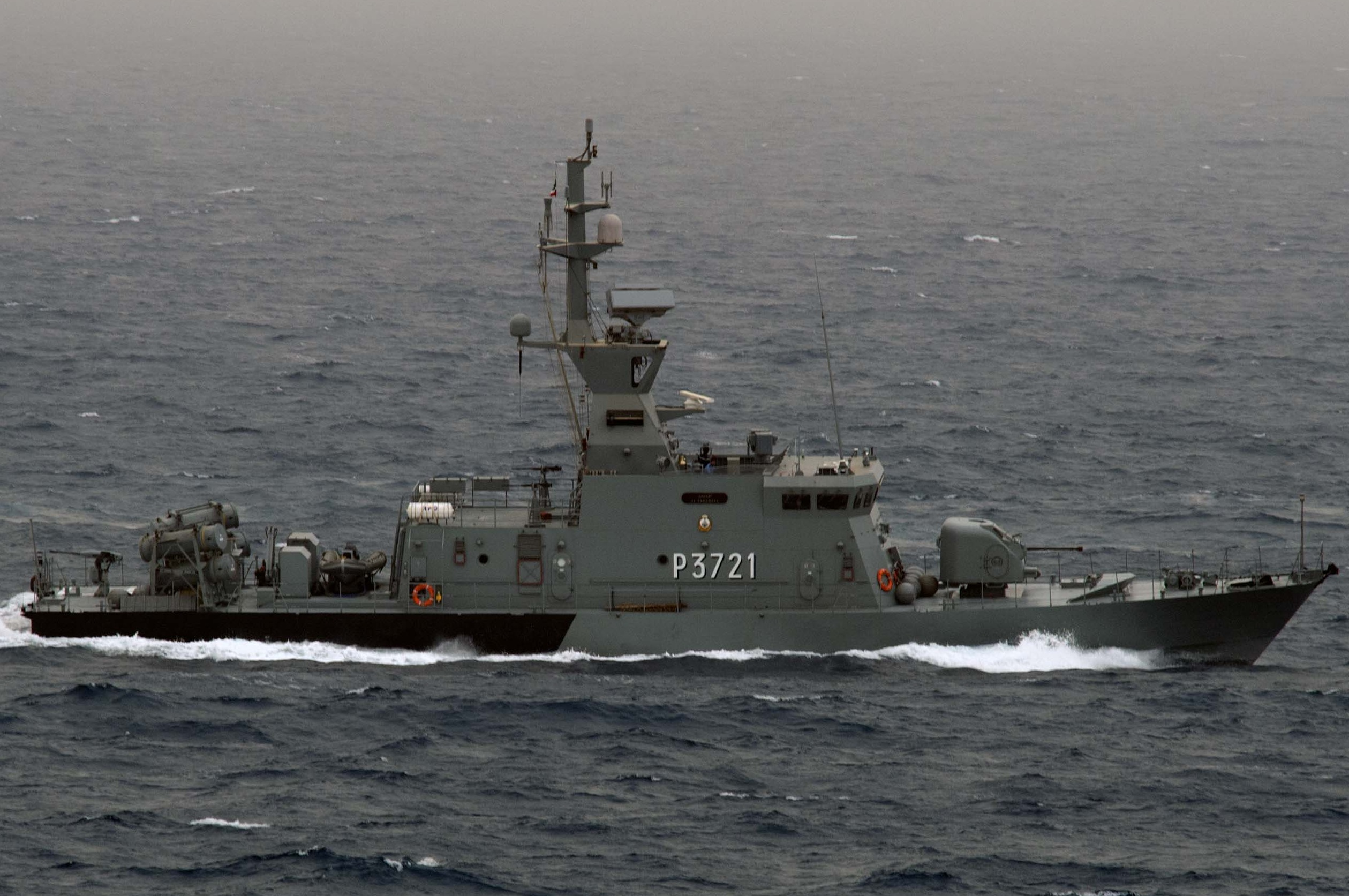
Single Fast Forty mounting on Kuwaiti navy Um Al Maradim-class missile boat, Al Fahaheel (P3721).

=== Fast Forty ===
The Fast Forty is an improved version of the Compact mounting with a higher fire rate of 900 round/min (450 round/min × 2), dual magazine and dual feed mechanism to allow switching from High Explosive (HE) rounds to Armour-Piercing Fin-Stabilized Discarding Sabot (APFSDS) rounds when a target gets within 1,000 meters from the vessel. Produced in both Single-barrel (Single Fast Forty) and Twin-barrel (Twin Fast Forty) forms, the Fast Forty include a revision of some parts of the loading and breech mechanism and the use of titanium material to improve the performance compared to the Compact mounting. Ammunition magazine and feed arrangements of the Twin Fast Forty remain the same as the Compact but operate at a higher speed. The gun laying and acceleration rates were increased, while the barrel/barrels, are secured in a barrel guidance frames to improves accuracy.

The Single Fast Forty has on-mounting ammunition capacity of only 144 round and are available in three types of mounting:

- Type A: unmanned mounting, with all operation are done via remote control,
- Type B: manned mounting, controlled and aimed by an on-turret operator,
- Type C: unmanned mounting, feature an integral Micro Fire Control System (MFCS) with automatic tracking and fire-control computation.

An optional 'Stealth' cupola that provided a significant reduction in the radar cross-section of the mounting are also available.

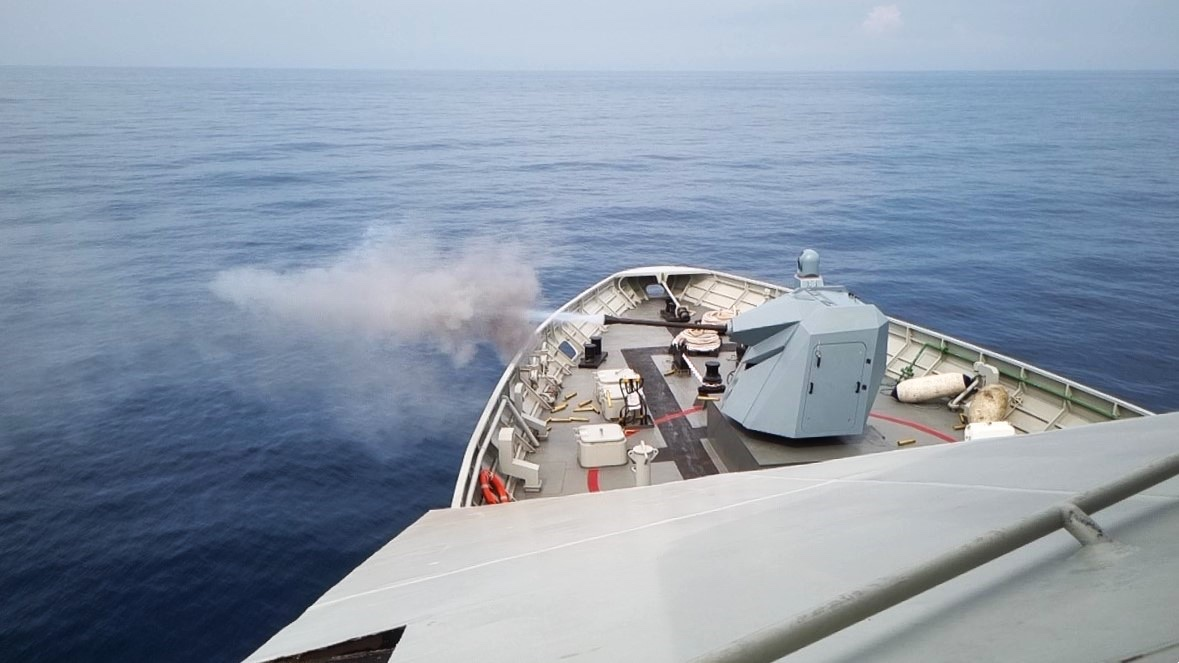
OTO Marlin 40 (ILOS) mounting on Indonesian navy corvette, KRI Bung Karno (369).

=== Marlin ===
The OTO Marlin 40 is the single-barrel, light-weight and no-deck-penetration derivative of the DARDO family, succeeding the Single Fast Forty variant. It is designed with high autonomy and fully-digitalized systems. The mounting used to be known as OTO Melara Forty Light naval gun system.

The system comes in a basic version called "Remotely Controlled" (RC), which can be managed by an external firing control system and in the advanced version called "Independent Line Of Sight" (ILOS), which can be operated autonomously via a local control console in addition to be fully controlled by Combat Management System. It also has selectable rate of fire ranging from single shot, 100 round/min and 300 round/min. The Marlin 40 may be fitted with an integrated hoist below-deck to enable the ammunition loading from covered position. Leonardo also announce the development of the ILOS variant combined with vehicle or trailer mounting for ground-based air defense system known as the Hystrix 40 ADS optimized for C-UAS role. The prototype of the said system were scheduled to be revealed by the end of 2026.

== Comparison with current CIWS ==
Comparison of some modern CIWS
	(Russia) AK-630	(United States) Phalanx CIWS	(Netherlands) Goalkeeper CIWS	(Italy) DARDO
Weight	9,114 kg (20,093 lb)	6,200 kg (13,700 lb)	9,902 kg (21,830 lb)	5,500 kg (12,100 lb)
Armament	30 mm (1.2 in) 6 barreled GSh-6-30 Gatling Gun	20 mm (0.79 in) 6 barreled M61 Vulcan Gatling Gun	30 mm (1.2 in) 7 barreled GAU-8 Gatling Gun	40 mm (1.6 in) 2 barreled Bofors 40 mm
Rate of Fire	5,000 rounds per minute	4,500 rounds per minute	4,200 rounds per minute	600/900 round per minute
(effective/ flat-trajectory) Range	4,000 m (13,000 ft)	2,000 m (6,600 ft)	3,600 m (11,800 ft)	4,000 m (13,000 ft)
Ammunition storage	2,000 rounds	1,550 rounds	1,190 rounds	736 rounds
Muzzle velocity	900 m (3,000 ft) per second	1,100 m (3,600 ft) per second	1,109 m (3,638 ft) per second	1,000 m (3,300 ft) per second
Elevation	−13 to +78 degrees	−75 to +55 degrees	−75 to +64 degrees	−13 to +85 degrees
Traverse	360 degrees	-150 to +150 degrees	360 degrees	360 degrees

== Operators ==
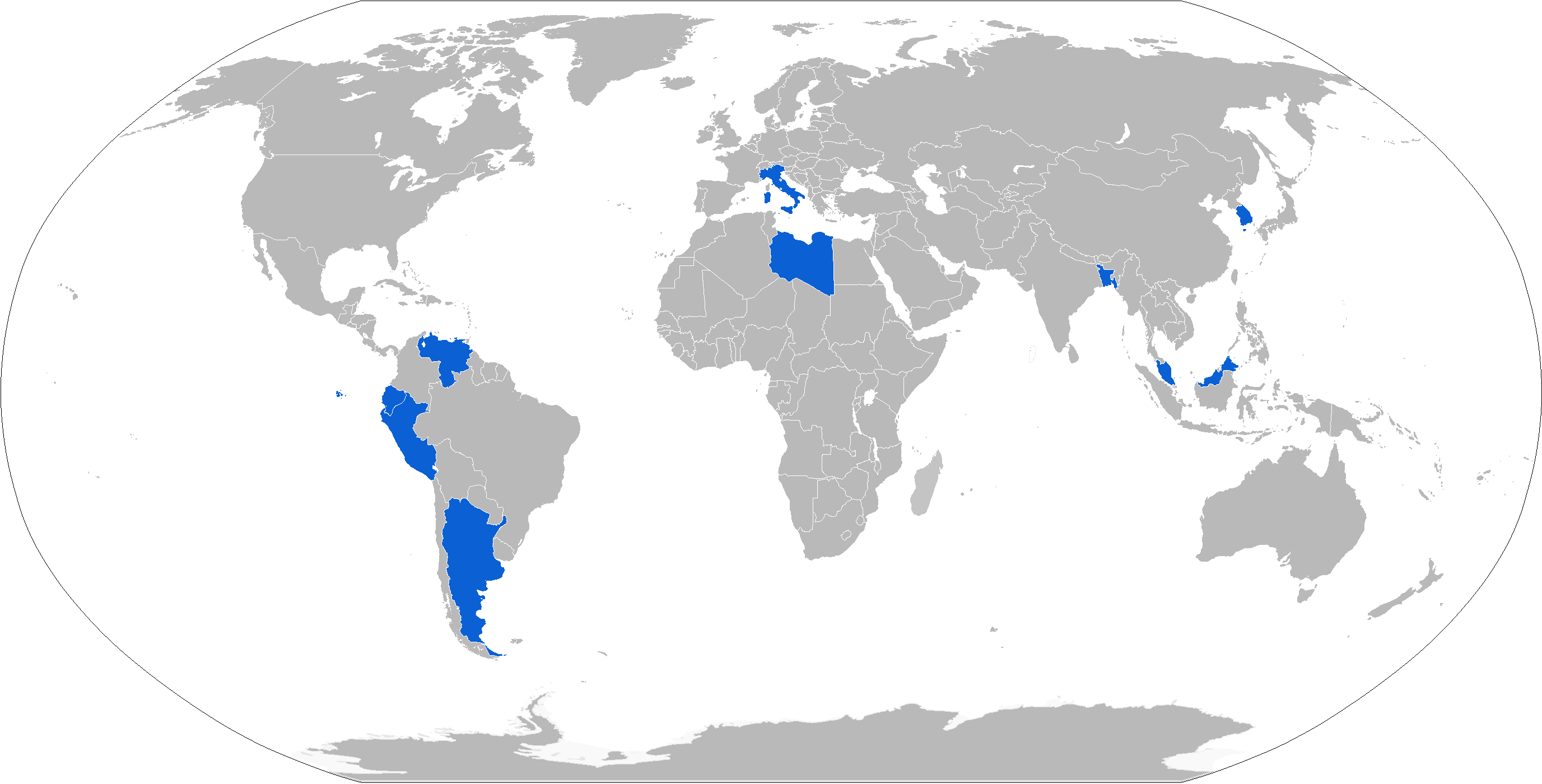
Map of DARDO operators in blue

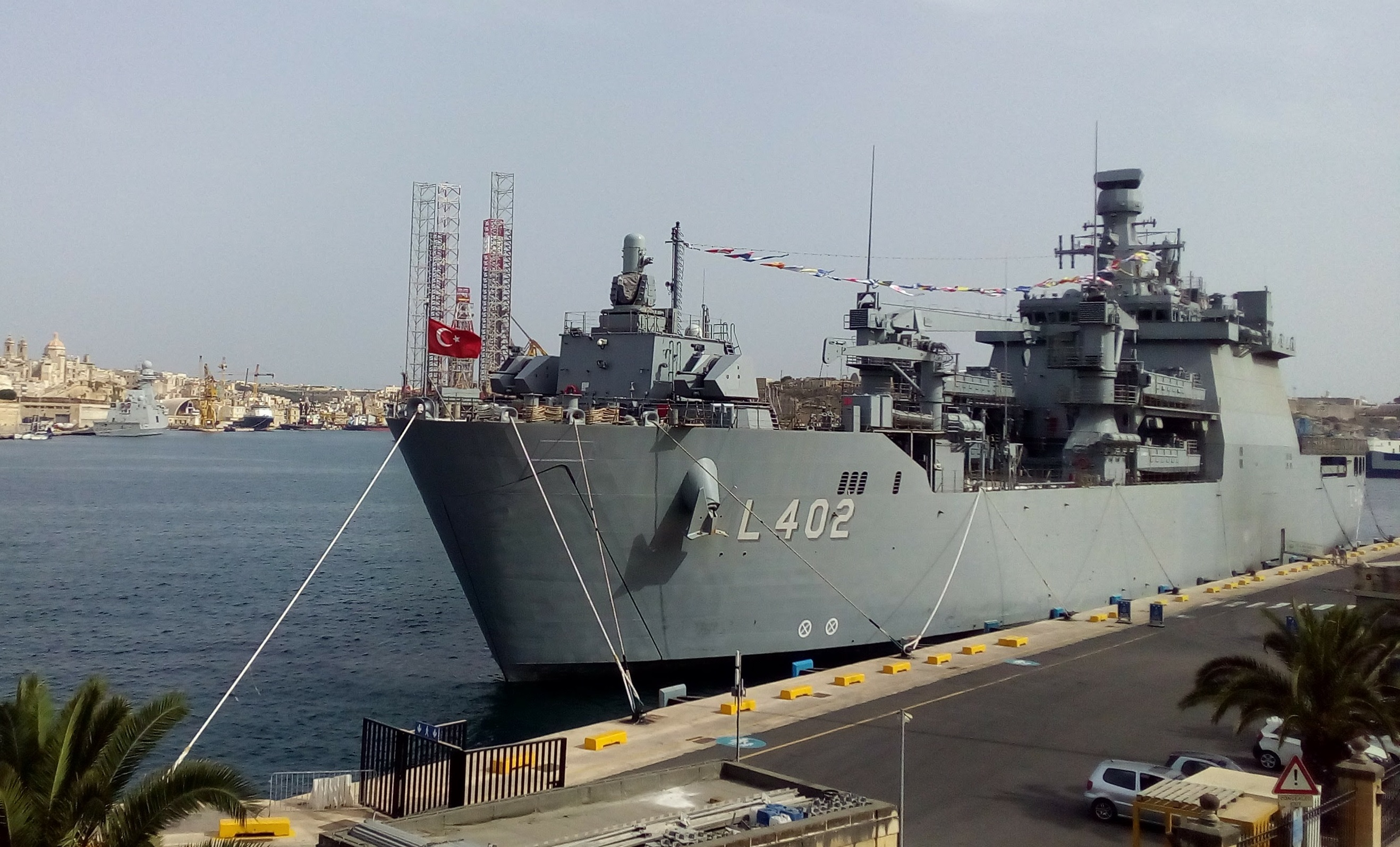
Single Fast Forty mounting with stealth cupola on Turkish navy landing ship tank, TCG Bayraktar (L-402).

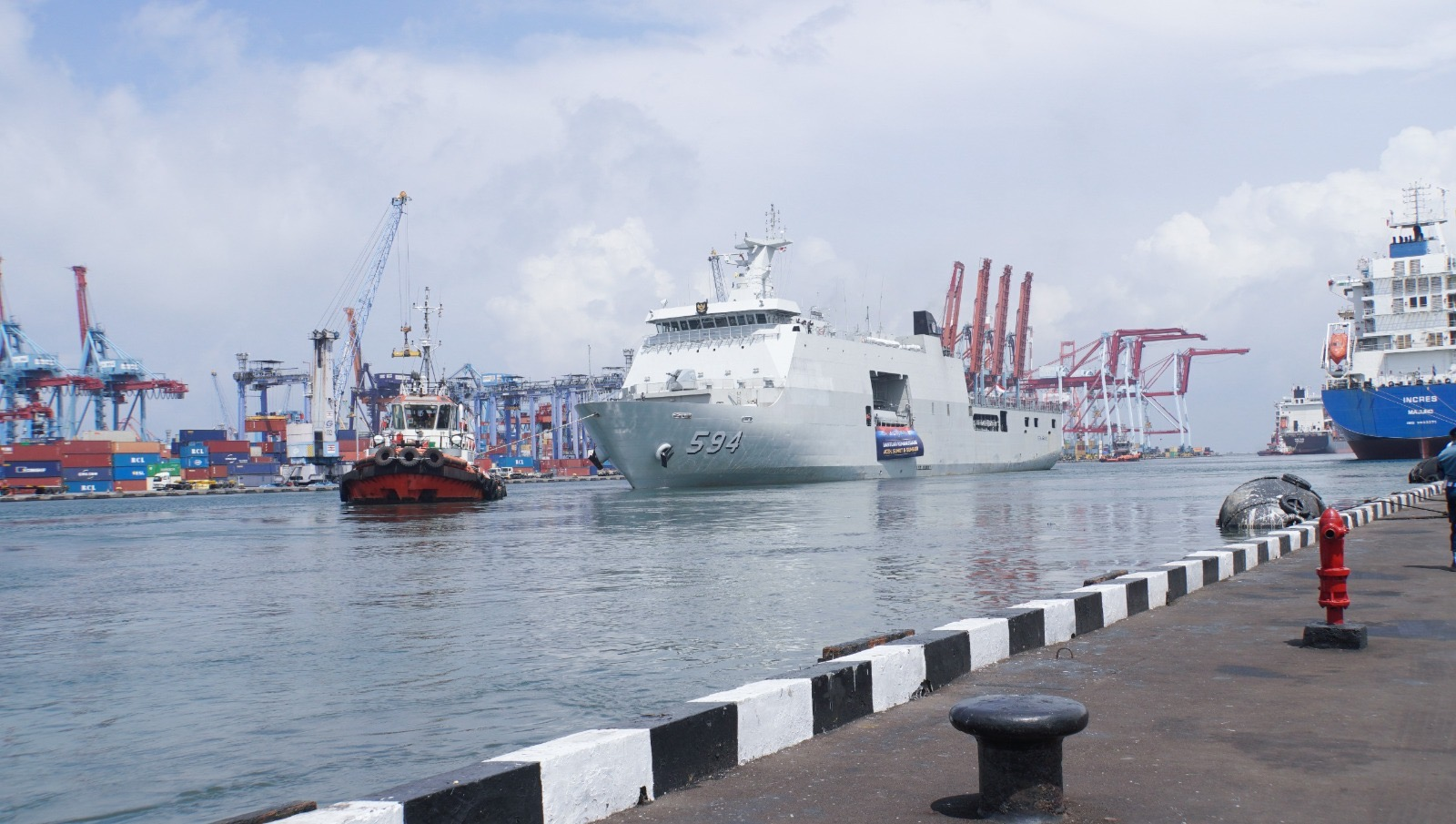
OTO Twin 40L70 Compact with stealth cupola on Indonesian navy landing platform dock, KRI Semarang (594).

=== All Operators ===
- Algeria
  - Kalaat Beni Hammed-class landing ship
- Argentina
  - Almirante Brown-class destroyer
  - Espora-class corvette^{video}
  - Drummond-class corvette
- Bahrain
  - Al Manama-class corvette
  - Ahmed Al Fateh-class missile boat
  - Al Riffa-class patrol boat
- Bangladesh
  - Twin Fast Forty
    - BNS Khalid Bin Walid
- Colombia
  - Almirante Padilla-class frigate
  - ARC 20 de Julio-class offshore patrol vessel
- Ecuador
  - Esmeraldas-class corvette
- Egypt
  - Pohang-class corvette
  - Ramadan-class missile boat
- Ghana
  - Achimota-class missile boat
- Indonesia
  - DARDO
    - Sriwijaya-class aircraft carrier
  - OTO Twin 40L70 Compact (Stealth)
    - Raja Haji Fisabilillah-class offshore patrol vessel
    - Makassar-class landing platform dock
    - Semarang-class landing platform dock
    - Paiton Naval Gunnery Firing Range
  - OTO Marlin 40 (ILOS)
    - Bung Karno-class corvette
    - Teluk Bintuni-class landing ship tank
    - Dorang-class patrol boat
  - OTO Marlin 40 (RC)
    - Belati-class missile boat
- Italy
  - Vittorio Veneto-class cruiser
  - Giuseppe Garibaldi-class aircraft carrier
  - Lupo-class frigate
  - Maestrale-class frigate
- Kuwait
  - DARDO
    - Istiqlal-class missile boat
    - Al Boom-class missile boat
  - Single Fast Forty - Type B
    - Um Al Maradim-class missile boat
- Libya
  - Ibn Ouf-class landing ship tank
  - Beir Grassa-class missile boat
- Malaysia
  - Laksamana-class corvette
- Nigeria
  - DARDO
    - Aradu-class frigate
    - Erinomi-class corvette
    - Siri-class missile boat
    - Ekpe-class missile boat
  - OTO Marlin 40 (RC)
    - OPV 76
- Oman
  - Nasr al Bahr-class amphibious warfare vessel
  - Dhofar-class missile boat
  - Al Bushra-class missile boat
- Peru
  - Almirante Grau-class cruiser
  - Lupo-class frigate
  - Carvajal-class frigate
  - Velarde-class corvette
  - Pohang-class corvette
  - Pisco-class landing platform dock
- Philippines
  - Pohang-class corvette
- Qatar
  - Damsah-class missile boat
- Saudi Arabia
  - Al Madinah-class frigate
  - Boraida-class replenishment oiler
- South Korea
  - Ulsan-class frigate
  - Pohang-class corvette
  - Bukhansan-class patrol boat
- Thailand
  - Makut Rajakumarn-class frigate
  - Ratanakosin-class corvette
  - Chonburi-class patrol boat
- Tunisia
  - La Galite-class missile boat
- Turkey
  - DARDO
    - Kılıç-class missile boat
    - Tuzla-class patrol boat
  - Single Fast Forty - Type B (Stealth)
    - Bayraktar-class landing ship tank
- Turkmenistan
  - Serhet-class patrol boat
- United Arab Emirates
  - Ban Yas-class missile boat
- Venezuela
  - Lupo-class frigate
  - Capana-class landing ship tank
- Vietnam
  - Pohang-class corvette

== See also ==
- Aselsan GOKDENIZ
- Myriad CIWS
- Meroka CIWS
- Sea Zenith CIWS
- Denel 35mm Dual Purpose Gun
