= List of equipment of the Indonesian Navy =

.The Equipment of the Indonesian Navy can be subdivided into: ships, shipboard weapons, aircraft, land vehicles, land artillery, small arms and attire. These also includes the equipment of the Marine Corps, KOPASKA and Denjaka special forces.

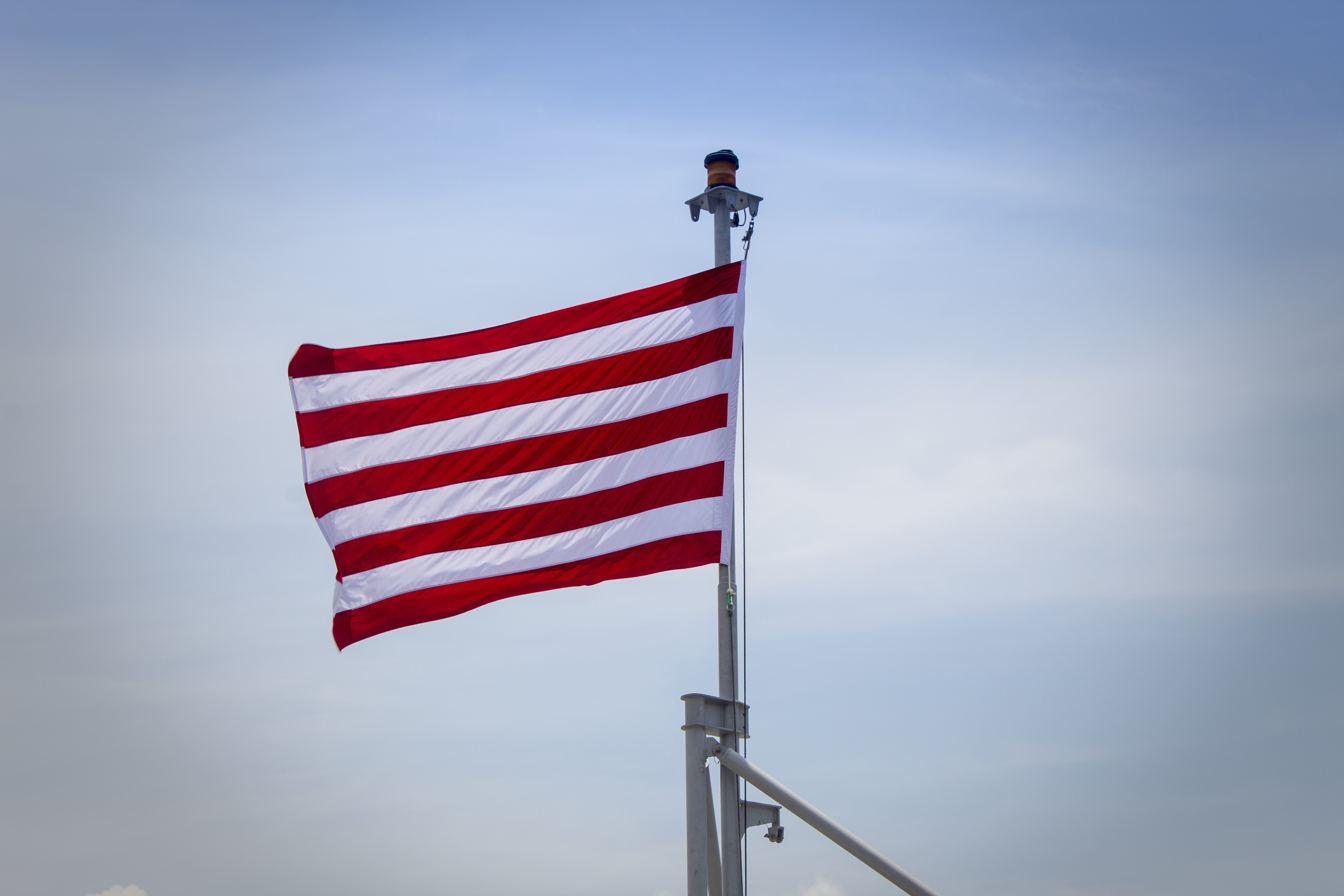
Indonesian Naval Jack onboard KRI Diponegoro (365)

== Ships ==
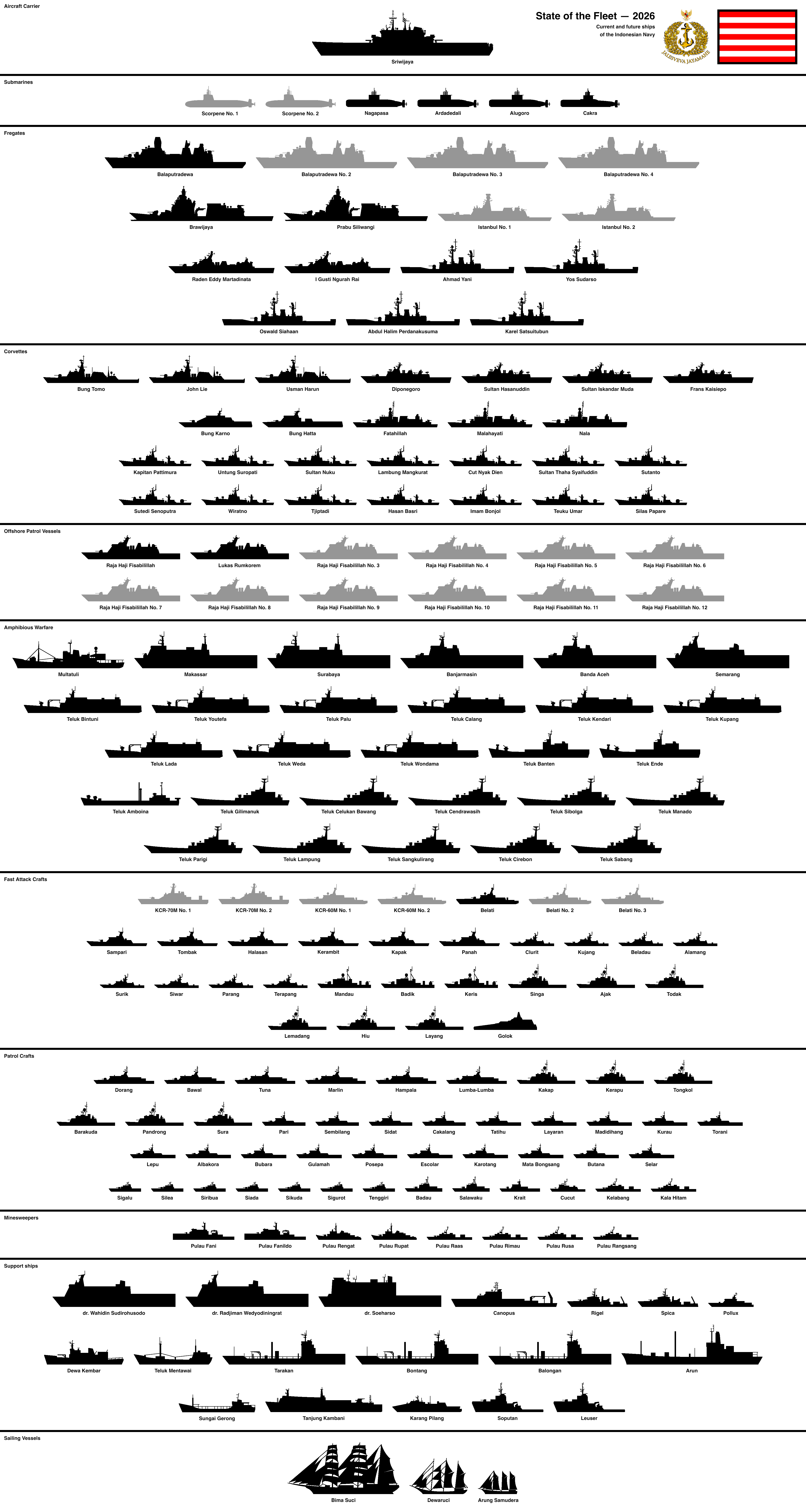

== Aircraft ==
Aircraft	Image	Origin	Type	Variant	Quantity	Notes
Combat aircraft
CASA/IPTN CN-235		Spain; Indonesia	Maritime patrol aircraft Tactical airlifter	CN-235-220 MPA	6	6 unit is MPA version (CN-235 MPA), two existing aircraft ongoing upgrade version with the new features and equipment. 1 transport variant on order.
CASA C-212 Aviocar		Spain; Indonesia	Maritime Patrol & Tactical Transport	NC-212 NC-212 MPA	11	3 unit is MPA version (NC-212 MPA) and installed with domestic made FLIR and Thales Ocean Master radar.
Vulcanair A-VIATOR		Italy	Maritime patrol / Utility / Trainer	AP.68TP-600	0	4 on order
Beechcraft Super King Air		United States	VIP transport	King Air 350i	1	
Beechcraft Baron		United States	Advanced trainer / Light transport	G58 Baron	2	
Beechcraft Bonanza		United States	Trainer / Light transport	G-36 Bonanza	7	1 crashed in Madura Strait
Piper PA-28 Cherokee		United States	Trainer	Piper Archer DX	5	
Rotary-wing aircraft
Eurocopter AS565 Panther		France; Indonesia	ASW / utility helicopter	Dauphin AS565 MBe	11	Will be used for naval anti-submarine warfare (ASW) missions and to support operations from land bases and vessels. Licensed produced by Indonesian Aerospace
Bell 412	Bell 412 Indonesian Navy	Canada; Indonesia	utility helicopter	NBell 412EP	3	Licensed produced by Indonesian Aerospace
MBB Bo 105	Indonesian navy NBO-105	Germany; Indonesia	utility helicopter	NBO-105	8	Licensed produced by Indonesian Aerospace
Bell 505 Jet Ranger X	Bell 505 Indonesian navy	Canada; Indonesia	rotorcraft trainer		4 (+1 on order)	
Unmanned aerial vehicle
Anka		Turkey	MALE; UCAV		--	On order, including local production
Schiebel Camcopter S-100		Austria	Camcopter		--	
Honeycomb Aerospace HC-540		China	Surveillance UAV		--	
Swarmly Poseidon H10		Cyprus	Surveillance UAV		--	
Swarmly Poseidon H12		Cyprus	Surveillance UAV		--	
Boeing Insitu ScanEagle		United States	Surveillance UAV	MQ-27B	--	14 ordered. Some has been received in 2021.
Uavtek Bug Nano		United Kingdom	UAS Quadcopter	FX Nano 1A	--	Used by Marine Corps and Kopaska.

== Land vehicles ==
Model	Image	Origin	Type	Variant	Quantity	Notes
Armoured vehicles
PT-76		Soviet Union	Light tank	PT-76B PT-76(M)	86	Originally about 140 were purchased. Some vehicles have been reconditioned in 2019/2020. PT-76 used by the Indonesian Marines were upgraded by PT Lumindo Artha Sejati in collaboration with Ukrspetsexport. New Detroit Diesel engines, Cockerill Mk III 90mm cannons, new FCS, new day/night sight, a laser range-finder, and turret stabilizer.
AMX-10P		France	Infantry fighting vehicle Light Tank	AMX-10P Marine AMX-10 PAC 90	37	Variants equipped with 90mm, 20mm & 12.7mm calibre weapons
BMP-2		Slovakia	Infantry fighting vehicle	BVP-2	23	Also used as a short range mobile AA.
BMP-3		Russia	Infantry fighting vehicle	BMP-3F	54	100 mm gun/launcher 2A70 (able to fire shells or the 9M117 Bastion ATGM), 30 mm autocannon 2A72. In 2019, Indonesia ordered another 22 units but not materialized due to CAATSA.
BTR-50		Soviet Union	Amphibious armoured personnel carrier	BTR-50PK BTR-50PU BTR-50PM BTR-50P(M)	128	All upgraded with new engine, radio system and smoke grenade launchers on some vehicles. Originally 180 APCs was purchased. Additional 34 BTR-50 was purchased from Ukraine in 1997–1999. Some vehicles have been reconditioned in 2019/2020.
AAV7		United States	Armoured personnel carrier	LVTP-7A1 AAV7A1 RAM/RS	27 (+23)	15 LVTP-7A1 donated by South Korea in 2009. In mid-2026 the Indonesian government approved a government-to-government (G2G) agreement with the United States to acquire approximately 35 units of ex-US Marine Corps (USMC) AAV7A1 amphibious assault vehicles. 12 AAV7A1 delivered in October 2026 with 23 more AAV7A1 on order. The AAV7A1 RAM/RS is locally designated as "AAV M-35".
BTR-4		Ukraine	Armoured personnel carrier	BTR-4M BAU Parus module. BTR-4M RCWS turret	5	Subsequent orders for 55 vehicles were cancelled due to unsatisfactory performance. 2 BTR-4, and 3 BTR-4K.
BTR-80		Russia	Armoured personnel carrier	BTR-80A	12	Previously used by Indobatt Contingent on UNIFIL mission in Lebanon (2009–2025). All 12 BTR-80A returned to Indonesia, and currently used by 1st Marine Cavalry Regiment.
Combat support system
Sinotruk Howo		China	Battery support vehicle	Sinotruk Howo (4x4)	1	Used as platform for AF902 fire control system and search/tracking radar as part of 35 mm Type 90 air defense system
Tatrapan		Slovakia	Battery support vehicle		Unknown	Used as artillery command vehicle for RM-70 MRLS battery
Kerametal Aligator Master 4x4		Slovakia	Battery support vehicle		Unknown	Used as artillery observer vehicle for RM-70 MRLS battery
Utility vehicles
K-61		Soviet Union	Amphibious vehicle	K-61 (PTS)	31	
PTS		Soviet Union	Amphibious vehicle	PTS-10	9	
Land Rover series		United Kingdom	Light utility vehicle	Series II	Unknown	For ceremonial duty
KIA KM420		South Korea	Light utility vehicle		140	
Indonesian Light Strike Vehicle		Indonesia	Military light utility vehicle	ILSV armored APC	Unknown	Used by Kopaska and Marines.
Pindad Maung		Indonesia	Light utility vehicle		Unknown	Used by Marines.
P6 ATAV		Indonesia	Light attack vehicle	Unarmoured	Unknown	Used by Marines.
Engineering vehicles
BREM-Ch		Ukraine	Armoured recovery vehicle	VPV ARV	3	
BREM-L		Russia	Armoured recovery vehicle		1	
MAN KAT1		Germany	Bridging vehicle	MAN KAT1 8×8 LEGUAN MLC70	Unknown	
Ural-4320		Russia	Support vehicle	TRM 80	1	Used as workshop and communication center for BMP-3F
Logistics
ACMAT VLRA		France	Multi-purpose vehicle	ACMAT VLRA 4x4 STL	Unknown	
Unimog		Germany	Multi-purpose vehicle	Unimog U1300L (4x4); Unimog U1550L (4x4)	≤240	
M35 2½-ton cargo truck		United States	Multi-purpose vehicle	M35	Unknown	
Isuzu NPS		Japan	Multi-purpose vehicle	Isuzu NPS 75 (4x4)	175	
Isuzu FVZ		Japan	Multi-purpose vehicle	Isuzu FVZ 34 (6x4)	90	Used as ammunition carrier.
Toyota Hilux		Japan	Multi-purpose vehicle	Hilux 2024 Facelift + M134P minigun	Unknown	Used by the Marine Corps.
LIAZ 200 series		Czech Republic	Multi-purpose vehicle	LIAZ 251.154 RHD 4×4	Unknown	
Tatra 815-7		Czech Republic	Multi-purpose heavy-duty vehicle	T815-7 MOR89 8x8	Unknown	Used as ammunition carrier for RM-70 battery and also used as BMP-3F transporter
Nissan Diesel UD330		Japan	Tank transporter		Unknown	
WS2400		China	Tank transporter		Unknown	

== Land artillery ==
Model	Image	Origin	Type	Variant	Quantity	Notes
Rocket launchers
RM-70		Czechoslovakia	Multiple Rocket Launcher	RM-70 Grad	9	9 RM-70 Grad acquired around 2003.
RM-70		Czech Republic	Multiple Rocket Launcher	RM-70 Vampire	36	8 systems acquired in 2016, 28 additional acquired in 2022-2023.
Type 90B MLRS		China	Multiple Rocket Launcher	Type 90B	4	At least 4 units of Type 90B purchased in 2015
Howitzers
LG1		France	Towed Howitzer	LG1 Mark II	20	
M1938 (M-30)		Soviet Union	Towed Howitzer		75	Originally 75 were acquired from the Soviet Union in 1961 as preparation for Operation Trikora.. The numbers may have dwindled over the years. Acquired from Soviet Union; The system remained in service as June 2020.
Mortars
MO-3		Indonesia	Mortar	81mm mortar	MO-3	
MO-2		Indonesia	Mortar	60mm mortar	MO-2	
Anti-Aircraft Gun
M1939 (52-K)		Soviet Union	85mm Anti-aircraft gun		Unknown	Acquired from the Soviet Union in 1961 as preparation for the Operation Trikora. Still in service as September 2020 for training purpose.
M1939 (61-K)		Soviet Union	37mm Anti-aircraft autocannon		24	Acquired from Soviet Union in 1961 as preparation for Operation Trikora. Still in service as March 2020.
Norinco/Oerlikon GDF		Switzerland; China	35mm Anti-aircraft autocannon	Type 90	4	Operated with a Skyguard fire control radar (AF-902 version)

== Infantry Equipment ==
Model	Image	Origin	Type	Variant	Notes
Combat Helmet
MICH		United States Indonesia	Combat Helmet	MICH TC-2000 MICH TC-2001 MICH TC-2002	Current Standard Issue Helmet replacing PASGT in Service for Combat and Training Duties.
PASGT		United States Indonesia	Combat Helmet		Standard Issue Helmet, Procured RBR from England and then Schuberth B826 from Germany, later will be locally made modeled after the Schuberth B826.
FAST		United States Indonesia	Combat Helmet		Used by KOPASKA, Denjaka and Taifib
CVCH		United States	Crewman Helmet		Current Standard Issue Crewman Helmet for NATO country-made Armored Fighting Vehicle and AAV Crewman
TSh-4		Soviet Union	Crewman Helmet		Current Standard Issue Crewman Helmet for Warsaw Pact country-made Armored Fighting Vehicle Crewman
M1		United States South Korea	Combat Helmet	M1 Bangtan Helmet	Limited use. Training purpose only.
Combat Uniform & Attire
PDL TNI PRIMA _{Indonesian National Armed Forces} _{PRIMA} _{Combat Uniform}		Indonesia	Combat Uniform		"PDL TNI Prima" is the new field uniform featuring a digital camouflage pattern. This new pattern is planned to be adopted simultaneously on Oct 5, 2025, coinciding with the celebration of the National Armed Forces' 80th anniversary.
PDL TNI _{TNI Universal Uniform}		United Kingdom	Combat Uniform	Disruptive Pattern Material	Modified Version of British Disruptive Pattern Material locally known as Pakaian Dinas Lapangan (PDL) Loreng Malvinas. Previously standard issued uniform for Indonesian National Armed Forces Service Members and used in all occasions. Will be replaced with new field uniform featuring a digital camouflage pattern called "sage green digital" (now its called "TNI PRIMA Camo").
PDL TNI AL _{Indonesian Navy Combat Uniform}		Indonesia	Combat Uniform	Loreng Layar or Sailing Camo	Standard issue for Navy since 2011.
PDL Korps Marinir _{Indonesian Marine Corps Combat Uniform}		United States Indonesia	Combat Uniform	Loreng Macan Tutul or Leopard Camo	Used by Marine Corps since 1984, for ceremonial use.
PDL Kopaska _{Indonesian Navy Special Forces Combat Uniform}		Indonesia	Combat Uniform		Standard issue since 2006.
Combat Vest, Bulletproof Vest & Plate Carrier
Combat vest		Indonesia	Bulletproof vest		Standard issue.
Scalable Plate Carrier		United States Indonesia	Plate Carrier		Current standard issue.
ALICE		United States Indonesia	Load-bearing equipment		

== Small arms ==
Model	Origin	Type	Calibre	Variant	Notes
Handguns
Hi-Power	Belgium	Semi-automatic pistol	9×19mm Parabellum	Pindad P1	Standard issue sidearms.
Hi-Power	Belgium; Indonesia	Semi-automatic pistol	9×19mm Parabellum	Pindad P2	Standard issue sidearms.
G2	Indonesia	Semi-automatic pistol	9×19mm Parabellum	G2 Combat G2 Elite	Standard issue sidearms. Gradually replacing the Pindad P1 and the P2 in service.
Glock	Austria	Semi-automatic pistol	9×19mm Parabellum	Glock 17	Used by the Kopaska.
Glock	Austria	Semi-automatic pistol	9×19mm Parabellum	Glock 19	Used by the Kopaska.
Glock	Austria	Semi-automatic pistol	9×19mm Parabellum	Glock 26	Used by the Kopaska.
Beretta APX	Italy	Semi-automatic pistol	9×19mm Parabellum	APX A0	Used by the Taifib, the Kopaska, the Denjaka, and the Denintel Koarmada (Fleet Command Intelligence Detachment).
P7	Germany	Semi-automatic pistol	9×19mm Parabellum	P7M8	Used by the Marine Corps.
P30	Germany	Semi-automatic pistol	9×19mm Parabellum	P30L	Used by the Denjaka.
Beretta 92	Italy	Semi-automatic pistol	9×19mm Parabellum	92F	Used by the Kopaska.
P226	Switzerland	Semi-automatic pistol	9×19mm Parabellum	P226 P228	Used by the Kopaska and high-ranking officer.
BUL Cherokee	Israel	Semi-automatic pistol	9×19mm Parabellum	Cherokee Compact	Used by the Kopaska.
Tanfoglio	Italy	Semi-automatic pistol	9×19mm Parabellum	Limited Custom	For training and sport competition only.
Tanfoglio	Italy	Semi-automatic pistol	9×19mm Parabellum	Limited Xtreme	For training and sport competition only.
Beretta Nano	United States	Semi-automatic pistol	9×19mm Parabellum	BU 9	In limited service (after the production of Beretta Nano discontinued in 2019).
Mark 23	Germany	Semi-automatic pistol	.45 ACP	–	Used by Kopaska.
Five-seven	Belgium	Semi-automatic pistol	FN 5.7×28mm NATO	–	Used by Kopaska.
Walther PP	Germany	Semi-automatic pistol	7.65x17mm	PPK	Used by Kopaska and Marine Corps.
Police Positive Special	United States	Revolver	.38 Special	–	In limited service.
Submachine guns
B&T MP9	Switzerland	Submachine guns	9×19mm Parabellum	–	Used by the Kopaska, the Denjaka, and the Taifib.
CMMG Banshee	United States	Submachine guns	9×19mm Parabellum	Mk4	Used by the Kopaska.
CZ Scorpion EVO 3	Czech Republic	Submachine guns	9×19mm Parabellum	–	Used by the Kopaska.
Daewoo K7	South Korea	Submachine guns	9×19mm Parabellum	–	Used by the Kopaska.
HK MP5	Germany	Submachine guns	9×19mm Parabellum	MP5A3	Used by the Kopaska.
HK MP5	Germany	Submachine guns	9×19mm Parabellum	MP5SD3	Used by the Kopaska.
Pindad PM3	Indonesia	Submachine guns	9×19mm Parabellum	–	95 PM3s used by the Indonesian Marine Corps.
SIG MPX	United States	Submachine guns	9×19mm Parabellum	–	Used by the Denjaka.
Uzi	Israel	Submachine guns	9×19mm Parabellum	SMG - wooden stock	Used by the Taifib and the Kopaska.
Uzi	Israel	Submachine guns	9×19mm Parabellum	SMG - folding stock	Used by the Taifib and the Kopaska.
FN P90	Belgium	Submachine guns	FN 5.7×28mm NATO	–	Used by the Kopaska.
Škorpion	Czechoslovakia	Submachine guns	.32 ACP	vz. 61	Limited service. Used by the Kopaska.
Assault rifles / Carbines
Pindad SS1	Indonesia	Assault rifle	5.56×45mm NATO	SS1-V1	Standard issue assault rifle. The SS1-M1 variants are intended for the Indonesian Marine Corps. A special coating process ensures the SS1 M series to be able to hold up sea water and not rust easily. The variant is designed to function even after being drenched in mud or sand. Available in 3 variants: SS1-M1, with a long barrel and foldable butt; SS1-M2, with a short barrel and foldable butt and SS1-M5 Commando. All remaining SS1 in service are to be replaced by the newer SS2.
Pindad SS1	Indonesia	Assault rifle	5.56×45mm NATO	SS1-V2	Standard issue assault rifle. The SS1-M1 variants are intended for the Indonesian Marine Corps. A special coating process ensures the SS1 M series to be able to hold up sea water and not rust easily. The variant is designed to function even after being drenched in mud or sand. Available in 3 variants: SS1-M1, with a long barrel and foldable butt; SS1-M2, with a short barrel and foldable butt and SS1-M5 Commando. All remaining SS1 in service are to be replaced by the newer SS2.
Pindad SS1	Indonesia	Assault rifle	5.56×45mm NATO	SS1-V3	Standard issue assault rifle. The SS1-M1 variants are intended for the Indonesian Marine Corps. A special coating process ensures the SS1 M series to be able to hold up sea water and not rust easily. The variant is designed to function even after being drenched in mud or sand. Available in 3 variants: SS1-M1, with a long barrel and foldable butt; SS1-M2, with a short barrel and foldable butt and SS1-M5 Commando. All remaining SS1 in service are to be replaced by the newer SS2.
Pindad SS1	Indonesia	Assault rifle	5.56×45mm NATO	SS1-V4	Standard issue assault rifle. The SS1-M1 variants are intended for the Indonesian Marine Corps. A special coating process ensures the SS1 M series to be able to hold up sea water and not rust easily. The variant is designed to function even after being drenched in mud or sand. Available in 3 variants: SS1-M1, with a long barrel and foldable butt; SS1-M2, with a short barrel and foldable butt and SS1-M5 Commando. All remaining SS1 in service are to be replaced by the newer SS2.
Pindad SS1	Indonesia	Assault rifle	5.56×45mm NATO	SS1-M1	Standard issue assault rifle. The SS1-M1 variants are intended for the Indonesian Marine Corps. A special coating process ensures the SS1 M series to be able to hold up sea water and not rust easily. The variant is designed to function even after being drenched in mud or sand. Available in 3 variants: SS1-M1, with a long barrel and foldable butt; SS1-M2, with a short barrel and foldable butt and SS1-M5 Commando. All remaining SS1 in service are to be replaced by the newer SS2.
Pindad SS1	Indonesia	Assault rifle	5.56×45mm NATO	SS1-M2	Standard issue assault rifle. The SS1-M1 variants are intended for the Indonesian Marine Corps. A special coating process ensures the SS1 M series to be able to hold up sea water and not rust easily. The variant is designed to function even after being drenched in mud or sand. Available in 3 variants: SS1-M1, with a long barrel and foldable butt; SS1-M2, with a short barrel and foldable butt and SS1-M5 Commando. All remaining SS1 in service are to be replaced by the newer SS2.
Pindad SS1	Indonesia	Assault rifle	5.56×45mm NATO	SS1-M5 Commando	Standard issue assault rifle. The SS1-M1 variants are intended for the Indonesian Marine Corps. A special coating process ensures the SS1 M series to be able to hold up sea water and not rust easily. The variant is designed to function even after being drenched in mud or sand. Available in 3 variants: SS1-M1, with a long barrel and foldable butt; SS1-M2, with a short barrel and foldable butt and SS1-M5 Commando. All remaining SS1 in service are to be replaced by the newer SS2.
Pindad SS2	Indonesia	Assault rifle	5.56×45mm NATO	SS2-V1	New standard issue assault rifle, gradually replacing SS1. The SS2-V4 variants are used by the Kopaska and the Taifib.
Pindad SS2	Indonesia	Assault rifle	5.56×45mm NATO	SS2-V2	New standard issue assault rifle, gradually replacing SS1. The SS2-V4 variants are used by the Kopaska and the Taifib.
Pindad SS2	Indonesia	Assault rifle	5.56×45mm NATO	SS2-V4	New standard issue assault rifle, gradually replacing SS1. The SS2-V4 variants are used by the Kopaska and the Taifib.
CAR 816	United Arab Emirates; Indonesia	Assault rifle	5.56×45mm NATO	PC 816 V1	Used by the Marine Corps.
CZ 805 Bren	Czech Republic	Assault rifle	5.56×45mm NATO	CZ 805 BREN A1	Used by Kopaska and Taifib.
CZ 805 Bren	Czech Republic	Assault rifle	5.56×45mm NATO	CZ BREN 2	
CZ 805 Bren	Czech Republic	Assault rifle	5.56×45mm NATO	CZ 807	
Dasan DSAR-15	South Korea	Carbine	5.56×45mm NATO	DSAR-15P	Used by the Kopaska and the Denjaka.
Heckler & Koch HK33	Germany	Assault rifle	5.56×45mm NATO	HK53	Used by the Kopaska.
Heckler & Koch G36	Germany	Assault rifle	5.56×45mm NATO	G36C	Used by the Kopaska and the Denjaka.
Heckler & Koch G36	Germany	Assault rifle	5.56×45mm NATO	G36V	Used by the Kopaska and the Denjaka.
Heckler & Koch HK416	Germany	Assault rifle	5.56×45mm NATO	HK416	Used by the Denjaka, the Kopaska, and the Taifib.
Heckler & Koch HK416	Germany	Assault rifle	5.56×45mm NATO	HK416 A5	Used by the Denjaka, the Kopaska, and the Taifib.
IWI Galil	Israel	Assault rifle	5.56×45mm NATO	Galil ARM	Used by the Kopaska.
Komodo Armament D5	Indonesia	Assault rifle	5.56×45mm NATO	–	Used by the Kodiklatal (Naval Doctrine, Education, and Training Development Command).
M4	United States	Carbine	5.56×45mm NATO	M4A1	Used by the Kopaska, the Taifib and the Denjaka.
M16	United States	Assault rifle	5.56×45mm NATO	M16A1	M16A1 in limited service.
SIG 516	United States	Assault rifle	5.56×45mm NATO	–	Used by the Denjaka.
SOAR	United States	Assault rifle	5.56×45mm NATO	IAR	Used by the Taifib.
SIG 550	Switzerland	Assault rifle	5.56×45mm NATO	SG 550	SG 550 and 552 are used by the Kopaska,
SIG 550	Switzerland	Carbine	5.56×45mm NATO	SG 552	SG 550 and 552 are used by the Kopaska,
Steyr AUG	Austria	Assault rifle	5.56×45mm NATO	AUG A1	Used by the Kopaska.
Steyr AUG	Austria	Assault rifle	5.56×45mm NATO	AUG A2	Used by the Kopaska.
Steyr AUG	Austria	Assault rifle	5.56×45mm NATO	AUG A3	Used by the Kopaska.
UkrOboronProm UX-15	Ukraine	Assault rifle	5.56×45mm NATO	–	Used by the Kopaska.
AKM	Soviet Union; Czech Republic	Assault rifle	5.56×45mm NATO	AKM-103	Used by the Marine Corps.
AK-101	Russia	Assault rifle	5.56×45mm NATO	–	Used by the Marine Corps.
APS	Russia	Underwater Assault rifle	5.66×39mm	–	Used by the Kopaska.
AK-47	Soviet Union	Assault rifle	7.62×39mm	Type 2	Limited service. Currently only used for training and reserves purposes only.
SKS	Soviet Union	Semi-automatic carbine	7.62×39mm	–	Used for training and ceremonial purposes.
Type 56	China	Assault rifle	7.62×39mm	–	Currently only used for training and reserves purposes only.
Vz. 58	Czechoslovakia	Assault rifle	7.62×39mm	Vz. 58 V	Used by the Kopaska.
Battle rifles
FN FAL	Belgium	Battle rifle	7.62×51mm NATO	–	Used aboard naval vessels for line throwers.
Machine guns
FN Minimi	Belgium; Indonesia	Light machine gun	5.56×45mm NATO	Pindad SM3	Standard issued light machine gun. Locally produced as the Pindad SM3.
M60	United States	General-purpose machine gun	7.62×51mm NATO	M60E6	Standard issued.
FN MAG	Belgium; Indonesia	General-purpose machine gun	7.62×51mm NATO	Pindad SM2-V1	Standard issued. Also used by KOPASKA.
FN MAG	Belgium; Indonesia	General-purpose machine gun	7.62×51mm NATO	Pindad SM2-V2	Used by the Kopaska. Locally produced by Pindad.
Daewoo K3	South Korea	Light machine gun	5.56×45mm NATO	–	Used by the Kopaska and the Marine Corps.
Ultimax 100	Singapore	Light machine gun	5.56×45mm NATO	Mark 1	Used by the Taifib.
Ultimax 100	Singapore	Light machine gun	5.56×45mm NATO	Mark 2	Used by the Taifib.
RPD	Soviet Union	Light machine gun	7.62×39mm	–	
M1918 BAR	United States; Belgium	Light machine gun	.30-06 Springfield	FN Model D	Belgian made M1918, In limited service.
M1919	United States	General-purpose machine gun	.30-06 Springfield	–	
Heckler & Koch MG5	Germany	General-purpose machine gun	7.62×51mm NATO	–	Used by the Kopaska and the Taifib.
AA-52	France	Coaxial machine gun	7.62×51mm NATO	AAT-F1	Used on the AMX-10P PAC 90 IFV.
M134	United States	Gatling-type machine gun	7.62×51mm NATO	M134D	Used on vessels of the Navy, helicopters of the Naval Aviation (Bell 412), on boats and vehicles by the Marine Corps.
M134	United States	Gatling-type machine gun	7.62×51mm NATO	M134P	
PKT	Soviet Union; Serbia	Coaxial machine gun	7.62×54mmR	–	Serbian made PKT. Used on BVP-2 and on Ukrainian made BTR-50PK.
SG-43 Goryunov	Soviet Union	Medium machine gun	7.62×54mmR	SGM	
M2 Browning	United States; Indonesia	Heavy machine gun	12.7×99mm NATO	Pindad SMB-2	
M2 Browning	United States; Indonesia	Heavy machine gun	12.7×99mm NATO	M2HB	
M85	United States	Heavy machine gun	12.7×99mm NATO	–	Weapon mounted on LVTP-7A1.
NSV	Soviet Union	Heavy machine gun	12.7×108mm	–	Used on some ship, fitted with spade grip.
DShK	Soviet Union	Heavy machine gun	12.7×108mm	DShKM	Some used on ships.
Shotguns
Benelli M3	Italy	Pump action shotgun	12 gauge	M3T	Used by the Kopaska.
Franchi SPAS-12	Italy	Pump action shotgun	12 gauge	–	Used by the Kopaska.
Heckler & Koch HK512	Germany; Italy	Pump action shotgun	12 gauge	–	Used by the Denjaka.
Precision rifles
Pindad SPR	Indonesia	Bolt action, designated marksman rifle	7.62×51mm NATO	SPR-3	Standard issued DMR rifle.
Pindad SPR	Indonesia	Anti materiel sniper rifle	12.7×99mm NATO	SPR-2	Standard issued anti-material rifle.
SIG 550	Switzerland	Designated marksman rifle	5.56×45mm NATO	SG 550-1 Sniper	SG 550-1 is used by Marine Corps as DMR.
Heckler & Koch HK417	Germany	Designated marksman rifle	7.62×51mm NATO	G28	Used by the Denjaka and the Taifib.
Heckler & Koch PSG1	Germany	Designated marksman rifle	7.62×51mm NATO	MSG90	Used by the Kopaska and the Denjaka.
IWI Galil	Israel	Designated marksman rifle	7.62×51mm NATO	Galil Sniper	Used by the Kopaska.
M24 SWS	United States	Bolt action sniper rifle	7.62×51mm NATO	M24A2	Used by the Kopaska.
M24 SWS	United States	Bolt action sniper rifle	7.62×51mm NATO	M24A3	Used by the Kopaska.
Steyr SSG 69	Austria	Bolt action sniper rifle	7.62×51mm NATO	–	Used by the Kopaska.
Steyr SSG 04	Austria	Bolt action sniper rifle	7.62×51mm NATO	SSG 04 A1	Used by the Marine Corps.
Accuracy International Arctic Warfare	United Kingdom	Bolt action sniper rifle	7.62×51mm NATO	L96A1	Used by Indonesian Marine Corps.
Accuracy International Arctic Warfare	United Kingdom	Bolt action sniper rifle	7.62×51mm NATO	AW	
Accuracy International Arctic Warfare	United Kingdom	Bolt action sniper rifle	7.62×51mm NATO	AX308	
Accuracy International AWM	United Kingdom	Bolt action sniper rifle	7.62×67mmB	AWM (.300 Win)	Used by the Kopaska.
Accuracy International AWM	United Kingdom	Bolt action sniper rifle	8.6×70mm	AWM (.338 LM)	Used by the Kopaska.
Barrett MRAD	United States	Multi-calibre bolt action sniper rifle	7.62×51mm NATO / 7.62×67mmB / 8.6×70mm	Mk 22	Used by the Marine Corps Amphibious Reconnaissance Battalion.
Sako TRG	Finland	Multi-calibre bolt action sniper rifle	7.62×51mm NATO / 7.62×67mmB / 8.6×70mm	TRG M10	Used by the Marine Corps Amphibious Reconnaissance Battalion.
RPA Rangemaster	United Kingdom	Bolt action sniper rifle	7.62×51mm NATO	Rangemaster 7.62	Used by the Seaman (Sea-fleet) Corps the Marine Corps Amphibious Reconnaissance Battalion.
RPA Rangemaster	United Kingdom	Bolt action sniper rifle	8.6×70mm	Rangemaster 338	Used by the Seaman (Sea-fleet) Corps the Marine Corps Amphibious Reconnaissance Battalion.
Barrett M82	United States		12.7×99mm NATO	M82A1	Used by the Marine Corps Amphibious Reconnaissance Battalion.
Zastava M93	Serbia	Anti-materiel rifle	12.7×99mm NATO	–	Used by the Kopaska and the Marine Corps Amphibious Reconnaissance Battalion.
Truvelo CMS	South Africa	Anti-materiel rifle	12.7×99mm NATO	–	Used by Marine Corps.
Denel NTW-20	South Africa	Anti-materiel rifle	20×82mm	–	Used by the Marine Corps Amphibious Reconnaissance Battalion.
Training weapons
FN Model 1949	Belgium	Semi-automatic battle rifle	.30-06 Springfield	–	Used for training purpose.
Pindad SPR	Indonesia	Bolt action sniper rifle	7.62×51mm NATO	SPR-1	Currently reserved for training purposes. Previously standard issued before being replaced by SPR-3.
Mosin–Nagant	Soviet Union	Bolt action sniper rifle	7.62×54mmR	M91/30	Used by the Marine Corps for training.
Protocol service weapons
M1 Garand	United States	Semi-automatic ceremonial rifle	.30-06 Springfield	–	Used for training and ceremonial purpose.
Grenades and grenade launchers
M203	United States; Indonesia	Under barrel grenade launcher		M203A1	Used by Marine Corps. Fitted on M16 and SS1 & SS2 rifles. Locally produced as the Pindad SPG-1.
M203	United States; Indonesia	Under barrel grenade launcher		M203A2	Used by Marine Corps. Fitted on M16 and SS1 & SS2 rifles. Locally produced as the Pindad SPG-1.
M203	United States; Indonesia	Under barrel grenade launcher		Pindad SPG-1	Used by Marine Corps. Fitted on M16 and SS1 & SS2 rifles. Locally produced as the Pindad SPG-1.
M203	United States; Indonesia	Under barrel grenade launcher		Pindad SPG-1A	Used by Marine Corps. Fitted on M16 and SS1 & SS2 rifles. Locally produced as the Pindad SPG-1.
Heckler & Koch AG36	Germany	Under barrel grenade launcher	40×46mm LV	–	Fitted on HK G36 used by the Denjaka.
Milkor MGL	South Africa	Semi-automatic grenade launcher	40×46mm grenade	M32 MGL	Used by the Kopaska and the Marine Corps.
STK 40 AGL	Singapore; Indonesia	Automatic grenade launcher	40×53mm HV	Pindad SPG-3	Standard issued automatic grenade launcher. Made under license by PT Pindad for the Indonesian military as Pindad SPG-3 in 1994.
GP-25	Soviet Union	Grenade launcher pistol	40mm VOG-25	GP-25	Used by the Taifib.
Anti-tank weapons
RPG-7	Soviet Union; Bulgaria	RPG / RPG launcher	40mm HEAT	ATGL-L	Used by the Marine Corps. Saw in service during the Insurgency in Aceh. Bulgarian-made ATGL-L.
Armbrust	Germany	Recoilless gun	67mm	Armbrust AT	Used by the Kopaska.
9M113 Konkurs	Soviet Union	Anti-tank guided missile	135mm	–	Mounted on Slovak made BMP-2.
MANPADS
9K32 Strela-2	Soviet Union	MANPADS	72mm	–	Mounted on several warships and used by the Marine Corps.

== See also ==
- List of equipment of the Indonesian Army
- List of equipment of the Indonesian Air Force
- List of equipment of the Indonesian National Police
- List of aircraft of the Indonesian National Armed Forces
