= Indonesian Special Forces =

Special Forces units in Indonesia are composed from the Indonesian Armed Forces which consist of the following units:

- Joint units
  - Koopssus, special forces unit of the Indonesian National Armed Forces with counter-terrorism duties.
- Indonesian Army
  - Kopassus, special forces and Army counter-terrorist unit.
  - Tontaipur (Peleton Intai Tempur - Combat Reconnaissance Platoon), platoon-sized special reconnaissance unit under Army Strategic Reserve Command.
- Indonesian Navy
  - Kopaska, commando frogman unit.
  - Taifib, reconnaissance-commando unit, under command of the Marine Corps
  - Denjaka, special operations and maritime counter-terrorism forces.
- Indonesian Air Force
  - Korpasgat, special operations unit, particularly used in the role of airfield security, seizure, control, air defense, combat control, and combat search and rescue, also counter-terrorism.
  - Bravo Detachment 90 is a counter-terrorism unit whose personnel are specialists recruited and chosen from the Indonesian Air Force's Kopasgat.
