= Dasan Machineries DSAR-15 =

Assault rifle

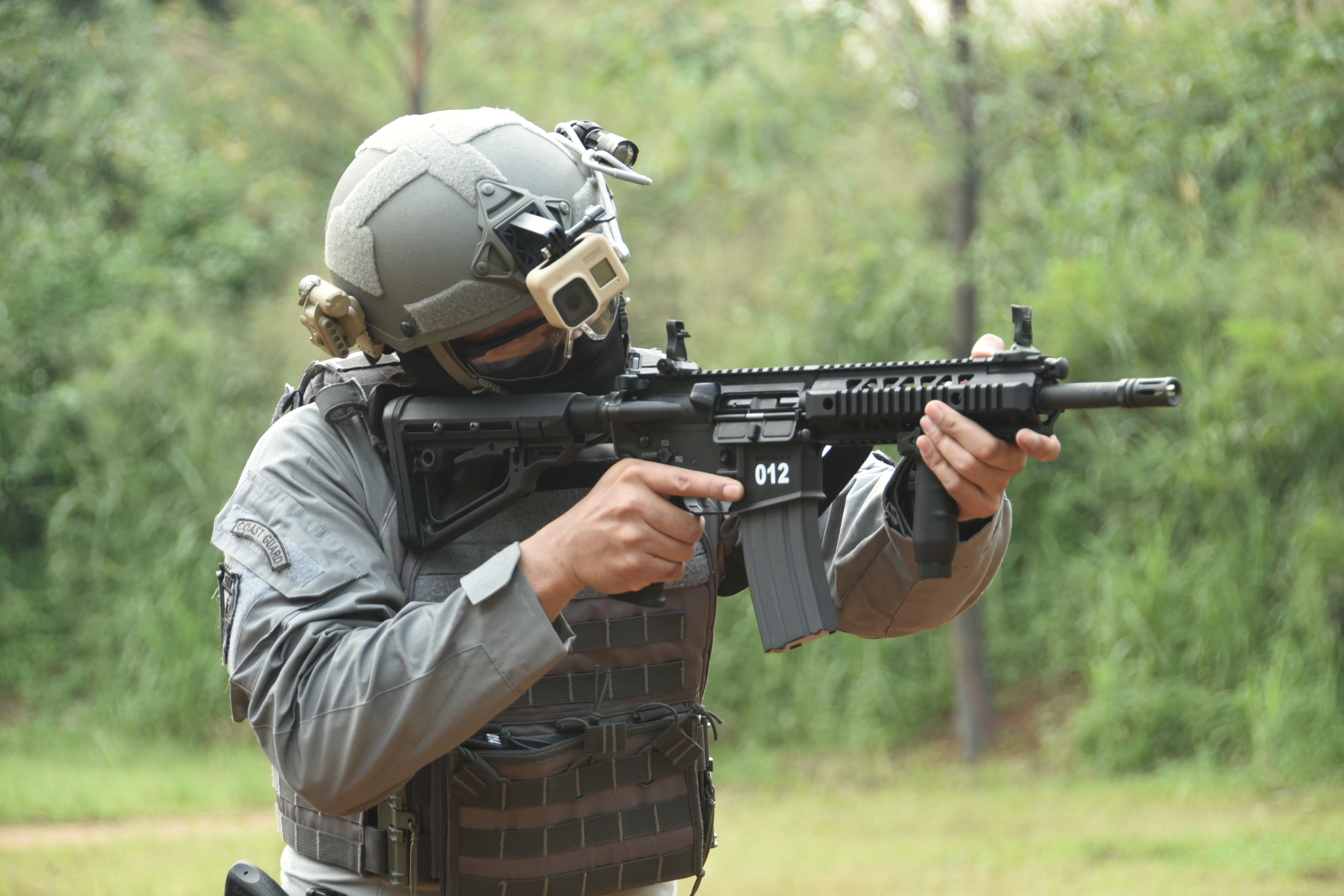
- Indonesian Maritime Security Agency SRT operator firing the DSAR15P
- Type: Assault rifle Carbine
- Place of origin: Republic of Korea

Production history
- Designer: Dasan Machineries
- Designed: 2020-present
- Manufacturer: Dasan Machineries
- Produced: 2021-present

Specifications
- Mass: 3.0 kg (6.6 lb) (DSAR15PC, w/o magazine)
- Length: 760 mm (30 in) (DSAR15PC, extended)
- Barrel length: 292 mm (11.5 in) (DSAR15PC)
- Cartridge: 5.56×45mm NATO
- Action: direct gas impingement (DSAR-15); short-stroke gas piston (DSAR-15P, DSAR-15PC)
- Rate of fire: 700-950 rounds/min
- Effective firing range: 550 m
- Feed system: STANAG Magazine

The Dasan Machineries DSAR-15 is a 5.56×45mm NATO selective fire AR-15–style assault rifle manufactured by Dasan Machineries.

== History ==
To replace the outdated K1A in service, the Republic of Korea Armed Forces initiated two submachine gun acquisition programs:

1. Special Operations Submachine Gun Type-I, first announced in 2016, which focuses on developing new weapon systems intended for large-scale deployment to across all branches of Republic of Korea Armed Forces.
2. Special Operations Submachine Gun Type-II, first announced in 2019, which focuses on acquiring already-developed weapons in smaller quantities to meet immediate operational demand, primarily from Republic of Korea Army Special Warfare Command.

For the Type-I program (provisionally named K16 at the time by the media, though this designation was later officially assigned to the S&T Motiv K16 general-purpose machine gun chambered in 7.62×51mm NATO), there would be three years of development and one year of feasibility study between 2020 and 2024, with mass production scheduled to commence by 2024.

On 23 June 2020, the DSAR-15PC - a variant of the DSAR-15 modified with a short-stroke gas piston operating system and designed for close-quarters battle - was chosen as the base model for the Type-I program. This decision followed a competition against the S&T Motiv STC-16.

According to an unnamed South Korean military official, special forces personnel from the 707th Special Mission Group and the 13th Special Mission Brigade were to receive 1,000 DSAR-15PCs. 15,000 DSAR-15PCs with modifications based on feedback would be delivered by 2023.

However, the DSAR-15PC was canceled in June 2021 due to allegations that a former executive of the manufacturer had leaked military secrets. This setback forced the program to start over and select alternative firearms. There are allegations that the cancellation was politically motivated.

The Type-I program eventually restarted in 2023. Despite facing penalties, Dasan Machineries, initially a preferred bidder, is expected to bid for the program with the new DSAR-15PQ model, which feature a quick-release barrel.

Meanwhile, in the Type-II program, the S&T Motiv STC-16 was selected and designated as K13 in October 2023. An initial batch of 1,710 was ordered, while an improved version will be offered to compete against the Dasan DSAR-15 offering for the reinitiated Type-I project to deliver another 16,000 carbines.

== Variants ==
=== DSAR-15 ===
AR-15 type assault rifle chambered in 5.56×45mm NATO and operates via direct gas impingement.

=== DSAR-15P ===
Modified DSAR-15 featuring a short-stroke piston action derived from the HK416 and CAR 816.

3 different barrel length available: 11.5 in (CQB), 14.5 in (carbine), and 16 in (rifle).

==== DSAR-15PC ====
Modified DSAR-15P CQB.

Initially selected by the ROK Armed Forces to replace the K1A SMG, but the project was later cancelled.

==== DSAR-15PQ ====
Modified DSAR-15PC with a quick-release barrel.

== Users ==
- Bangladesh: The Special Warfare Diving and Salvage (SWADS) members of the Bangladesh Navy use DSAR15P variant.
- Indonesia: The Special Response Team of the Indonesian Maritime Security Agency used DSAR15P variant. The variant is also used by special forces of the Armed Forces, such as Presidential Security Force, Koopssus, Denjaka, Kopaska, Bravo Detachment 90, and Armed Forces General HQ Detachment.
- South Korea: 1,000 DSAR-15PC selected to be fielded to the 707th Special Mission Group and the 13th Special Mission Brigade of the ROKASWC prior to mass production stage to gain feedback. 16,300 were planned produced in 2024, but the proposed acquisition was cancelled in June 2021.
- Philippines: Philippine National Police received 5,755 DSAR-15s in 2023. In January 2026, Dasan received contract to supply DSAR-15s to Philippine Army.
