= Combat Reconnaissance Platoon =

- Peleton Intai Tempur
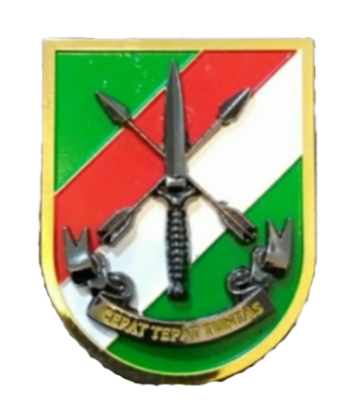
- Insignia of the Tontaipur
- Active: 8 August 2001–present
- Country: Indonesia
- Allegiance: Republic of Indonesia
- Branch: Indonesian Army
- Type: Special forces
- Role: Special reconnaissance
- Size: Classified
- Part of: Army Strategic Command
- Garrison/HQ: Lenteng Agung, South Jakarta
- Nickname(s): Tontaipur
- Motto(s): Cepat, Tepat, Tuntas (Swift, Precise, Accomplished)
- Engagements: Insurgency in Aceh; Papuan conflict; MV Sinar Kudus hijacking; Operation Madago Raya

The Combat Reconnaissance Platoon (Indonesian: Peleton Intai Tempur, abbreviated as Tontaipur) is an elite special unit formation of the Indonesian Army in a platoon level to conduct special reconnaissance (SR) operations. Its members are recruited from the Indonesian Army's elite Army Strategic Reserve Command (Kostrad). Tontaipur is part of the Kostrad Intelligence Battalion and members report directly to the Kostrad commander. Formed on 8 August 2001 by then-Kostrad commander (later Army Chief of Staff and Minister of Defence) Ryamizard Ryacudu, the unit has been deployed in several conflicts in the Indonesian archipelago, ranging from separatist conflicts in Aceh and Papua, to counter-terrorism in Poso. Members of the Tontaipur are generally trained in reconnaissance and close combat. Aside from that, Tontaipur members are also trained for land, air and sea combat special operation, similar to other special units within the Indonesian National Armed Forces. The unit's main duties are to infiltrate enemy territory, gathering intelligence, carrying out sabotage, launching ambushes, etc.

The unit has conducted joint-training with Kopassus, another Indonesian Army special force unit, as well other special force units belonging to other branches of the Indonesian military such as Kopaska of the Indonesian Navy and Paskhas of the Indonesian Air Force.

== History ==
In the early 2000s, during the peak of the war in Aceh, the Indonesian military was bogged down in the war against Acehnese separatists in Aceh, partly due to the rugged and difficult Acehnese terrain. To counter this issue, then-Kostrad commander Lieutenant General Ryamizard Ryacudu came out an idea of forming a small but elite army detachment that can be deployed in harsh terrains, with combat skills as well as special weapons and equipment, such as close-circuit combat diving equipment, underwater vehicles and various other types of advanced weapons, in order to carry out combat operations with optimal results. Tontaipur was formed on 8 August 2001 and was immediately deployed to Aceh in the counter-insurgency effort against the Acehnese separatists. The platoon was engaged in several battles throughout the war in Aceh and remained there until 2005 when the Acehnese leaderships signed a peace agreement with the Indonesian government.

The unit was initially called the Security Intelligence Platoon (Pleton Intai Keamanan, Tontaikam), which was then renamed to its present name in 2005. Following the conclusion of the war in Aceh, Tontaipur members are sent to Papua and Poso to combat Papuan separatists and Islamic terrorists respectively, where they still are deployed as of 2021. The unit also saw actions during the MV Sinar Kudus hijacking in 2011, in which the unit cooperated with the Indonesian Navy's Kopaska unit to rescue hostages from Somali pirates.

To this date, there are 8 waves of training that have been conducted since the unit's formation in 2001, which were attended by officers, non-commissioned officers and enlisted personnel.

== Recruitment and training ==
Members of the Tointaipur are selected from the best soldiers of Kostrad following a long qualification process. They first attended a three months basic training course, in which the best would continue attending a four-month Raider qualifiers training, and finally a six-month special training for Tontaipur members. During the training, members will learn about reconnaissance and the art of combat in the air, water, and land, with instructors coming from other branches of the Indonesian military. Tontaipur members are equipped with combat training in underwater warfare, close-range and urban warfare. They are generally are trained master combat intelligence techniques and are able to penetrate enemy defenses silently and effectively. Tontaipur members are also equipped with bomb disposals training and are also provided with K-9 units for intelligence gathering purposes. Members are also trained to conduct long-range reconnaissance patrolling including pathfinder and Special reconnaissance operations.

As with other Indonesian special forces units, members of the Tontaipur are generally equipped with special equipments that cannot be found on common infantry units, such as sniper rifles, night vision googles, etc. One unique weaponry of the Tontaipur is the blowgun, which originated from the Dayak people in Kalimantan. The use of blowguns by the Dayak people dates back to the colonial period. At that time the blowgun was a reliable weapon for close combat for the Dayaks. The advantage of the blowgun is that it is a silent killer weapon as it does not sound when being fired. The blowgun fires a deadly needle whose poison is obtained from the sap of special trees or from snake venom. This technique is still included in the Tontaipur's training curriculum to this day. The use of the blowgun is very supportive in close-range silent operations. The needles fired from the blowgun can penetrate the target within a distance of 20–50 meters. Although rarely used, the blowgun technique is still used as a special weapon for the Tontaipur.
