= SIG MPX =

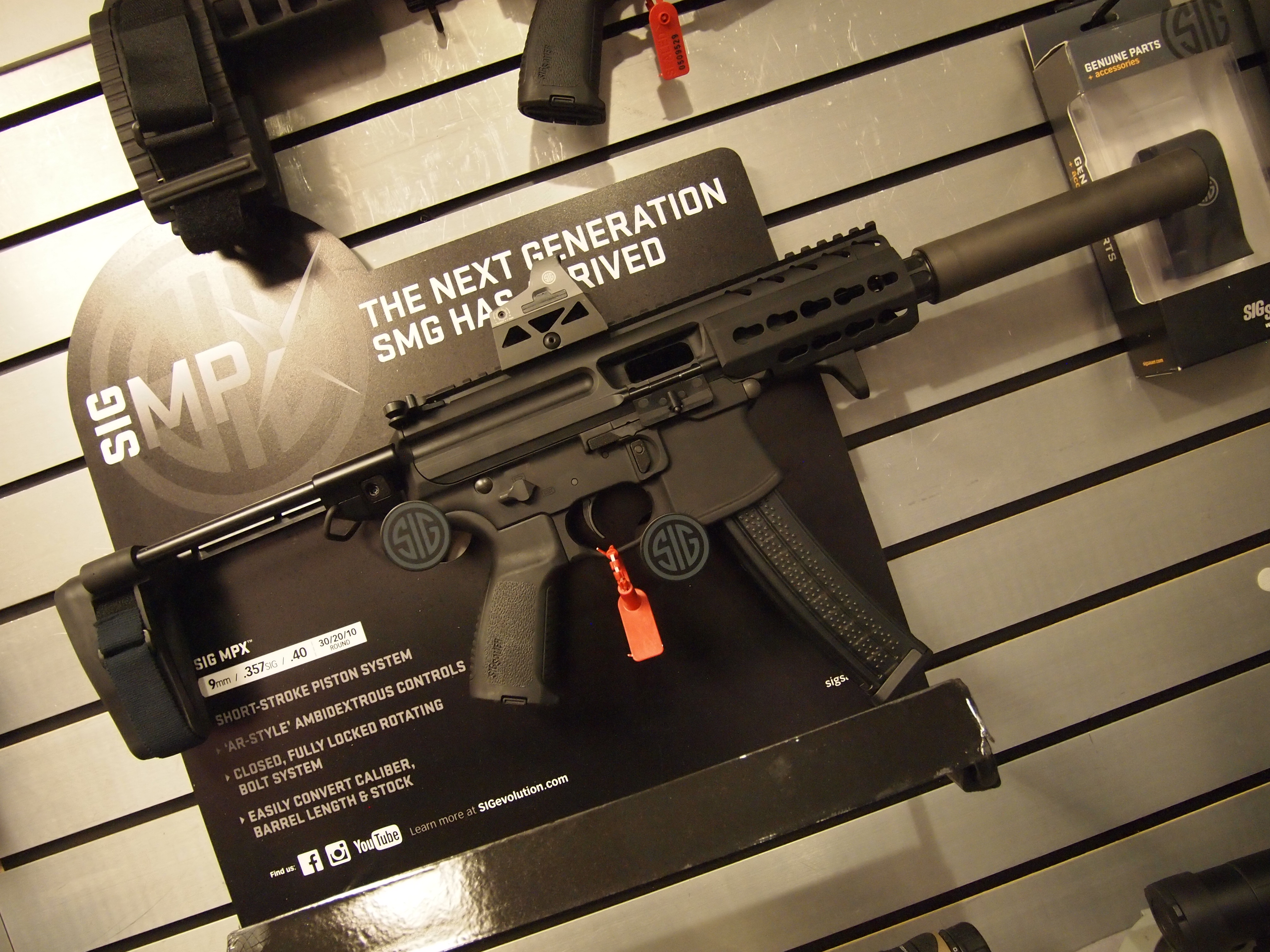
- SIG MPX-K variant with a silencer and SIG red dot sight
- Type: Submachine gun
- Place of origin: United States

Service history
- In service: 2015–present

Production history
- Designed: 2013
- Manufacturer: SIG Sauer
- Produced: 2015–present
- Variants: See Variants

Specifications
- Mass: 2.7 kg (6.1 lbs)
- Length: 425 mm (16.7 in), stock folded 610 mm (24.0 in), stock extended
- Barrel length: 114 mm (4.5 in); 165 mm (6.5 in); 203 mm (8 in)
- Cartridge: 9×19mm Parabellum
- Action: Short-stroke gas-operated, closed rotating bolt
- Rate of fire: 850 RPM
- Feed system: 10-, 20-, 30- or 35-round detachable box magazine, 50-round drum magazine

The SIG MPX is a gas-operated submachine gun designed and manufactured by SIG Sauer, and is primarily chambered in 9×19mm Parabellum. It is a gas-operated firearm featuring a closed, rotating bolt. These design features, rare in submachine guns, were chosen to enhance the safety of the user and to have a more reliable firearm. It was designed in 2013 and was released to the general public in 2015. It features the SIG Sauer short stroke push-rod gas system to reduce the recoil and improve the reliability of the weapon.

The MPX, in its second generation, features a system that would allow for conversion from 9mm to .357 SIG or .40 S&W. However, since its inception, first party conversion kits have not been made available for either of the two production generations of the gun.

SIG Sauer also used the same gas piston system to develop the SIG MCX carbine.

== Design details ==
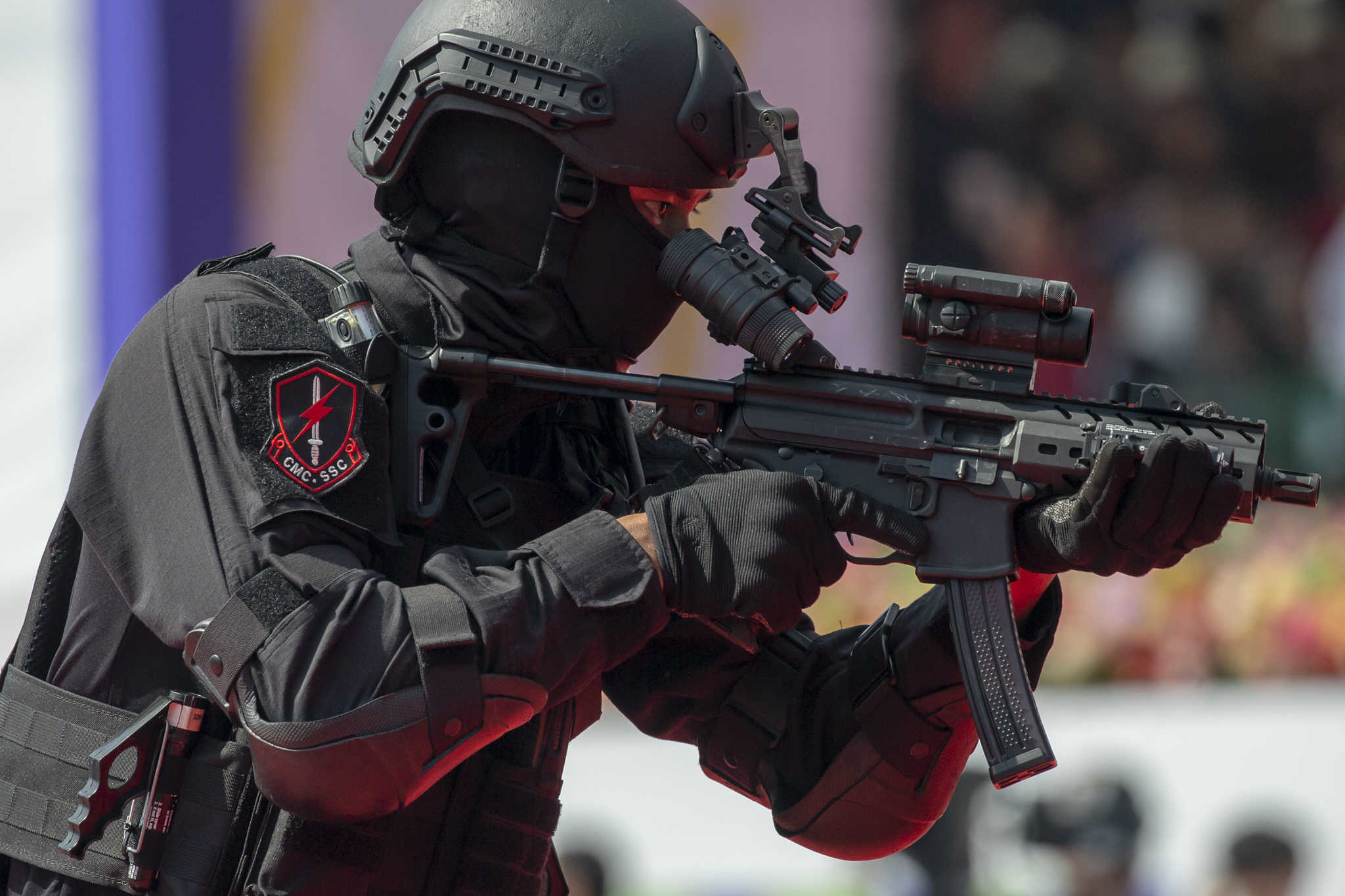
SIG MPX with Republic of China Marine Corps Special Service Company Operator

The standard variant of the MPX comes with an 8.0 inch (20.3 cm) barrel and is chambered in 9×19mm Parabellum. It comes with a collapsible stock and a free-floating rail. It has a cyclic rate of fire of 850 rounds per minute (RPM).

The MPX is also available with different barrel lengths, ranging from 114 to 406mm (4.5- to 16-inch). The MPX submachine gun is only available for military and law enforcement use, while a semi-automatic only version is also available for the civilian market.

The semi-automatic version of the weapon can be registered as a short-barreled rifle in most states in the United States.

=== Features ===
The standard MPX submachine gun comes with no sights and a full-length Picatinny rail system on the top of the weapon. Gen 2 MPX's come with a flat faced Timney trigger and M-LOK rail.

The MPX has a short-stroke gas piston system in order to increase the accuracy of the weapon which operates from a closed bolt. It is designed in this way to prevent water or dirt from entering the chamber and causing malfunctions as well as to use a suppressor with greater ease. It features an ambidextrous selector switch for fully automatic (law enforcement/military models) and semi-automatic. It also features an ambidextrous bolt release and ambidextrous magazine release. The barrel is free-floating and is surrounded by polymer/steel Picatinny rail (later M-LOK) mounts.

The charging handle of the weapon is at the back of the weapon, based on the AR-15 design. This is to ensure that cocking the weapon does not interfere with any optics mounted onto the Picatinny rail. The weapon's rails are made out of cast steel and the standard weapon overall weighs 2.1 kilograms (4.6 lb).

== Variants ==
=== Selective fire configurations ===
==== MPX (Standard variant) ====
A pistol variant with a three-position collapsible arm support with a stock-like appearance, three-position fire selector if it supports full automatic and an 14” blind pinned and welded muzzle brake 16”, 8.0, 6.0 4.5 inch barrel.

==== MPX-K (Compact variant) ====
A compact variant with a 114 mm (4.5 inch) barrel.

==== MPX-SD (Integrally suppressed variant) ====
A fully suppressed variant with an MP5SD-like integral suppressor, a longer fore-end and a 203 mm (8.0 inch) barrel.

=== Semi-automatic only configurations ===
==== MPX Pistol (Pistol variant) ====
A semi-automatic only pistol variant with no stock and a 203 mm (8.0 inch) barrel.

==== MPX PSB (Pistol variant) ====
A semi-automatic only pistol variant with a SIG SBX pistol stabilizing brace and an 203 mm (8.0 inch) barrel. In the US in 2015 the BATFE warned users of weapons using SIG stabilizing braces that shouldering a weapon fitted with a brace constituted the making of a Title II NFA weapon, reversing a prior ruling that it did not. In early 2017, however, the BATFE withdrew this opinion.

==== MPX-K (Pistol variant) ====
A semi automatic only pistol variant with a 114 mm (4.5 inch) barrel.

==== MPX-C (Carbine variant) ====
A semi-automatic only carbine variant, featuring a 165 mm (6.5 inch) barrel with a 241 mm (9.5 inch) muzzle device permanently welded to it, which is actually a modified version of the baffle core of the integrally suppressed variant. SIG contended that this device was a muzzle brake, but in 2013 the BATFE ruled that the component was a suppressor, and classified the MPX-C as possessing an integral suppressor and thus as a Title II NFA weapon. The BATFE rejected an appeal against this ruling in February 2014; SIG responded by filing a civil lawsuit against the BATFE, alleging they had acted in an "arbitrary and capricious manner". In September 2015, Federal Judge Paul Barbadora upheld the BATFE's ruling.

As a result of this SIG has announced a carbine variant with a 406 mm (16 inch) barrel without the muzzle device, designated as the MPX PCC.

== Users ==
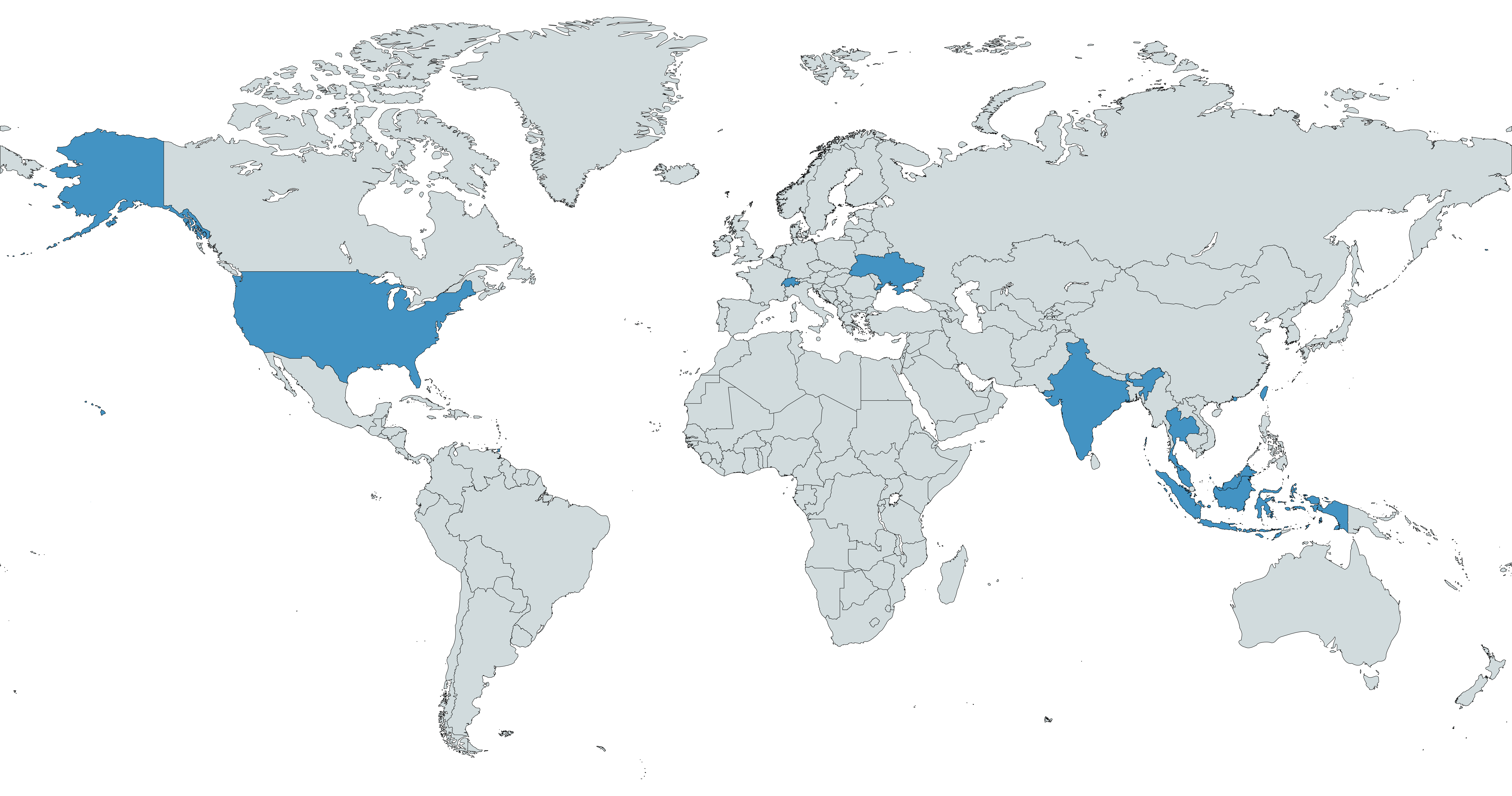
A map with SIG MPX users in blue.

Country	Organization/Notes	Reference
Hong Kong	Hong Kong Police Force, Hong Kong Correctional Service	
India	National Security Guards	
Indonesia	Detachment 88, counter-terrorism special detachment of the Indonesian National Police.	
Indonesia	Denjaka, counter-terrorism special operations force of the Indonesian Navy.	
Indonesia	Kopasgat, quick reaction forces command of the Indonesian Air Force.	
Malaysia	Malaysian Army	
Switzerland	Geneva Police	
Trinidad and Tobago	Trinidad and Tobago Police Service	
Thailand	Royal Thai Police	
Republic of China	Republic of China Army, Republic of China Marine Corps and Republic of China National Police Agency	
Ukraine	Armed Forces of Ukraine	
United States	United States Army: Up to 1,000 ordered through a commercial off-the-shelf contract in December 2018.	

== See also ==
- Flint River Armory CSA45
- SR-2 Veresk
- Type 79 submachine gun
- Zastava Master FLG
