= MV Sinar Kudus hijacking =

2011 ship hijaking

- Part of Piracy in Somalia, Operation Ocean Shield
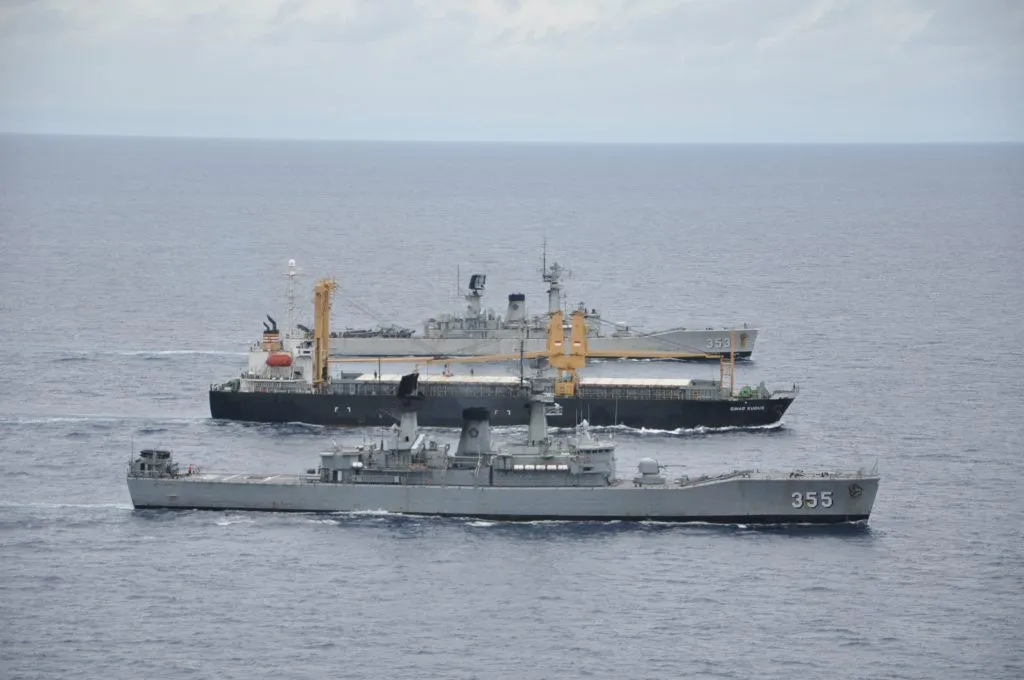
- MV Sinar Kudus escorted by frigates KRI Abdul Halim Perdanakusuma and KRI Yos Sudarso
Date	16 March – 1 May 2011
Location	456 nmi (845 km) off the coast of Somalia
Result	Indonesian victory; Pirate group defeated; Hostages rescued

Belligerents
Indonesia	Somali Pirates

Commanders and leaders
Col. Achmad Taufiqoerrochman; Lt.Col. Suhartono	Unknown

Units involved
Armed Forces; Indonesian Army; Kopassus; Indonesian Navy; Indonesian Marine Corps; Denjaka; Taifib; Indonesian Fleet Command; 2nd Fleet Command; Kopaska; Military Sealift Command	Somali Pirates

Strength
±900 personnel(including Denjaka, Kopaska and Kopassus); 2 frigates: KRI Abdul Halim Perdanakusuma; KRI Yos Sudarso; 1 landing platform dock: KRI Banjarmasin	1 lifeboat; at least 4 pirates

Casualties and losses
None	4 killed

The MV Sinar Kudus hijacking was a maritime event that began on 16 March 2011 with four pirates in the Indian Ocean seizing the cargo ship MV Sinar Kudus 456 nautical miles (845 km; 525 mi) east of Somali coast. The siege ended after a rescue effort by the Indonesian Navy on 1 May 2011. It was the first pirate seizure of an Indonesian merchant ship off the Somali coast.

== Background ==
On 16 March 2011, an Indonesian merchant ship, MV Sinar Kudus, was carrying nickel ore from South Sulawesi to Rotterdam when it was hijacked by Somali pirates in the Red Sea. After negotiations, the ship owner agreed to a ransom demand and restored the ship and crew to Indonesian authorities. It was then hijacked a second time by another group of pirates; after signalling "mayday" the ship's crew were supported by a group of Denjaka and Kopassus units of the Indonesian military from KRI Abdul Halim Perdanakusuma which secured the ship. A further group of Denjaka and Kopassus were deployed using a Bo 105 helicopter to strafe the pirates, all of whom were killed.

There were plans and preparations for an amphibious landing on Somalia by the Indonesian commanders if the hostages were taken ashore, but as the hostages and ship were rescued at sea, the plan was not executed.
