= CAR 816 =

Assault rifle

Caliber 5.56 mm, CAR 816
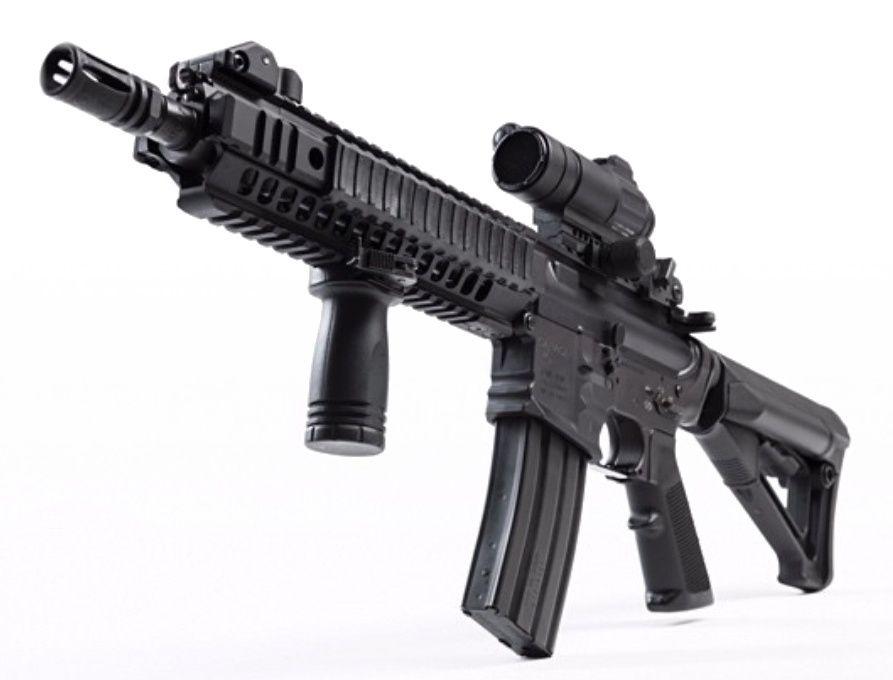
- CAR 816 assault rifle with mounted aiming optic and vertical forward grip
- Type: Assault rifle, Carbine, Personal defense weapon
- Place of origin: United Arab Emirates

Service history
- In service: 2014–present
- Used by: See Users below
- Wars: Saudi-led intervention in Yemen; Papua conflict

Production history
- Manufacturer: Caracal International; PC 816 V1: Pindad
- Produced: 2014–present
- Variants: See #Variants

Specifications
- Mass: 3.4 kg (7.50 lb) 406 mm barrel 3.3 kg (7.3 lb) 368 mm barrel 3.05 kg (6.7 lb) 267 mm barrel 2.92 kg (6.4 lb) 191 mm barrel
- Length: 925–840 mm (36.42–33.07 in) 406 mm barrel 887–802 mm (34.9–31.6 in) 368 mm barrel 778–694 mm (30.6–27.3 in) 267 mm barrel 709–627 mm (27.9–24.7 in) 191 mm barrel
- Barrel length: 406 mm (16.0 in); 368 mm (14.5 in); 267 mm (10.5 in); 191 mm (7.5 in)
- Cartridge: 5.56×45mm NATO
- Caliber: 5.56 mm (.223 in)
- Barrels: 1
- Action: Short-stroke piston, rotating bolt
- Rate of fire: 800 rounds/minute
- Muzzle velocity: 850 m/s (2,789 ft/s) 406 mm barrel
- Effective firing range: 550 m (601 yd) 406 mm barrel
- Feed system: 30-round detachable STANAG magazine
- Sights: Iron sights or various optics

The CAR 816, also called Caracal Sultan or simply Sultan, is a 5.56×45mm NATO, gas-operated, magazine-fed assault rifle that is produced by Caracal International in Abu Dhabi, United Arab Emirates.

== History ==
The Caracal CAR 816 shares lineage with the Heckler & Koch HK416.

On 5 March 2021, Caracal International LLC and PT Pindad Indonesia signed a partnership for joint-production of the CAR 816 for the Indonesian military.

== Design ==
The CAR 816 is based on the AR-15 platform ergonomic architecture, but uses a short-stroke gas piston operating system (unlike the AR-15's piston-operated gas impingement system) with a user-adjustable gas system.

=== Feeding ===
The CAR 816 features a Draft STANAG 4179 compliant magazine well and is fed with STANAG magazines with a standard capacity of 30 rounds.

Other STANAG compatible box and drum magazines can be used.

=== Operation ===
The CAR 816 uses a proprietary bolt carrier and a special tungsten granules containing buffer to manage bolt carrier bounce and soften recoil.

The CAR 816's chamber is modified, so the rifle is over-the-beach capable to let the rifle fire safely as quickly as possible after being submerged in water.

With the help of the three position regulator (normal, adverse conditions and suppressor/silencer settings), the gas system can be adjusted to function reliably with various propellant, projectile, fouling, operating environment and configuration specific pressure behavior.

The CAR 816 uses a mil-spec direct trigger. The selector settings are: safe, semi-automatic fire and automatic fire.

=== Ergonomics ===
The CAR 816 handguard features four Picatinny rails, allowing direct accessory attachment onto the mounting points, and can be removed without tools.

The CAR 816 basic version features rail mounted flip up rear and front iron sights. The integrated rail on the upper receiver and its continuation on the handguard at the 12 o'clock position allows for the adaptation of various aiming optics.

The shoulder stock is a telescoping 6 position type stock which is adjustable for length of pull.

=== Interoperability with M4 ===
The CAR 816 shares most components with the M4 arms family, with a few exceptions.

The M4 carbine profile hammer forged chrome lined barrel has a 178 mm (7.0 in) twist rate and features a standard A2-style flash suppressor at its muzzle end. All lower receiver components are interchangeable with the M4 arms family.

The amount of movement between the upper and lower receiver is minimized by a tension tube.

Due to their complete manufacture in the United Arab Emirates, the arms are not subject to United States’ imposed International Traffic in Arms Regulations, whilst sharing most components with the M4 arms family extensively used by the US Armed Forces.

== Users ==
=== Current users ===
- Ethiopia - carbine variant used by the Republican Guard.
- Indonesia - PC 816 V1 in used with Kopassus, Kostrad and the Indonesian Marine Corps.
- United Arab Emirates - 80,000 assault rifles for the United Arab Emirates Armed Forces.

=== Non-state users ===
- Free Papua Movement - Captured from the Indonesian military.

=== Failed bids ===
- India: 93,895 carbines ordered in September 2018. The order was cancelled in September 2020 in favour of domestically developed carbines under the Atmanirbhar Bharat initiative. Later that month Caracal offered to manufacture the weapons in India. In 2022, Caracal responded to a tender for procurement of 4.25 lakh carbines for Indian Armed Forces.
- South Korea - Considered by Dasan Machineries as a candidate to replace the Daewoo Precision Industries K1 used by the Republic of Korea Army Special Warfare Command. Instead, Dasan Machineries submitted the DSAR-15PC as a domestic design became a tender requirement.
