= Denjaka =

Indonesian Navy counter-terrorism unit

Jala Mangkara Detachment
- Detasemen Jala Mengkara
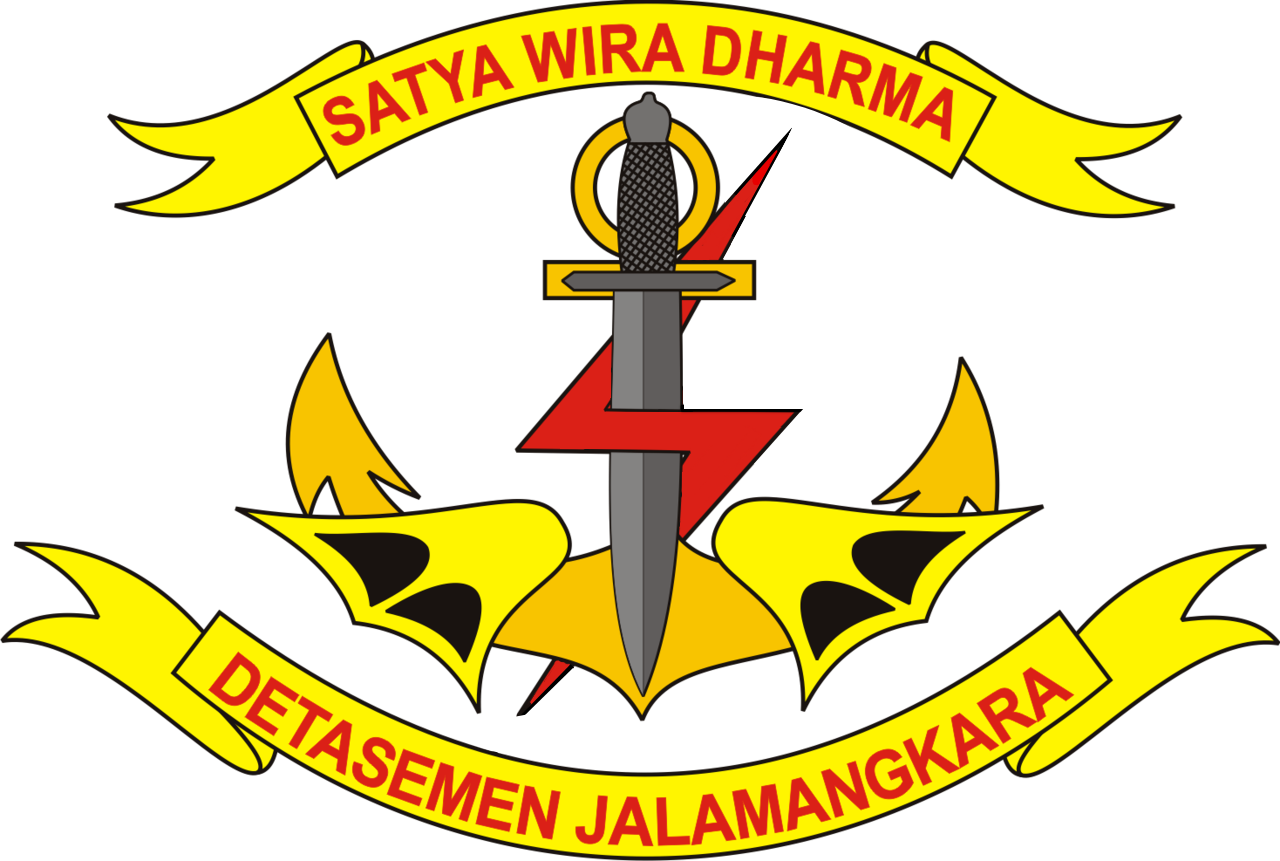
- Active: 13 November 1984 – present
- Country: Indonesia
- Branch: Indonesian Navy
- Type: Navy Special Forces
- Size: Detachment
- Part of: Indonesian Marine Corps
- Garrison/HQ: Cilandak, Jakarta
- Nickname: Hantu Laut
- Mottos: Satya Wira Dharma ("Ready to act against any threat of danger")
- Beret color: Reddish Purple
- Anniversaries: 4 November
- Engagements: Insurgency in East Timor; Insurgency in Papua; Insurgency in Aceh; MV Sinar Kudus hijacking

Commanders
- Current commander: Colonel (Marine) Rino Rianto

Denjaka (abbreviation from Detasemen Jala Mengkara; Jala Mangkara Detachment) is a counter-terrorism special operations force of the Indonesian Navy. It is a combined detachment formed from selected personnel of the Navy's frogmen unit (KOPASKA) and the Marine Corps' Amphibious Reconnaissance Battalion (Taifib).

== History ==
On 4 November 1982, the Chief of Staff of the Navy issued a decree (No. Skep/2848/XI/1982) to form a task force called Pasukan Khusus Laut/ Pasusla or Naval Special Forces, to fulfill the need for a maritime special operations force capable of countering terrorism and sabotage. In the initial phase, 70 personnel from the Marine Corps Amphibious Reconnaissance Battalion and Navy frogmen were recruited to form Pasusla. The new unit, then a company, was under the command of the Western Fleet commander with assistance from the Commandant of the Marine Corps, while the Chief of Staff of the Navy acted as the operational commander of the Pasusla. The unit was then based at Western Fleet Command Headquarters, Jakarta.

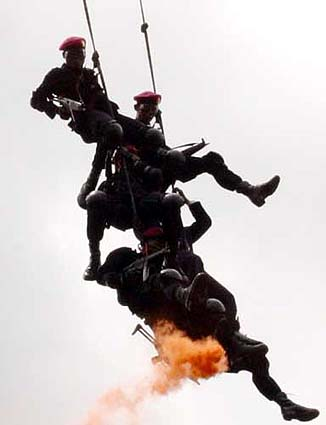
Denjaka seamen during training

Upon further development of this unit, on 13 November 1984, the Chief of Staff of the Navy requested the then Commander of the Indonesian National Armed Forces, General Leonardus Benjamin Moerdani, to formalize the raising of a naval special forces unit, which was approved and through the issuance of an approval letter (No. R/39/08/9/2/SPN), officially sanctioned. In 1997, after the issuance of Chief of Staff of the Navy decree No: Kep/42/VII/1997 dated 31 July that year, the formation was officially named the Jala Mangkara Detachment.

== Mission ==
Denjaka's primary task is to conduct anti-terrorism, anti-sabotage, and other clandestine operations, maritime counter-terrorism, counter-sabotage, and other special operations as directed by the commander of the armed forces. Denjaka personnel can approach a target by sea, underwater, and vertically from the air as its members are qualified to be deployed as paratroopers. Aside from counter-terrorism-related tasks, Denjaka also used to deploy for the security of VIPs.

== Organisational structure ==
According to the Indonesian Navy organization, Denjaka is a Marine Corps task force under the Indonesian Navy, with the commander of the Marine Corps holding responsibility for general training, while specific training falls under the responsibilities of the chief of Armed Forces Strategic Intelligence Agency, such as anti-terror, anti-sabotage and clandestine operations with marine aspect. Operational command falls directly under the commander of the armed forces. Denjaka HQ is located on Gunung Sahari Street no 67 Central Jakarta.

Denjaka organization consists of one HQ team, one technical team, and four operational elements, which are:

- Detachment I for counter-terrorism and counter-piracy
- Detachment II for maritime raids and intelligence-gathering missions
- Detachment III for search and rescue
- Detachment IV for underwater demolition

== Recruitment and training ==
Personnel of Denjaka are trained at Bumi Marinir Cilandak, South Jakarta, and must complete four months of training called Penanggulangan Teror Aspek Laut (PTAL). Their field of operations is in the form of ships, offshore installations, and coastal areas.

== Bibliography ==
- Conboy, Kenneth J. (2008). Elite: The Special Forces of Indonesia, 1950-2008. Equinox Pub. ISBN 9789793780603.
