= Taifib =

Indonesian Marine Corps amphibious reconnaissance unit

Amphibious Reconnaissance Battalion
- Batalyon Intai Amfibi
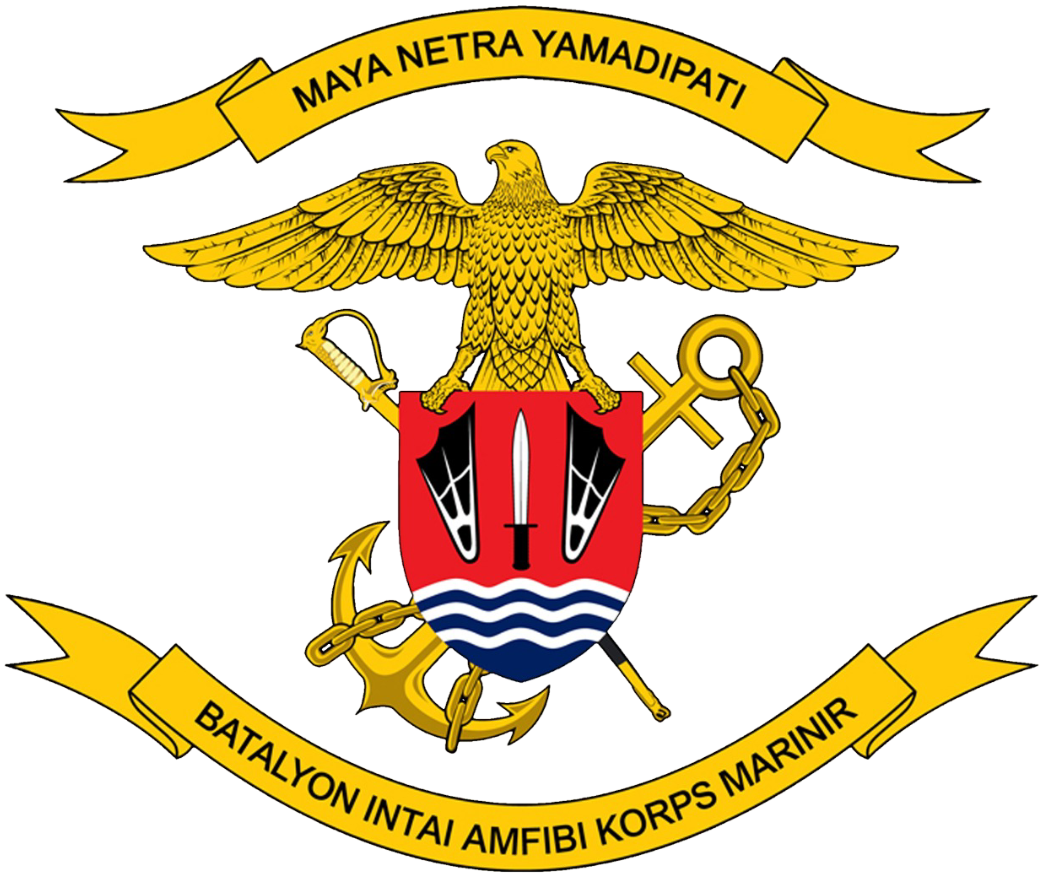
- Active: 13 March 1961 – present
- Country: Indonesia
- Branch: Indonesian Navy
- Type: Amphibious Special Forces
- Size: Classified
- Part of: Indonesian Marine Corps
- Garrison/HQ: Yontaifib-1 HQ (Kesatrian Batalyon Intai Amfibi-1), Marunda, Jakarta; Yontaifib-2 HQ (Kesatrian Batalyon Intai Amfibi-2), Karangpilang, Surabaya; Yontaifib-3 HQ (Kesatrian Batalyon Intai Amfibi-3), Klamono, Sorong
- Nickname: Hantu Laut (Ghost of the Sea)
- Mottos: Mayanetra Yamadipati (Sanskrit) "Invisible, Angel of Death"
- Beret color: Reddish Purple
- Anniversaries: 13 March
- Engagements: Western New Guinea (Papua) - 1950s; Operation Trikora; Papua conflict; Indonesia-Malaysia Confrontation; Indonesian invasion of East Timor; Insurgency in Aceh; MV Sinar Kudus Hijacking

Taifib (Indonesian: Batalyon Intai Amfibi) is an elite recon unit within the Indonesian Marine Corps which is tasked for conducting amphibious reconnaissance and special reconnaissance. It is operationally similar to the Combat Reconnaissance Platoon (Indonesian: Peleton Intai Tempur, abbreviated "Tontaipur") from the Army's Kostrad corps. Taifib was previously known as Kipam (abbreviation from: Komando Intai Para Amfibi) which literally means in English: the Para-Amphibious reconnaissance Commandos.

They were officially formed on 13 March 1961 as Kipam. Set at a regimental strength of two battalions, "Taifib" is formed basically as the elite amphibious reconnaissance unit of the Indonesian Marine Corps. It was first deployed for conflict management in Irian Jaya (Papua) in April 1962. Starting from November 1971 it was called Batalyon Intai Amphibi ("Yon Taifib") or Amphibious Recon Battalion.

== History ==
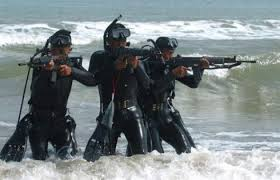
Taifib Marines during an exercise in Melonguane, North Sulawesi.

Taifib Marines with Force Recon Marines during RECONEX 21

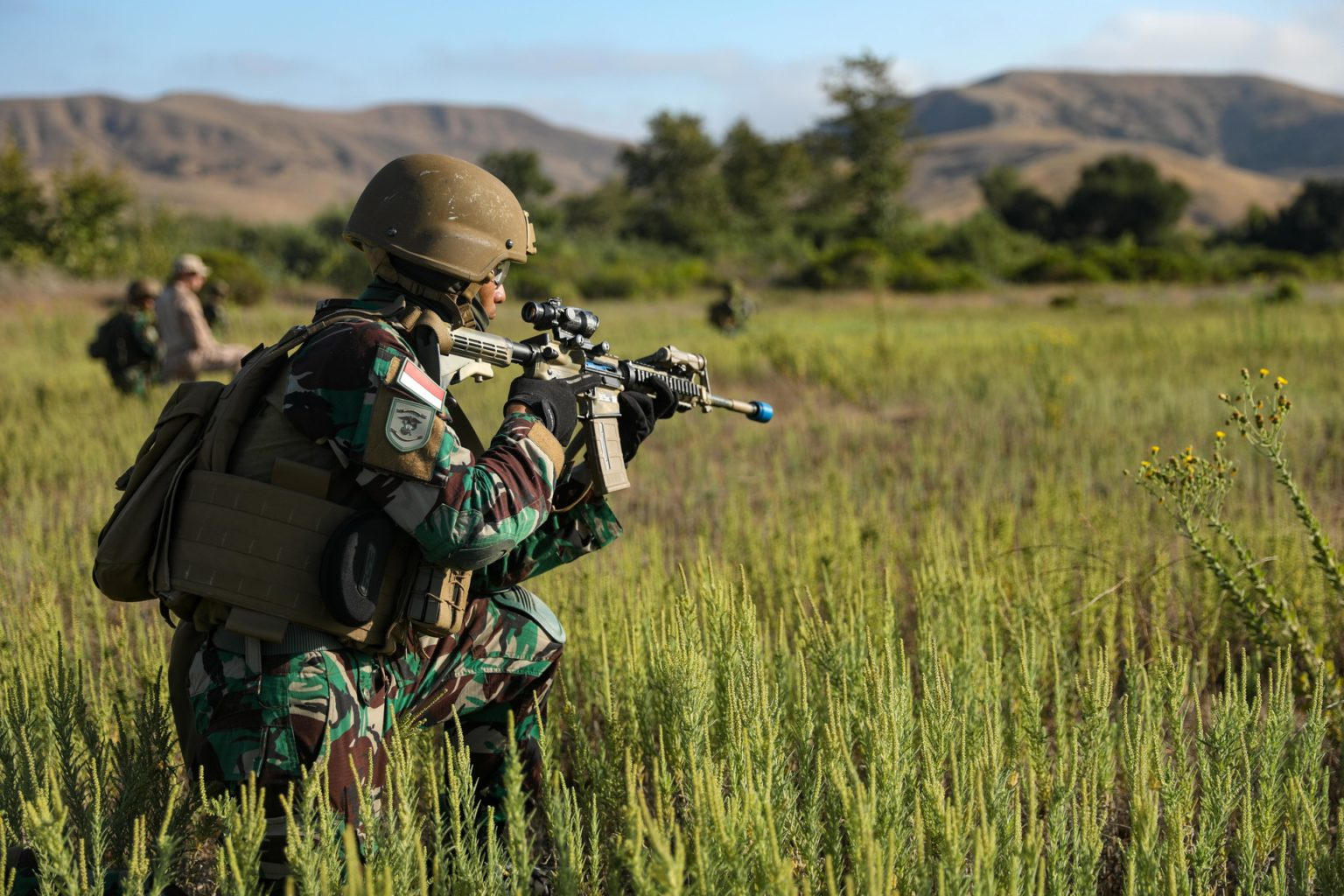
Taifib Marines during RECONEX 21 at Marine Corps Base Camp Pendleton, California, Sept. 6, 2021

At the time of the establishment of the Indonesian Marine Corps, the marine corps lacked the capability of intelligence, as well as special forces trained and able to carry out special activities that can not be done by ordinary units. Answering the need for an intelligence gathering unit, on March 13, 1961, the Marine Corps High Command issued a decree (No.47/KP/KKO/1961) regarding the formation of the Para-Amphibious Reconnaissance Commando Unit (Komando Intai Para-Amfibi / KIPAM). Those marines received training at the British-run Jungle Warfare Center in Malaya. During the following year a second group attended U.S. Marine reconnaissance training at Coranado. These cadres were combined to form the core of an elite reconnaissance unit combining airborne and amphibious skills.

The KIPAM unit first saw action during Operation Trikora, as part of the Indonesian forces forward deployed to Western New Guinea as part of their operations against the armed forces of the Netherlands. KIPAM and Kopassus personnel on loan to KOPASKA both were responsible for the retrieval of the bodies of the seven victims of the 30 September Movement of 1965, in the presence of senior military officials. On July 25, 1970, KIPAM, then a detachment sized formation, was transformed into a battalion, the Yon lntai Para Amfibi. On 17 November 1971, Yon lntai Para Amfibi was again renamed into Satuan Intai Amfibi, eventually renamed again into Batalyon Intai Amphibi, abbreviated YonTaifib. The unit was placed under the Marine Corps Combat Support Regiment.

Along with the development of the Marine Corps and the inauguration of the 1st Marine Force (Pasukan Marinir 1), on 12 March 2001, the Marine Corps General Command issued a decree (No. Skep/08/111/2001) in which Taifib are no longer placed under the Marine Corps Combat Regiment and are now under the jurisdiction of the newly formed 1st Marine Forces. Looking at the scope of the assignment and its capabilities, Taifib was finally officially designated as a Special Forces of the Indonesian Navy. This was reinforced by a decree issued by the Commander of the National Armed Forces (Skep/1857/XI/2003) on 18 November 2003. To complement the expansion of the Corps a second battalion assigned to the 2nd Marine Forces was raised in 2008, and a 3rd is under formation, assigned to the 3rd Marine Forces.

== Mission ==
Yontaifib has the main duty of fostering and providing the amphibious elements for amphibious operations as well as becoming the reconnaissance operation unit for the Indonesian Navy task force which cooperates with the Indonesian Marine Corps. The nickname of the "Sea Ghost" (Hantu Laut) was given to the Taifib unit due to their deadly capabilities within the sea/ocean. Taifib unit has individual abilities above the average of ordinary soldiers and is able to quickly adapt to every operational surrounding environment. Infiltration and en-filtration capabilities to enemy areas, free fall with HALO and HAHO, STABO / SPIE systems, swimming, diving, and underwater capabilities as combat swimmers through submarine torpedo launchers become the most lethal capabilities possessed by this unit.

== Recruitment and Training ==
Taifib accepts volunteers from the Marines with at least two years' experience. Ten months of commando training include a one-month airborne course: airborne qualification wings are presented after five day jumps, one night jump, and one 'rough terrain' jungle jump. Refresher jumps are conducted into the water.

== Motto ==
Maya Netra Yamadipati, which originally comes from Sanskrit, is the motto of the Taifib, which means:

- Mayanetra - Invisible
- Yamadipati - Angel of Death

The overall motto means that every Taifib member has the ability to move quickly, secretly and lethally in every mission.

== Bibliography ==
- Conboy, Kenneth (1991). South-East Asian Special Forces. London: Osprey Publishing. ISBN 1855321068.
