= KOPASKA =

Indonesian Navy special operations and demolition unit

Frogman Forces Command
- Komando Pasukan Katak
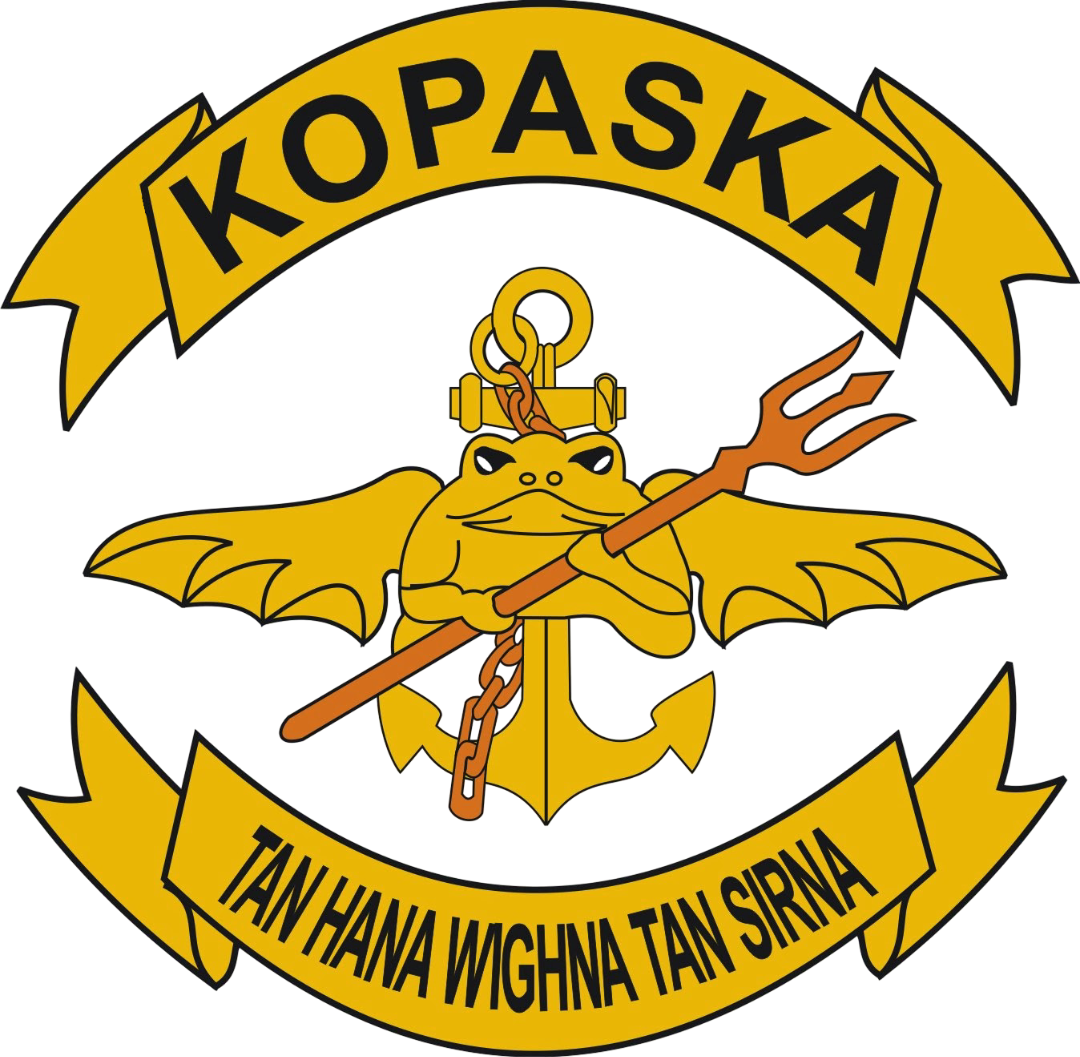
- Active: 31 March 1962 – present
- Country: Indonesia
- Branch: Indonesian Navy (TNI-AL)
- Type: Naval Special Forces
- Role: Sea and Underwater Special Operations
- Size: Classified
- Part of: Indonesian Fleet Command
- Garrison/HQ: 1st Indonesia Fleet Naval Base (KOARMADA I): Pondok Dayung, Tanjung Priok Jakarta; 2nd Indonesia Fleet Naval Base (KOARMADA II): Ujung, Surabaya; 3rd Indonesia Fleet Naval Base (KOARMADA III): Sorong
- Nickname: Hantu Laut (Ghost of the Sea)
- Mottos: Tan Hana Wighna Tan Sirna ("There is no obstacles that cannot be defeated")
- Colours: Maroon berets, previously dark blue
- Mascot: Green Flying Frog
- Anniversaries: 31 March
- Engagements: Western New Guinea (Papua) - 1950s: Operation Trikora; Papua conflict; East Timor military campaign (Operation Seroja) 1975; Indonesia-Malaysia Confrontation; Insurgency in Aceh; MV Sinar Kudus hijacking

The Kopaska (Indonesian: Komando Pasukan Katak, lit. 'Frogman Forces Command') is the premier frogman and underwater demolition unit of the Indonesian Navy. The unit's motto is Tan Hana Wighna Tan Sirna (Sanskrit for "There is no obstacle that cannot be defeated"). The unit's main duties are underwater demolition (raiding enemy ships and bases), destroying main underwater installations, reconnaissance, prisoner snatches, preparing beaches for larger naval amphibious operations, and counter-terrorism. During peacetime, the unit also deploys a team to serve as security personnel for VIPs and VVIPs.

The personnel of Kopaska are recruited from Indonesian Navy seamen. Like other Indonesian special forces, Kopaska is trained to be able to conduct operations in the sea, including underwater, on land and airborne.

== History ==
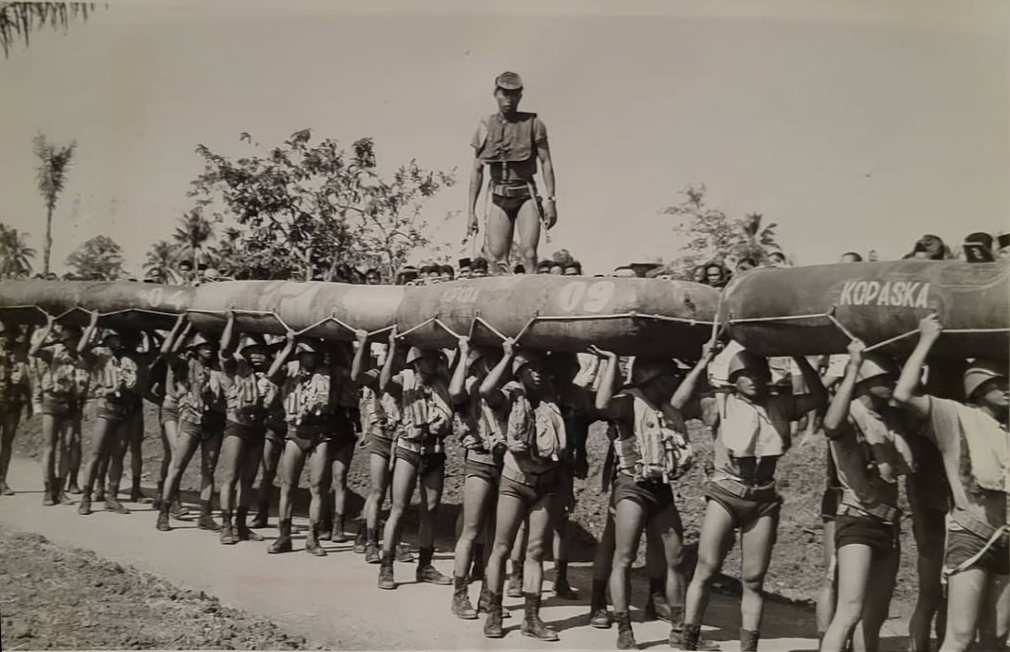
The first class of Kopaska, carrying boats from Kebajoran to Tandjung Priok beach, Djakarta, circa 1963.

Kopaska was heavily influenced by the early US Navy Frogman Underwater Demolition Teams (UDTs) and modern Navy SEAL Teams.

Kopaska was officially established on 31 March 1962 by President Sukarno to help his campaign Operation Trikora in Western New Guinea. However, in 1954, Captain (Navy) Iskak had an idea to form a frogman unit in the Navy which eventually act as precursor to Kopaska.

Early Kopaska members Captain (Navy) Urip Santoso, Lieutenant (Navy) Joko Suyatno, and PO1C EMP Joseph trained with the UDTs in the United States. The tradition of overseas training has continued with a few men from the unit travelling each year to Coronado, California, and Norfolk, Virginia, to participate in SEAL training. Returning to Indonesia, these men then recruit new personnel for Kopaska.

Recruitment was difficult in the early years of Kopaska as only a few navy members could pass the qualification process. Recruitment became even more difficult when President Sukarno announced in 1961 the commencement of Operation Trikora in Western New Guinea (then the Netherlands New Guinea), as Kopaska were required to conduct beach reconnaissance, beach clearing, prisoner snatches, and human torpedo missions. The latter two missions were the most daring planned by Kopaska – the first planned to snatch Rear Admiral Reeser, Commander-in-Chief of the Dutch Armed Forces in the Territory, and the human torpedo was aimed at Dutch aircraft carrier Karel Doorman. Due to a lack of personnel, Kopaska had to borrow 21 troops from the army special forces, which at that time was still called RPKAD - Army Paracommando Regiment, including Colonel Sarwo Edhie Wibowo, the then-regimental commander, and three from the Greater Jakarta Military Region Command (Kodam Jaya, now known as Kodam Jayakarta). The plans were cancelled when a ceasefire was implemented between Indonesia and the Netherlands.

Of the troops assigned to the Trikora campaign, the three Army personnel from Kodam Jaya (Maksum, Alex Sunaryo, and Budi Suroyo) attended Seaman School in the Naval Education and Training Command (Kodikal) and became regular members of Kopaska. 18 of 21 RPKAD wanted to stay with the Navy, but the Commander of RPKAD (Major General Mung Pahardimulyo) did not approve the transfers. Instead, he accommodated the ex-KOPASKA members by creating a new special unit in Kopassus SAT GULTOR 81-2 Batt.

Until the present, Kopaska trained their specialities to other Indonesian Special Forces units:

1. Army Kopassus counter-terrorist combat divers, now known as Paska GULTOR.
2. Army Strategic Command Reconnaissance Platoon and counter-terrorist team, the Tontaipur.
3. Air Force Satuan Bravo 90 counter-terrorist team.

Both SAT-81 GULTOR and DENBRAVO-90 continues to send its top members for three months of training in Frogmen School (Sepaskal) at the Special Training Centre (Pusdiksus), Naval Warfare Centre (Pusdikopsla), Naval Education and Training Command (Kodikal) located in Naval Base Moro Krembangan in Surabaya, East Java.

== Organization ==
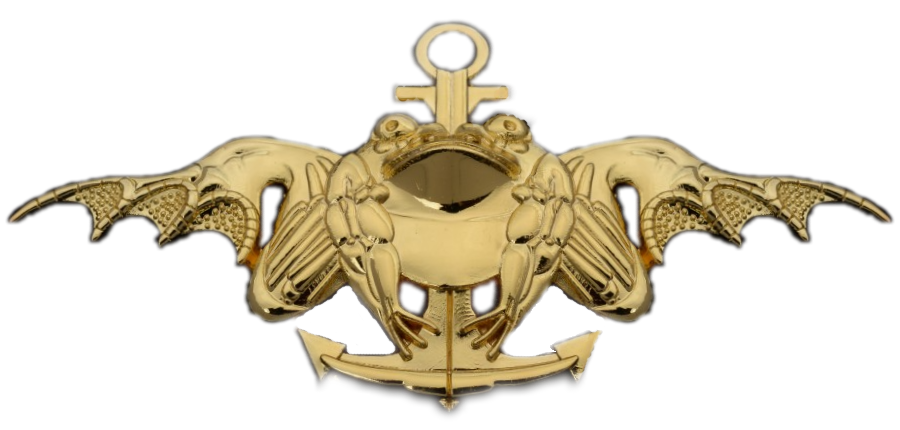
Badge of Kopaska.

1. 1st Fleet Frogman Command Unit (Satkopaska Koarmada 1)
  1. Command HQ
  2. Detachment 1 Sabotage / Anti-Sabotage (Terror)
  3. Detachment 2 of Special Operations
  4. Detachment 3 Combat SAR
  5. Detachment 4 EOD and Naval Minesweeping
  6. Detachment 5 Underwater Demolition
  7. Detachment 6 Special Boat Units
2. 2nd Fleet Frogman Command Unit (Satkopaska Koarmada 2)
  1. Command HQ
  2. Detachment 1 Sabotage / Anti-Sabotage (Terror)
  3. Detachment 2 of Special Operations
  4. Detachment 3 Combat SAR
  5. Detachment 4 EOD and Naval Minesweeping
  6. Detachment 5 Underwater Demolition
  7. Detachment 6 Special Boat Units
3. 3rd Fleet Frogman Command Unit (Satkopaska Koarmada 3)
  1. Command HQ
  2. Detachment 1 Sabotage / Anti Sabotage (Terror)
  3. Detachment 2 of special Operations
  4. Detachment 3 Combat SAR
  5. Detachment 4 EOD and Naval Minesweeping
  6. Detachment 5 Underwater Demolition
  7. Detachment 6 Special Boat Units

== Recruitment ==
The recruitment process for becoming a Kopaska frogmen is similar to that of the US Navy SEALs. The criteria are:

- An Indonesian Navy personnel
- Has served minimum 2 years in a Navy warship/Navy base/Navy fleet command/Navy Headquarters/Military Sealift Command
- Passed Physical fitness qualification
- Passed water endurance
- Passed special psychological test
- Passed special underwater fitness

The initial recruitment process takes place annually at all Indonesian naval bases, so location is not a concern. Candidates who fulfill the initial criteria are then brought to the Kopaska Training Center to participate in the selection process. Of the 300-1500 candidates, only 36 to 20 actually complete the initial selection process. Those who pass the initial selection then receive advanced training at the Kopaska training center. Those who pass the advanced training then graduate to become a member of the Kopaska Unit. Only 0-20 personnel per year graduate to become a full member of Kopaska.

== Training and Education ==
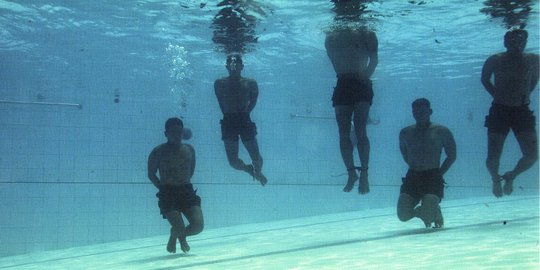
The Indonesian Navy soldiers participating in the frogman training took part in a diving endurance test as one of the mandatory qualifications of Kopaska.

The training process lasts ten months, divided into four continual training phases: physical endurance/physical training, basic underwater training, commando training, and parachute (Airborne) training. The training lasts with a phase called the "Hell Week" where Kopaska trainees are beasted and are forced to undergo brutal special forces training until exceeding average human resilience. This applies to all ranks applying to join the Kopaska unit.

Each phase of training consists of a similar process. For example, the first phase of training is physical or endurance training. Each candidate receives a daily physical training program, such as: running, marching, push-ups, sit ups, pull-ups, swimming, etc. The training programs are unscheduled, so the instructor can order physical training at random. The last week of this training each candidate must be able to demonstrate strength through trials such as cross-Strait swimming and rowing to Laki Island at night with little food or sleep. This training usually exploits the candidate's physical and psychological strength.

The remaining training phases include combat swimming, infiltration through submarine torpedo tube, long range combat patrol, close quarter battle, infiltration using CRRC or RIB, intelligence course, parachute training (including combat free-fall, static line, and HAHO/HALO), pathfinder, trap making and survival techniques.

=== Education ===
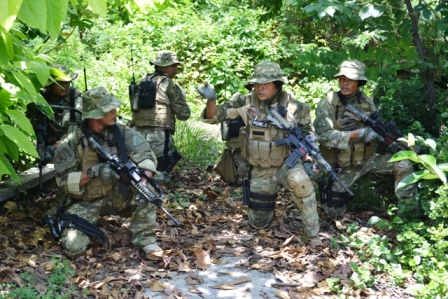
Kopaska during Jungle warfare

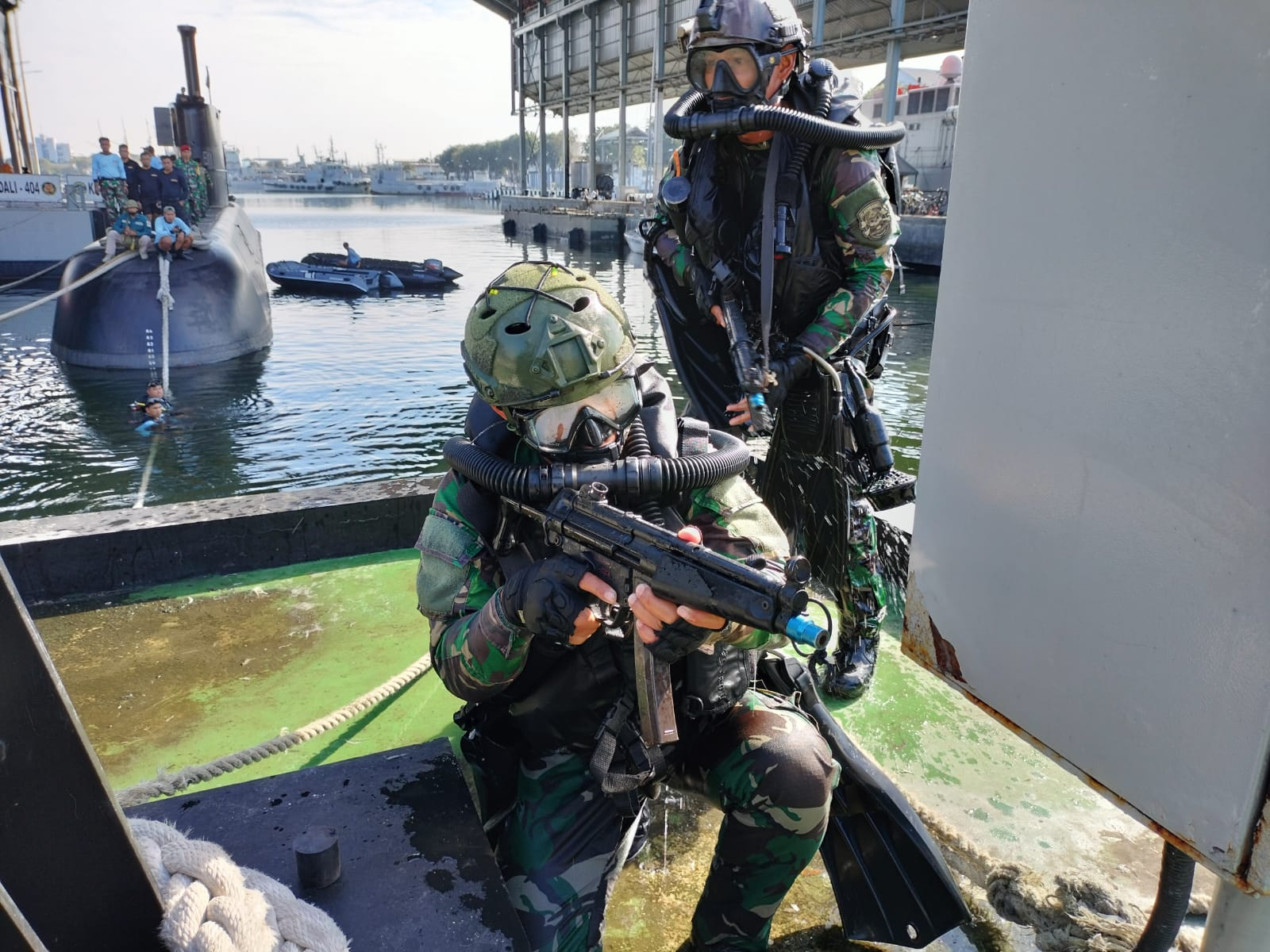
Kopaska operators conducts infiltration exercise using KRI Ardadedali – 404 combat submarine.

- General navy academic courses, such as: Sea Operations, Navigation, Machinery, Electronics, Ships construction, Communication, etc.
- Kopaska indoctrination (frogman doctrine, basic diving, combat diving, combat swimming, cartography, shooting different types of weapons, driving and handling ships and speed boats)
- Commando education (Jungle warfare, jungle survival, etc.)
- Airborne
- Clandestine
- Underwater demolition
- Combat search and rescue

== Joint Exercise ==
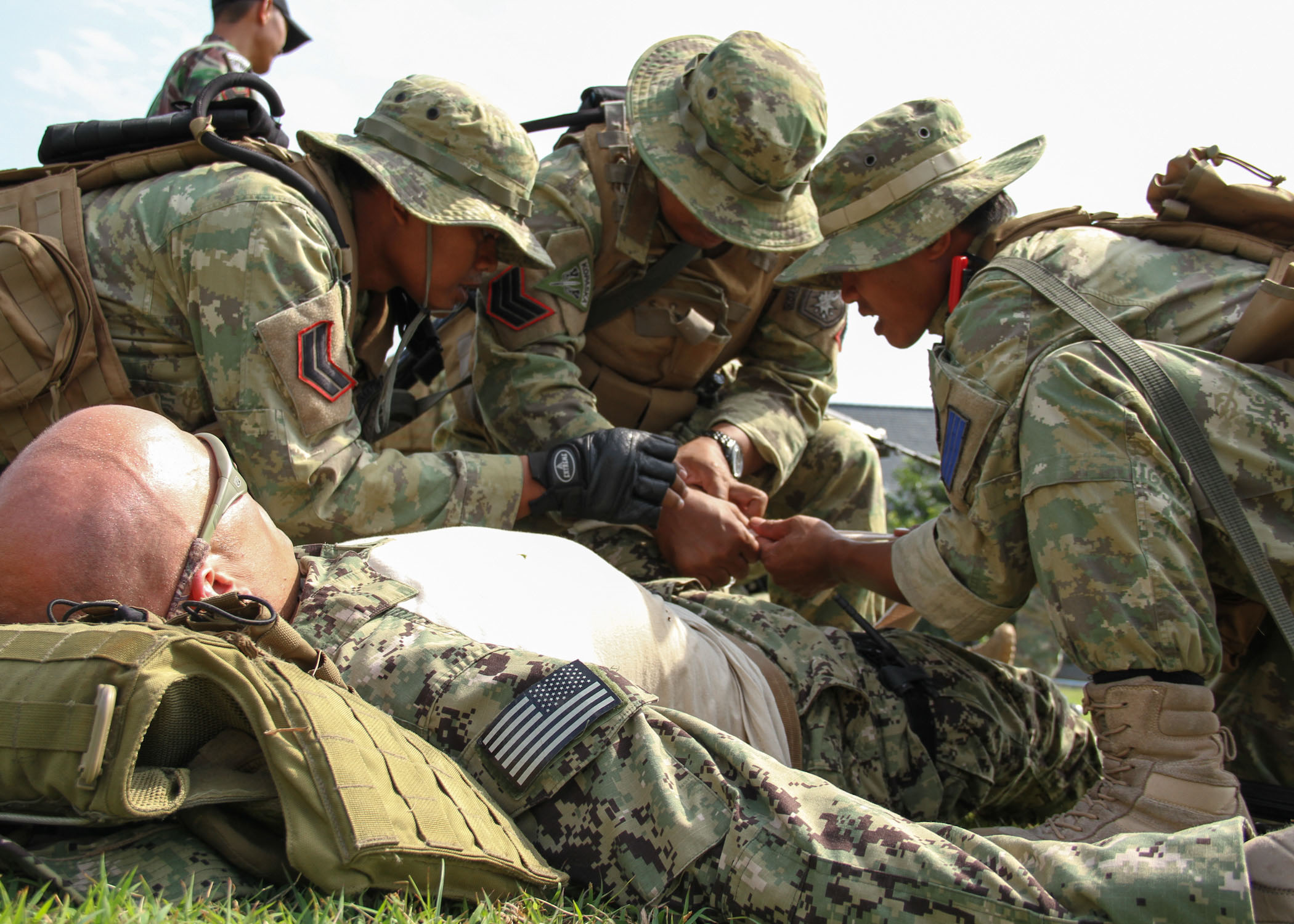
Kopaska and US Navy SEAL, 5 June 2012.

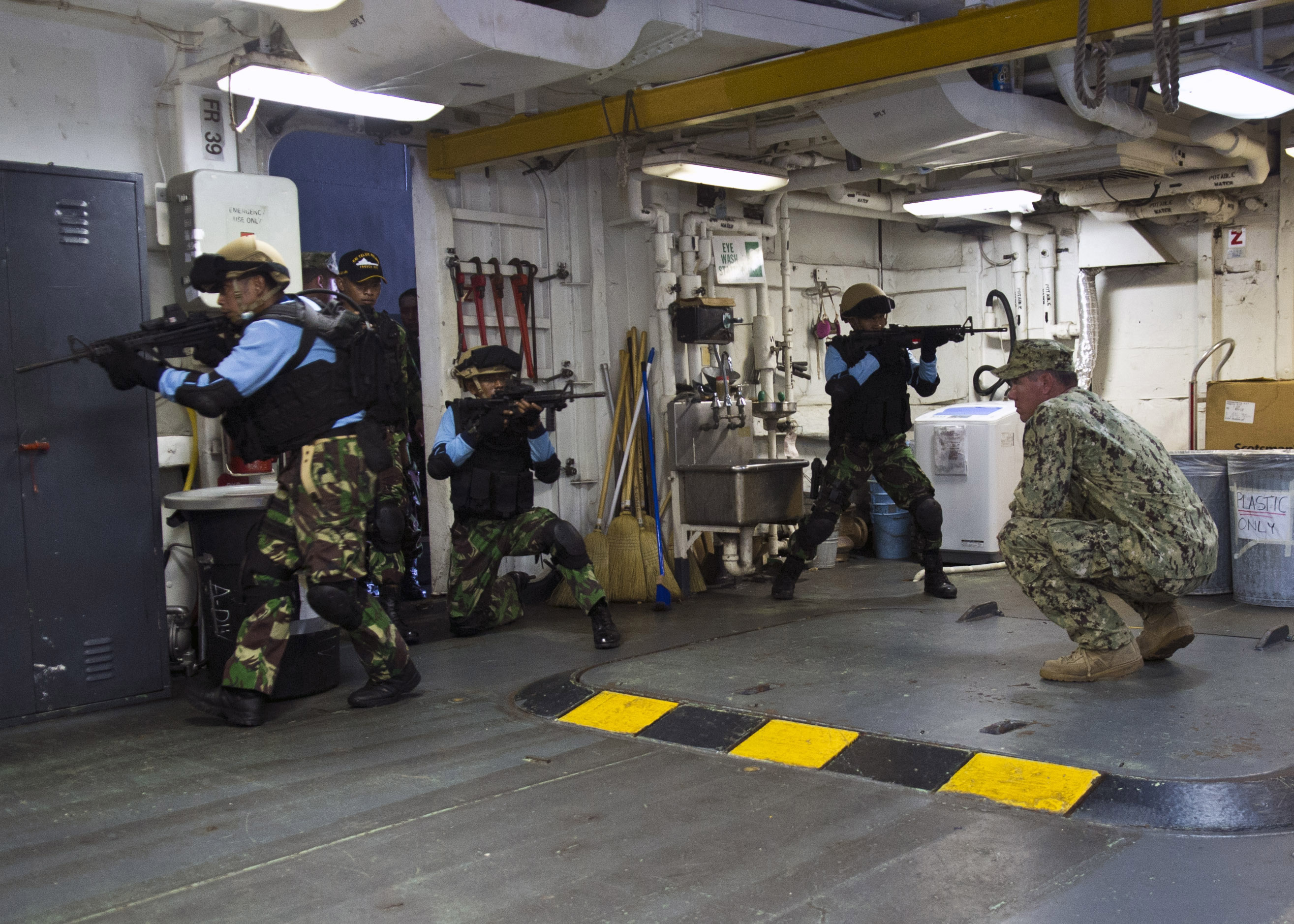
Kopaska frogmen simulate seizing a room in a Naval warship during training with the US Navy, 24 May 2013.

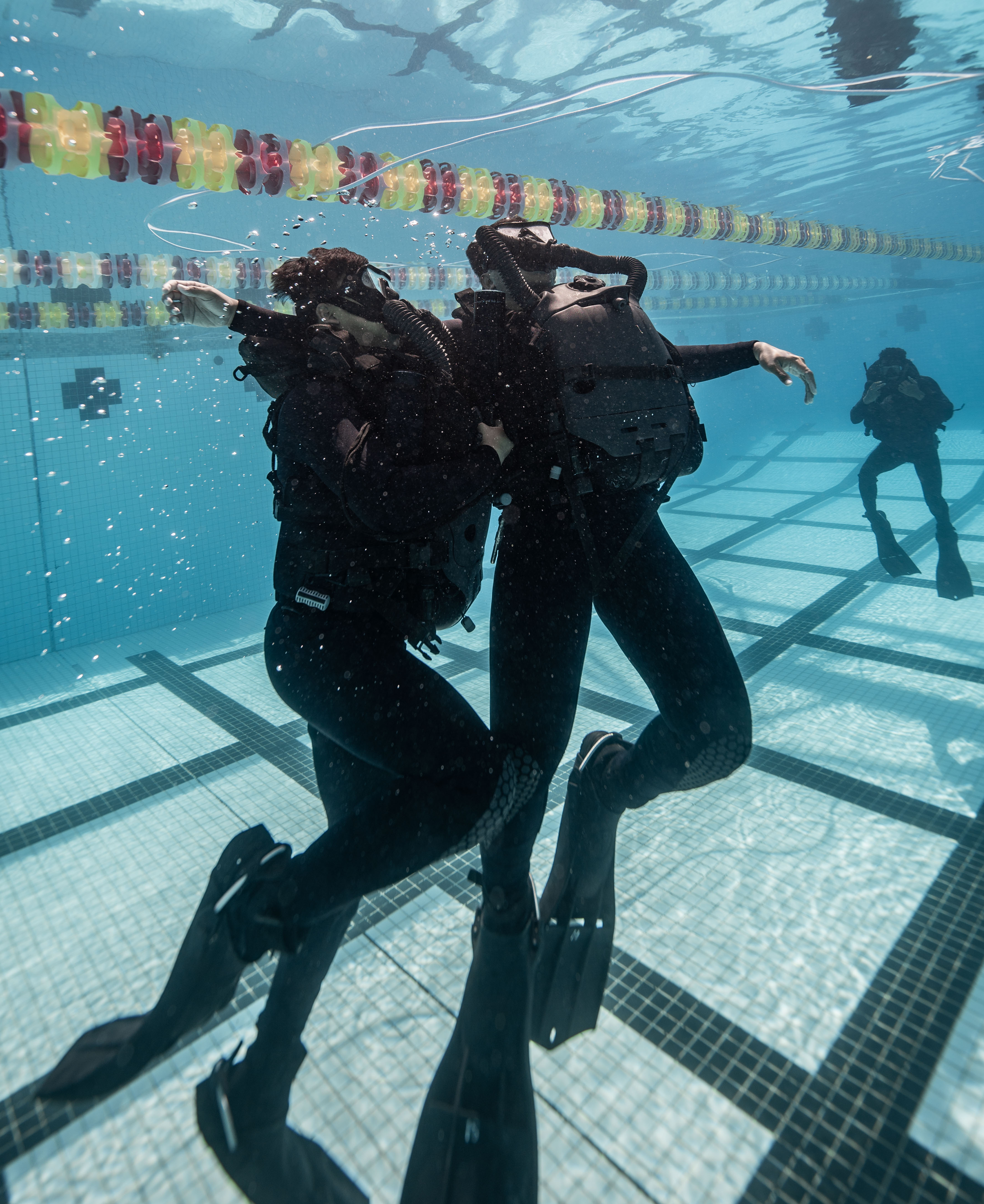
Kopaska operators carry out diver rescue training with NSW operators during exercise RIMPAC 2024 at US Marine Corps Base Hawaii, Kaneohe Bay, 18 July 2024.

Kopaska has conducted several joint exercises with other elite naval forces from other countries.

- FLASH IRON with US Navy SEALs and United States Navy Riverine Squadron;
- Joint Combined Exchange Training (JCET) with U.S. Naval Special Warfare;
- PANDU EX with Republic of Singapore Navy Naval Diving Unit (NDU);
- Malindo Malaysia & Indonesia (Exercise with TLDM PASKAL in Maritime Interdiction Operation);
- PANDU EODEX with Republic of Singapore Navy Naval Diving Unit / RSN-NDU alternately Singapore and Indonesia;
- MINEX with Republic of Singapore Navy;
- SEA EAGLE with Republic of Singapore Navy;
- MCMEX / DIVEX with NAVAL EOD Team from 25 Asia Pacific countries in Asia Pacific;
- Joint Exercise with Pakistan SSG Navy;
- Balance Iron with US Army Airborne & Ranger US Army;
- Various Series of USINDOPACOM Training Programs: Naval Engagement Activity (NEA), Subject Matter Expert Exchange (SMEE), Peace Support Initiative Operations (GPOI), Cooperation Afloat Readiness and Training (CARAT), Super Garuda Shield, Rim of the Pacific (RIMPAC);
- Various Training Series UN Peacekeeping Operation: Khan Quest (Mongolia), Cobra Gold (Thailand-USPACOM) Global Positive Operation Initiative (GPOI) USPACOM (UNMOC, UNSOC, PSOIC, Traine of Trainer / ToT), ADF Warfare Center UNMOC & CIMIC (Australia), UNDPKO ITS ToT in Jakarta;
- UN Peacekeeping missions: UNMO (UNOMO / Iraq, UNAMID / Darfur, UNMIS / Sudan, UNMISS / Southern Sudan, UNMIBH / Bosnia & Herzegovina, MONUC / Congo), UN Staff (Lebanon, Congo), UN Contingent (Indo Mech Batt / Lebanon, Force Protection Coy / Lebanon, Eng Coy / Congo).

== Weaponry and equipment ==
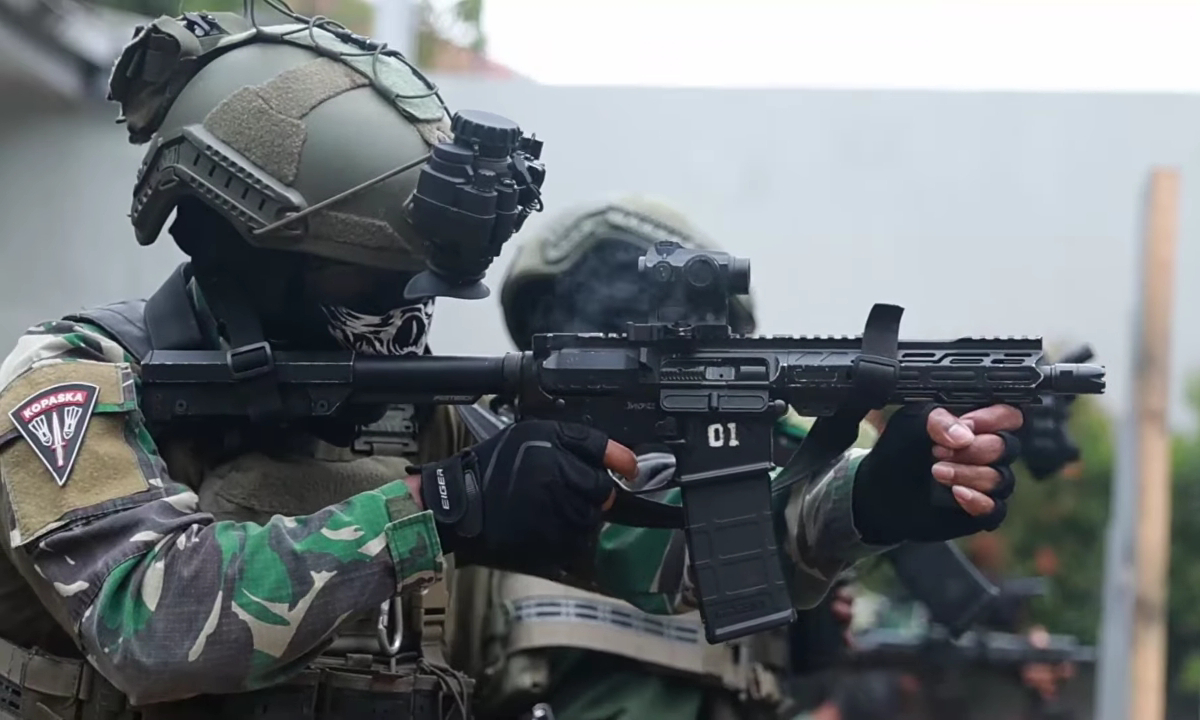
Kopaska operator conducted a live-fire exercise equipped with CMMG Banshee Mk4.

Since most of Kopaska duties are in salty and tropical environments, most of Kopaska's weapons and equipment reflect these conditions.

The type of equipment and weapons used by Kopaska are common in Indonesia and world special force societies, including:

- Pistols: Pindad P1/P2, SIG Sauer P226, Glock 17, Glock 19, H&K USP, CornerShot
- Submachine guns: H&K MP5 variants, Brugger & Thomet MP9 variants, Micro Uzi, Daewoo K7, MP7, CMMG Banshee Mk4
- Assault rifles: Pindad SS1-V1/V2, Pindad SS2-V1/V2, CZ 805 BREN, HK416, M4, Steyr AUG A3 SFO, AK-101, APS underwater rifle, AK-102
- Sniper rifles: SIG 550 Sniper rifle, Steyr-Mannlicher SSG 69, Galatz Sniper Rifle, AW L96, Denel NTW-20, Arctic Sniper, HK417, SR-25
- Machine guns: Ultimax 100, Daewoo K3, FN Minimi, FN MAG, Pindad 12.7 MG's.

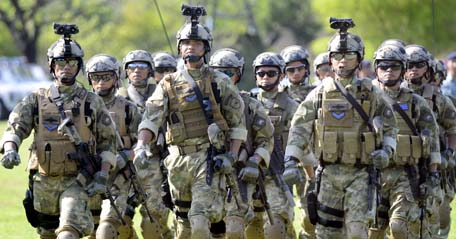
Kopaska special forces of the Indonesian Navy, equipped with M4 carbines

Kopaska use commercial scuba diver equipment. All personnel are also equipped with lightweight PRO-TEC helmets, Level III MICH helmets, and some of them wearing Airframe Helmets and by Crye Precision and FAST Helmets by OpsCore. They use close circuit, semi close circuit and open circuit aqualung equipment, a scooter or sub-skimmer craft for underwater mobility, and an Avon Sea Raider Rigid Inflatable Boat or Hull (By deflating the hull, a Sea Raider can also be used as a sub-skimmer craft). They also have X38 Combat Boat and Sea Shadow.

Kopaska operators use digital camos, first used from 2010, known as the Skull of Frog.

== Role and notable missions ==
Currently, the unit has approximately 300 personnel, divided into two groups. One group is attached to the western fleet, based in Jakarta and the other group is attached to the eastern fleet, based in Surabaya, East Java. When called for, they conduct limited support search and rescue missions. They have also been deployed overseas as part of United Nations peacekeeping missions.

=== Trikora campaign ===
Early plans, included a proposed "human torpedo" campaign. An attack boat was equipped with a MiG-17 "Fresco" ejection seat, powered by a pair of Johnson 100pk and armed with two torpedo warheads. Known as Project Y within Kopaska circles, this project was supervised by Lt. Commander (Navy) Urip Santoso (Vice Adm Ret), one of the founders of Kopaska.

=== MV Sinar Kudus Hostage Rescue ===
On March 16, 2011, an Indonesian merchant ship, MV Sinar Kudus, carrying nickel ore from South Sulawesi to Rotterdam was hijacked by a group of Somali pirates at the coast of Somalia. After some negotiations, the ship owner eventually agreed to pay a ransom and the pirates freed the vessel and its crew. However, upon learning that the ship was carrying valuable minerals, another groups of pirates attempted to re-hijack the ship, and made an aggressive fast approach to retake MV Sinar Kudus. After MV Sinar Kudus signalled "mayday", a group of Kopaska elite soldiers were deployed from KRI Abdul Halim Perdanakusuma to secure the ship. Three fast boats were deployed. But fearing that it may not be quick enough, a group of Kopaska were deployed using Bo 105 helicopter to strafe the oncoming pirates. The remainder of Kopaska on board the boats finished the pirates.

=== Other Missions ===
- Carry out various Special Operations / Intelligence of TNI and Navy
- Conducting Special Operations "Scraper Plow"
- Carrying out Special Operations "Lusitania Expresso"
- Anti-Piracy operations
- Pursuing Pirates in the Malacca Strait, Sunda Strait, Bangka Belitung
- Pursuing Pirates in eastern Indonesia region
- VIP and VVIP Security (Non-Aligned Summit, Bali Democracy Forum etc.)
- Security operations in Ambalat Block - Unarang Corals
- Security operations of Vital Objects such as in national Oil Rigs

== Uniform ==
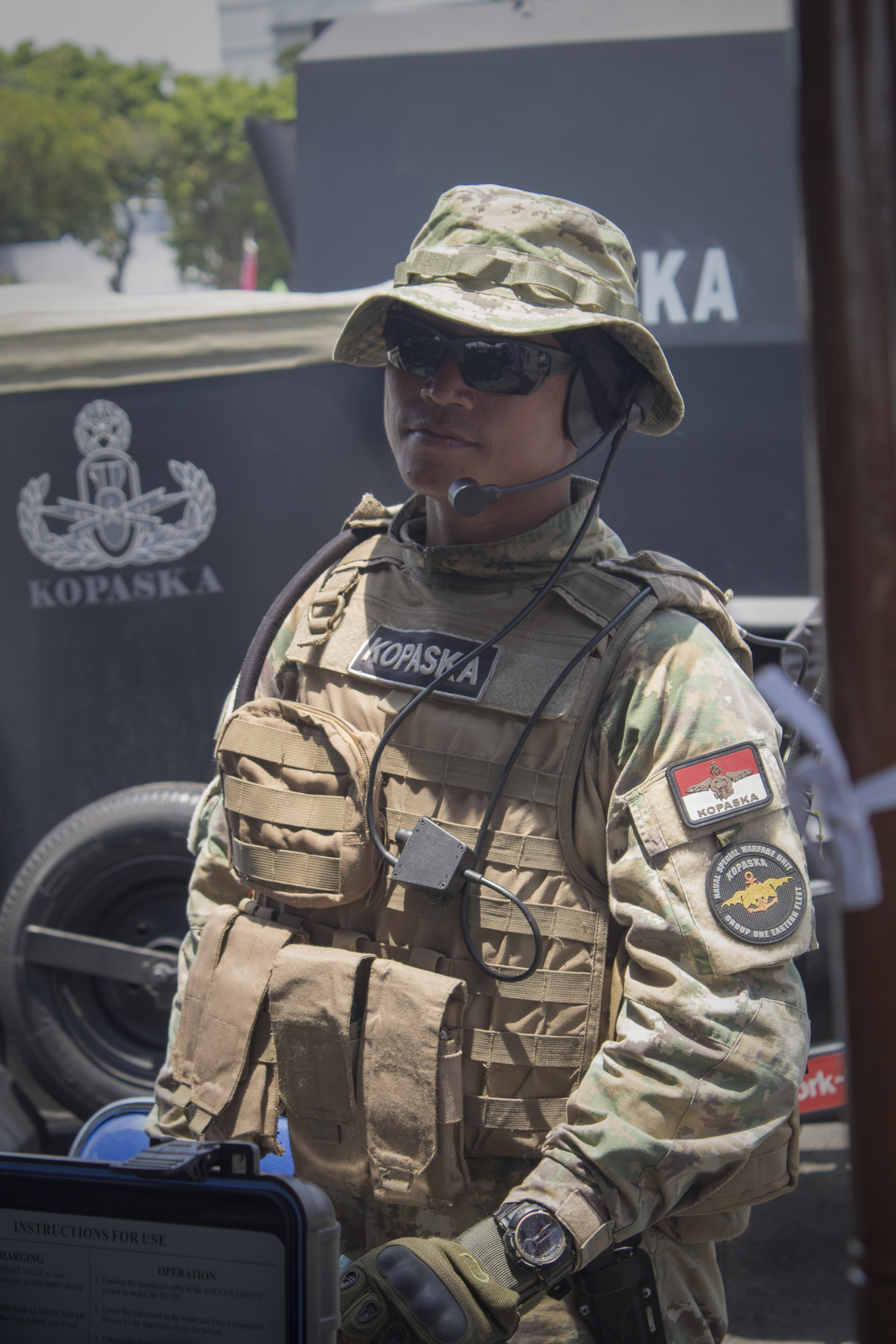
A Kopaska operator

Since 2006, Kopaska have been wearing their own pixelated camouflage design that often called "Kopaska Digital". A second version has also appeared utilizing lighter colors, the second version has a trident or three-pronged harpoon being grasped by a frog incorporated into the pixelated design. Kopaska Digital first appeared is in 2006, the uniform was made by PT. Sritex and designed by PT. Mustika.

== Gallery ==
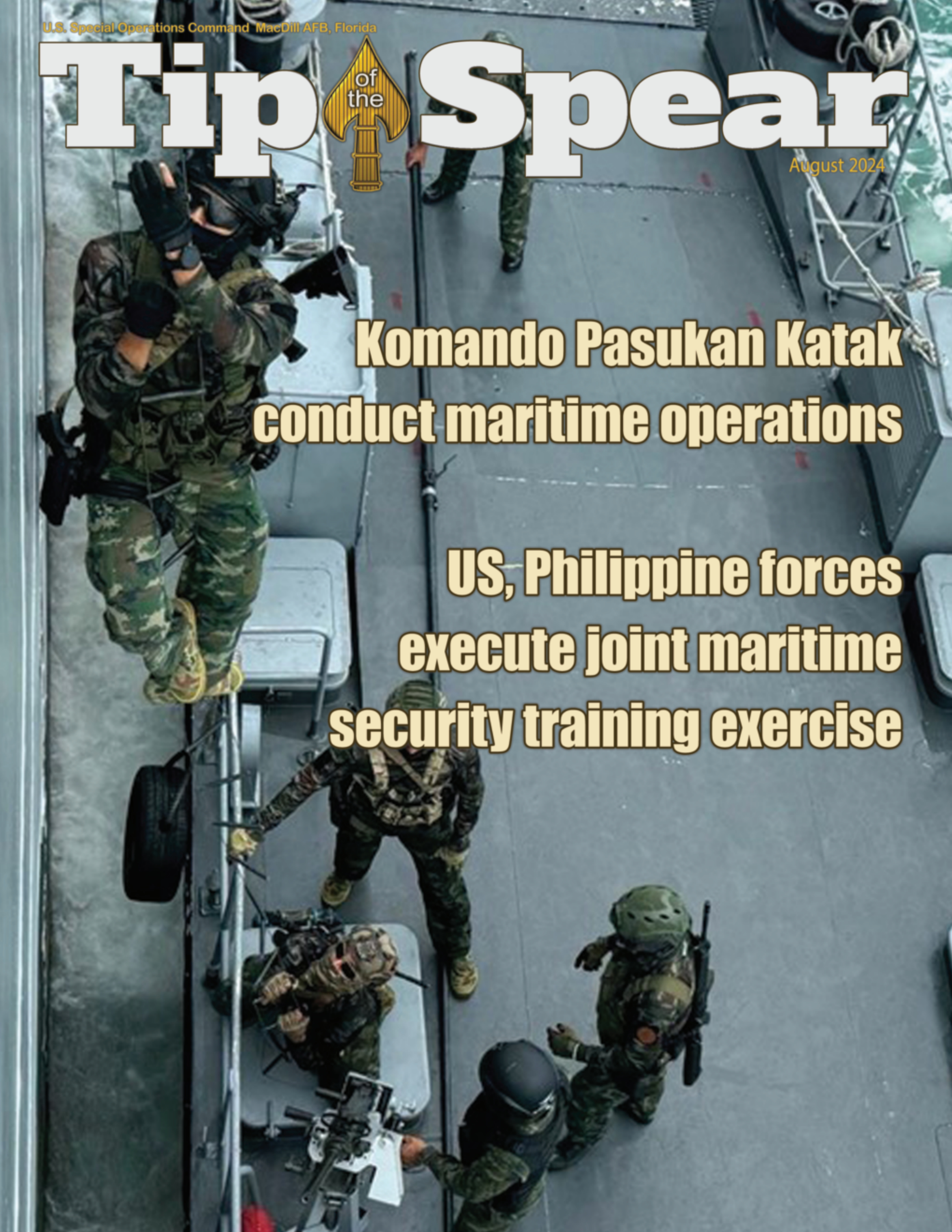
Kopaska in the Tip of the Spear magazine cover, edition August 2024, published by USSOCOM.
