= Nancy Sherman =

- Sherman at Georgetown University, 2019
- Born: 1951 (age 74–75)
- Awards: American Academy of Arts and Sciences (2022); Guggenheim Fellowship (2013)

Education
- Education: Bryn Mawr College (AB); University of Edinburgh (MLitt); Harvard University (PhD)
- Academic advisor: Martha Nussbaum; John Rawls

Philosophical work
- Era: Contemporary philosophy
- Region: Western philosophy
- School: Virtue ethics
- Institutions: Georgetown University, United States Naval Academy, Yale University
- Main interests: Ethics, military ethics, history of moral philosophy, ancient philosophy, moral psychology, emotions, psychoanalysis
- Notable ideas: Moral injury, Stoic resilience, moral psychology of war
- Website: nancysherman.com

Nancy Sherman (born 1951) is an American philosopher and Distinguished University Professor of philosophy at Georgetown University, where she also holds an affiliate appointment with Georgetown Law's Center on National Security and the Law. She works in ethics, military ethics, the history of moral philosophy, ancient philosophy, the emotions, moral psychology, and psychoanalysis. She is the author of seven books, including Feed the Soul: Lessons from Aristotle on Living Well, published by Yale University Press in January 2027; Stoic Wisdom: Ancient Lessons for Modern Resilience (2021); Afterwar: Healing the Moral Wounds of Our Soldiers (2015); and The Untold War (2010), a New York Times Notable Book. Her earlier books are The Fabric of Character: Aristotle's Theory of Virtue (1989) and Making a Necessity of Virtue: Aristotle and Kant on Virtue (1997).

From 1997 to 1999, Sherman served as the inaugural Distinguished Chair in Ethics at the United States Naval Academy. She was elected a fellow of the American Academy of Arts and Sciences in 2022. Sherman is a Guggenheim Fellow and has received many other honors and fellowships for her work.

== Early life and education ==
Sherman earned a BA magna cum laude with honors in philosophy from Bryn Mawr College in 1973. She studied at the University of Edinburgh as a Vans Dunlop Scholar, receiving an MLitt in philosophy in 1976, and in the spring of 1978 she was a Visiting Research Scholar in philosophy and classics at King's College, Cambridge. She received her PhD from Harvard University in 1982, where her doctoral dissertation on ancient philosophy was awarded the George Plympton Adams Prize for the most distinguished thesis in the history of philosophy.

Sherman later completed research training at the Washington Center for Psychoanalysis, where she is a fellow.

== Academic career ==
Sherman joined Yale University as an assistant professor of philosophy in 1982 and was promoted to associate professor in 1988. In 1989, she moved to Georgetown University as a tenured associate professor, was promoted to full professor in 1994, and was named Distinguished University Professor in 2001. She has been an affiliate of the Kennedy Institute of Ethics at Georgetown since 1989, served as an adjunct professor at Georgetown Law from 2004 to 2016, and has held an affiliate appointment with Georgetown Law's Center on National Security and the Law since 2014. She spent a term as visiting professor of philosophy at Johns Hopkins University in 1995 and two terms at the University of Maryland in 1995 and 1996.

From January 1997 to June 1999, Sherman was the inaugural holder of the Distinguished Chair in Ethics at the United States Naval Academy, during which time she advised the Superintendent of the Naval Academy, the Secretary of the Navy, the Commandant of the Marine Corps, and the Commander of Naval Education and Training on ethics.

Sherman has served in a variety of posts in the American Philosophical Association and other professional organizations.

In 2005, she was invited by the Assistant Secretary of Defense for Health Affairs to visit Guantanamo Bay detention camp to witness the conditions detainees were being held in, and to provide ethical advice as to their continued treatment. She also acted as an observer to the Vice Chief of the Army's Suicide Review Board in 2011.

== Research ==
Sherman has published over seventy peer-reviewed articles in ethics, the history of philosophy, ancient ethics, moral psychology, the emotions, and psychoanalysis.

=== Ancient ethics and virtue ===
Sherman's early work focused on Aristotle's ethics and the broader tradition of virtue ethics. Her first book, The Fabric of Character: Aristotle's Theory of Virtue (1989), examines Aristotle's account of the development and structure of moral character. Making a Necessity of Virtue: Aristotle and Kant on Virtue (1997) argues that the ethical theories of Aristotle and Immanuel Kant are more compatible than is traditionally supposed, and that emotional engagement plays an essential role in Kantian moral life. She is also the editor of Critical Essays on the Classics: Aristotle's Ethics (1999).

=== Military ethics and the moral psychology of war ===
Beginning with her tenure at the Naval Academy, Sherman developed a sustained body of work on the moral and psychological experience of soldiers, focusing on issues including post-traumatic stress disorder, military suicide, and the honor, guilt, and shame associated with war captured by the concept of moral injury.

In Stoic Warriors: The Ancient Philosophy Behind the Military Mind (2005), Sherman writes about courage and the use of emotions from a soldier's point of view. She asserts that soldiers returning home often receive insufficient care, leaving them ill-prepared for non-violent civilian life. She compares the dysfunctional anger shown by some soldiers after they come home to the anger that may be functional on the battlefield as a way of summoning courage. Though the relationship of anger to courage may be deemed controversial to Stoic views of the perfect warrior, Sherman sees this as a relationship in displaying courage, since soldiers must suppress their anger, fear, and other battlefield emotions, inducing a disorder that releases these emotions after a battle, in non-violent situations. Sherman has argued that ancient theories of stoicism may be modified and helpfully applied to the modern world and the modern soldier. Her conclusions have been criticized on the basis that such applications may be actively counterproductive.

The Untold War: Inside the Hearts, Minds, and Souls of Our Soldiers (2010), based on interviews with more than forty service members, was named a New York Times Notable Book and Editors' Choice for 2010, and was selected by the United States Air Force Academy faculty as the outstanding recent book in the humanities on war.

Afterwar: Healing the Moral Wounds of Our Soldiers (2015) explores questions of moral injury and healing in war. The moral dimensions of returning soldiers' psychological injuries—guilt, shame, and feeling responsible for doing wrong or being wronged—are often ignored and elude conventional treatment. The book considers how returning veterans and the civilian communities to which they return can engage in moral repair.

=== Stoicism and resilience ===
In Stoic Wisdom: Ancient Lessons for Modern Resilience (2021), Sherman argues for a credible modern Stoicism based on ancient Greek and Roman texts. She makes the case that Stoicism is not a philosophy of acquiescence or retreat, but a practical philosophy of engagement in the world that requires cultivated emotions and a commitment to the common good. In a talk for House of SpeakEasy's Seriously Entertaining program, Sherman said, "Stoic philosophy sort of captured, I think terrifically by Seneca, who says, at the very end of On Anger, this wonderful treatise, he says, 'Let us cultivate humanity.' And essentially, that's the rallying call for it, for this idea of the Stoics, are worth reading, it's because they exhort us to rise to our fullest potential through reason, cooperation, and, you know, and a sense of selflessness when it's required." Stoic Wisdom has been translated into German, simplified Chinese, Japanese, and Korean.

Sherman's forthcoming book, Feed the Soul: Lessons from Aristotle on Living Well, is scheduled for release by Yale University Press in January 2027. Early praise has been generous, as in these reviews: "A lovely, amazing book, packed with insights. Aristotle emerges not as the usual remote pedant but as a curious and gracious friend who accompanies the reader as he studies animals, reacts to tragic performances and athletic contests, and engages us throughout in pondering the difficulty and joy of living well."—Martha C. Nussbaum, Justice for Animals.

== Publications ==
=== Books ===
- Feed the Soul: Lessons from Aristotle on Living Well. New Haven: Yale University Press, forthcoming January 2027.
- Stoic Wisdom: Ancient Lessons for Modern Resilience. New York: Oxford University Press, 2021.
- Afterwar: Healing the Moral Wounds of Our Soldiers. New York: Oxford University Press, 2015.
- The Untold War: Inside the Hearts, Minds, and Souls of Our Soldiers. New York: W. W. Norton, 2010.
- Stoic Warriors: The Ancient Philosophy Behind the Military Mind. New York: Oxford University Press, 2005.
- Making a Necessity of Virtue: Aristotle and Kant on Virtue. Cambridge: Cambridge University Press, 1997.
- The Fabric of Character: Aristotle's Theory of Virtue. Oxford: Clarendon Press, 1989.

=== Edited volumes ===
- Critical Essays on the Classics: Aristotle's Ethics (editor). Lanham, MD: Rowman & Littlefield, 1999.
- Ethics for Military Leaders, Vols. 1 and 2 (co-editor, with A. Donovan, D. Johnson, G. Lucas, Jr., and P. Roush). American Heritage Custom Publishing, 1997.
