= Suhartono =

Lieutenant general Suhartono
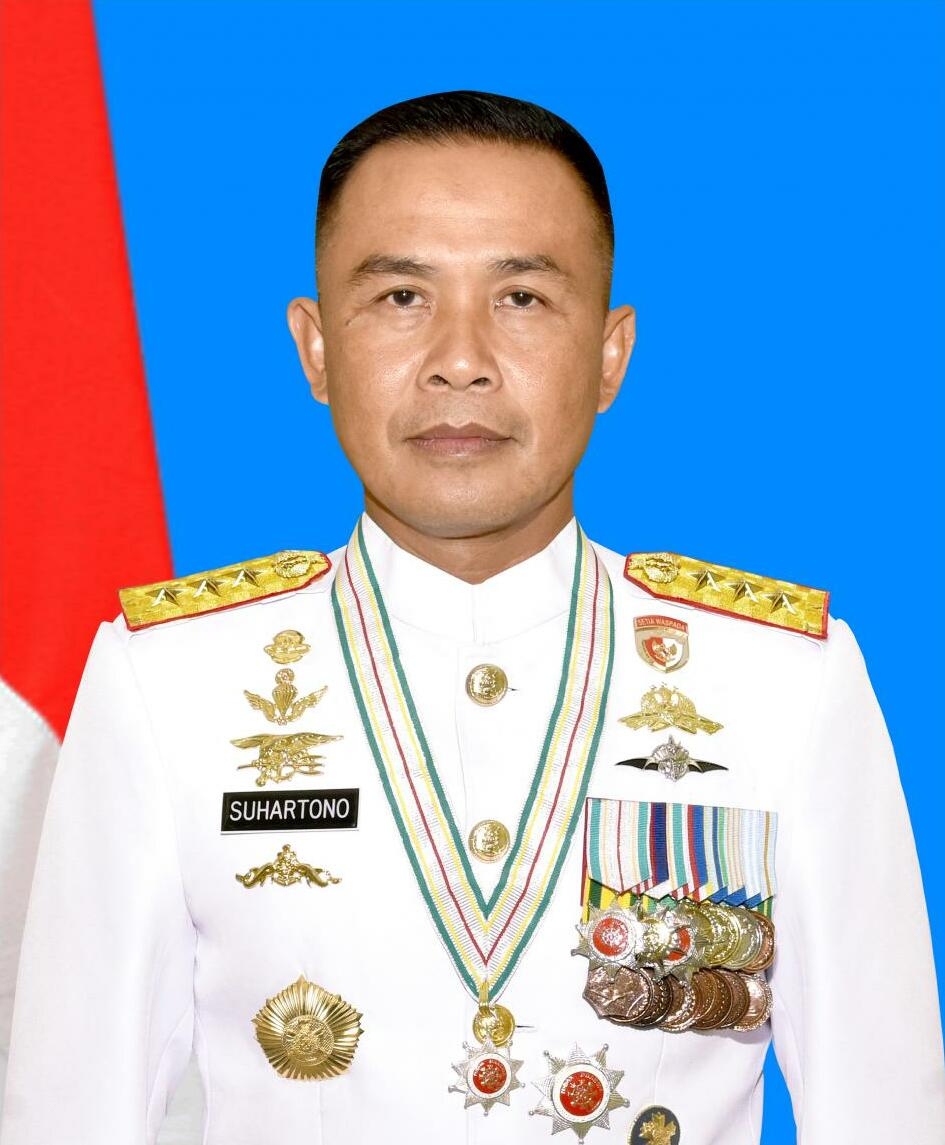

Commander of Naval Doctrine, Education, and Training Development Command
- In office 21 January 2022 – 29 September 2023
- Preceded by: Nurhidayat
- Succeeded by: Nur Alamsyah

Commandant of the Marine Corps
- In office 29 November 2018 – 21 January 2022
- Preceded by: Bambang Suswantono
- Succeeded by: Widodo Dwi Purwanto

Personal details
- Born: 15 April 1966 (age 60) Batang Regency, Central Java, Indonesia

Military service
- Allegiance: Indonesia
- Branch/service: Indonesian Marine Corps
- Years of service: 1988–present
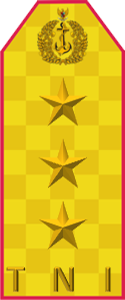
- Rank: Lieutenant general

Lieutenant General Suhartono (born 15 April 1966) is a senior officer of the Indonesian Navy who graduated from the Indonesian Naval Academy in 1988. Previously, he is the 48th Commander of the Naval Doctrine, Education and Training Development Command (Kodiklat). Previously, he was the Commandant of the Marine Corps. and also served as Commander of Paspampres, Commander of Lantamal XI/Merauke, Naval Academy Regiment, Asrena Kormar and Expert Staff at Koarmabar.
