= Head of National Search and Rescue Agency =

The Head of the National Search and Rescue Agency (abbreviated as Head of BNPP, also called Kabasarnas) is the highest-ranking official of the non-ministerial government agency, the National Search and Rescue Agency.

No.	Picture	Chief of National Search and Rescue Agency	Took office	Left office	Defence branch	Ref.
1	Dono Indarto	Air Marshal (Ret.); Dono Indarto	1972	1987	Indonesian Air Force	
2	Hasari Hasanudin	Air Marshal (Ret.); Hasari Hasanudin	1987	1991	Indonesian Air Force	
3	Harinto	Rear Admiral (Ret.); Harinto	1992	1998	Indonesian Navy	
4	Setio Rahardjo	Rear Admiral (Ret.); Setio Rahardjo	1998	2003	Indonesian Navy	
5	Yayun Riyanto	Rear Admiral (Ret.); Yayun Riyanto	2003	24 November 2006	Indonesian Navy	
6	Bambang Karnoyudho	Rear Admiral (Ret.); Bambang Karnoyudho	24 November 2006	15 October 2008	Indonesian Navy	
7	Ida Bagus Sanubari	Air Marshal (Ret.); Ida Bagus Sanubari	15 October 2008	11 August 2010	Indonesian Air Force	
8	Wardjoko	Air Marshal (Ret.); Wardjoko	11 August 2010	21 December 2010	Indonesian Air Force	
9	Nono Sampono	Lieutenant General (Ret.); Nono Sampono	21 December 2010	1 August 2011	Indonesian Marine Corps	
10	Daryatmo	Air Marshal (Ret.); Daryatmo	1 August 2011	15 August 2012	Indonesian Air Force	
11	Muhammad Alfan Baharudin	Lieutenant General (Ret.); Muhammad Alfan Baharudin	15 August 2012	14 April 2014	Indonesian Marine Corps	
12	Felicianus Henry Bambang Sulistyo	Air Marshal (Ret.); Felicianus Henry Bambang Sulistyo	14 April 2014	1 February 2017	Indonesian Air Force	
13	Muhammad Syaugi (id)	Air Marshal (Ret.); Muhammad Syaugi (id)	1 February 2017	30 January 2019	Indonesian Air Force	
14	Bagus Puruhito (id)	Air Marshal (Ret.); Bagus Puruhito (id)	30 January 2019	4 February 2021	Indonesian Air Force	
15	Henri Alfiandi (id)	Air Marshal; Henri Alfiandi (id)	4 February 2021	17 July 2023	Indonesian Air Force	
16	Kusworo (id)	Air Marshal; Kusworo (id)	17 July 2023	21 February 2025	Indonesian Air Force	
17	Muhammad Syafii (id)	Air Marshal; Muhammad Syafii (id)	21 February 2025	present	Indonesian Air Force	
