= Commandant of the Marine Corps =

Commandant of the Marine Corps may refer to:

- Commandant of the Marine Corps (Indonesia)
- Commandant of the Netherlands Marine Corps
- Commandant of the Philippine Marine Corps
- Commandant of the Republic of Korea Marine Corps
- Commandant of the United States Marine Corps
