= Indonesian National Armed Forces Day =

National commemorative day in Indonesia

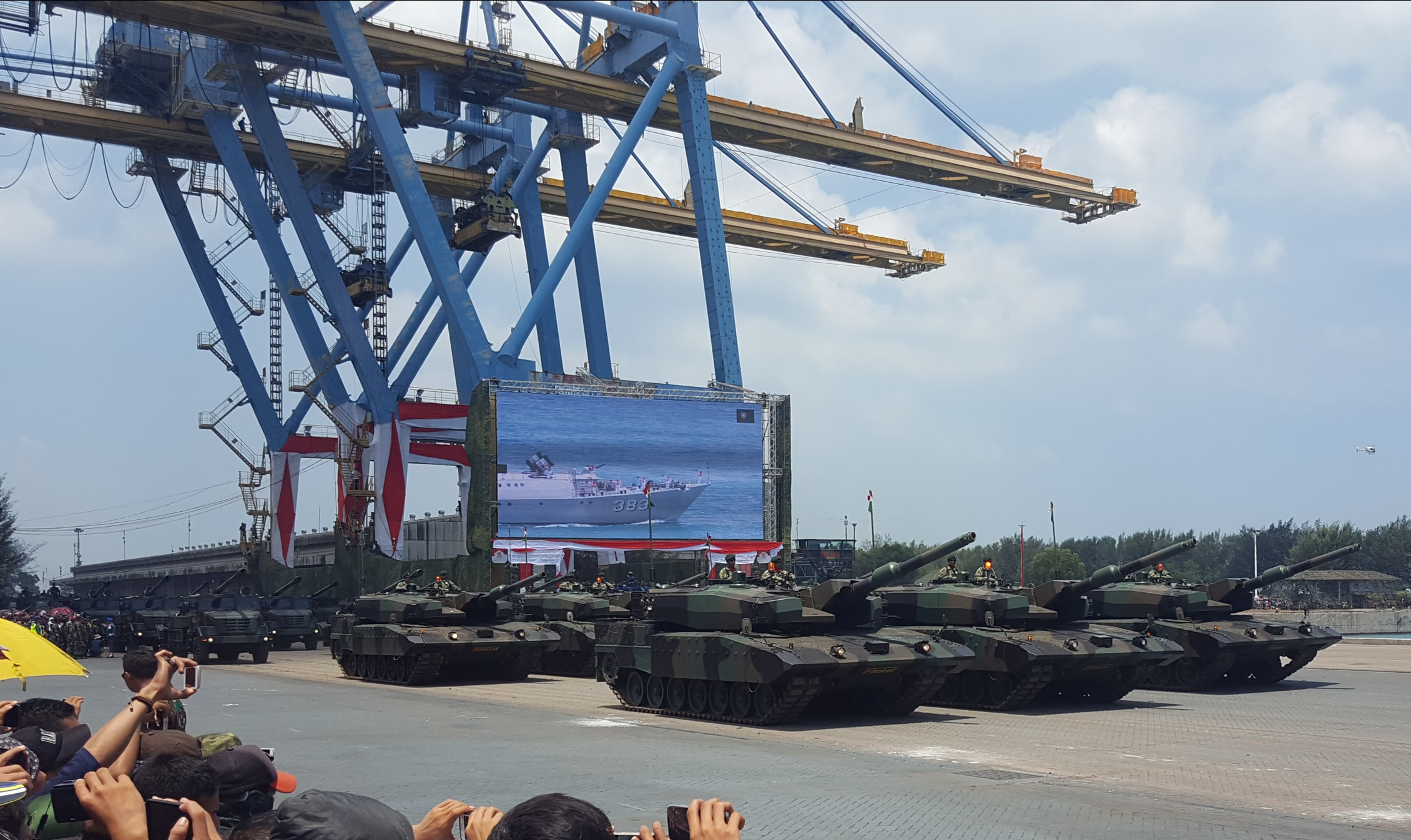
Indonesian Army Leopard tanks on parade during the Indonesian National Armed Forces Day ceremony 2017

The Indonesian National Armed Forces Day (Hari Tentara Nasional Indonesia, formerly Hari Angkatan Perang RI/Angkatan Bersenjata RI) abbreviated HUT TNI is a national day of Indonesia that is celebrated on 5 October, the day of foundation of the Tentara Keamanan Rakyat (People's Security Armed Forces), the predecessor of the TNI, in 1945, itself a replacement for the Badan Keamanan Rakyat (People's Security Bureau) established on 29 August the same year. Military parades, fun games, concerts and other events are held nationwide in major cities and provincial capitals in honor of the INAF's serving men and women and military veterans.

== History of Armed Forces Day ==
The date of October 5 was chosen for the National Armed Forces Day in honor of the 1945 establishment of Southeast Asia's 5th oldest regular and standing armed forces per a government decree of the nascent Republic. The first ever parades, albeit in wartime conditions of the Indonesian National Revolution, was held in Yogyakarta in 1946, no parades were held in 1948 while a victory parade was held in 1949 in lieu of the anniversary parade, owing to the conclusion of military operations. It would be only in 1950 when the first regular parade was held in Jakarta, the national capital, to celebrate the 5th year of the armed forces and the adoption of the unitary status of the young country and they have been held annually ever since (with a break in 1965, when due to the aftermath of the events of the 30 September Movement a few days before the 20th Armed Forces Day, it was cancelled at the last minute but was made up the day after, parades were also not held in 1997, 1998, 2016, 2018 and 2020). From 1961 to 1998 the Indonesian National Police, as the then 4th branch of the armed forces, joined the parades, and flypasts have been held since 1951. The national parade's guest of honor is the President of Indonesia in his/her capacity as Commander in Chief of the National Armed Forces. While in Jakarta the parade has been held at the Halim Perdanakusuma AFB and formerly at the Gelora Bung Karno Sports Complex and the DPR/MPR Building complex.

Since 2014, to place emphasis on the role of the armed forces in the modern era and in the modernization and expansion of its combat units the holiday parades have now been held outside of the capital and have also included a fleet review.

=== History of the celebrations since 1959 ===
- 1959 - First parade to feature Soviet made jet aircraft (MiG-17s and MiG-19s)
- 1962 - First parade on television and to feature a drivepast of the S-75 Dvina SAM system
- 1963 - First to feature combat helicopters and female armed forces personnel
- 1967 - 22nd anniversary, Suharto's first parade as President
- 1970 - 25th anniversary (silver jubilee)
- 1975 - 30th anniversary (pearl jubilee)
- 1979 - First parade to be broadcast in color television
- 1980 - 35th anniversary, First parade to be broadcast via satellite nationwide
- 1985 - 40th anniversary (Ruby jubilee)
- 1990 - 45th anniversary (sapphire jubilee), first parade also to be broadcast on private television stations aside from TVRI
- 1995 - 50th anniversary (Golden Jubilee), first parade to be broadcast on cable television
- 2005 - 60th anniversary
- 2010 - 65th anniversary (Blue sapphire jubilee)
- 2014 - 69th anniversary, first parade to be held outside of Jakarta since 1980
- 2015 - 70th anniversary
- 2017 - 72nd anniversary, First parade to be broadcast in digital high definition
- 2018 - 73rd anniversary, Simple Ceremony to honor those 2018 Sulawesi earthquake and tsunami victims
- 2019 - 74th anniversary, Parade included Indonesia's UN Forces, Garuda Contingent
- 2020 - 75th anniversary (diamond jubilee), simple ceremony and remote broadcasts to honor the Indonesian victims of the COVID-19 pandemic and in gratitude of the services rendered by the INAF's medical servicemen and women
- 2021 - 76th anniversary, outdoor ceremony and remote broadcasts to honor the Indonesian victims of the COVID-19 pandemic and in gratitude of the services rendered by the INAF's medical servicemen and women followed by the return of the flypast and parade
- 2022 - 77th anniversary, outdoor ceremony and small parade and flypast in Jakarta
- 2023 - 78th anniversary, return to full parade in Merdeka Square with the largest ever mobile column yet in the capital

== Expanded summary ==
As Armed Forces Day is the national armed forces holiday of Indonesia the celebrations in Jakarta or other major cities thus serve as a national event to mark the holiday. The celebrations begin as the parade commander (The commander is, in recent years, as in the case in 2015 and 2017, been led by a Lieutenant General/Vice Admiral/Air Marshal, usually the commanding general of Kostrad) arrives to take his place in the parade formation. The parade first renders honors to the Tri-Service Colour Guard (Pasukan Penjaga Lambang-Lambang Kesatuan) as the Paspampres Presidential Band plays honors music, if a massed colour guard unit is present the honors are the same.

At 10:00 am the President and Vice President arrive together with the Minister of Defense in the dais, where they are received by the Commander of the Armed Forces. The parade then first salutes as the band plays Indonesia Raya, and then to the President as arrival honors are rendered. The PC then informs him/her of the commencement of the parade and ceremony and the readiness of the formations for the review. The president, riding in an open-top Land Rover, then inspects the formations with the PC and as the review ends, leaves the vehicle and returns to the dais, where he/she orders a minute of silence (mengheningkan cipta) in honor of all armed forces personnel who were killed in action and to deceased veterans of the armed services. When the band stops playing the Sapta Marga (Armed Forces Pledge) is recited in a rededication service, wherein 3 select officers renew the pledge on behalf of all servicing men and women of the armed forces. Afterwards, before the President would make the holiday address, he/she first awards 3 armed forces personnel with the following decorations, each per service branch, for merit and dedicated service to the nation and people in the armed forces:

- Bintang Kartika Eka Paksi ("Army Meritorious Service Star")
- Bintang Jalasena ("Navy Meritorious Service Star")
- Bintang Swa Bhuwana Paksa ("Air Force Meritorious Service Star")

Andika Bhayangkari is played after the address by the band, and this is followed by the PC receiving permission from the President to march off the parade in preparation for the march past later on, the departure honors then follow.

=== Order of the parade in order of inspection by the President ===
==== Military bands in attendance ====
- TNI Music Corps

==== Ground march past column ====
- Combined Field Music Unit of the National Armed Forces Academies System
  - Military Academy Canka Lokananta Corps of Drums
  - Naval Academy Gita Jala Taruna Drum and Bugle Corps
  - Air Force Academy Gita Dirgantara Drum and Bugle Corps
- Tri-service Color Guard
- Massed color guard
- Joint Services brigade
  - Officers contingent
  - Armed Forces Staff Colleges
  - Women's contingent
  - Joint Service Military Police Command
  - Presidential Security Force (Paspampres)
  - Garuda Contingent
- Corps of Cadets, National Armed Forces Academies System
  - Military Academy
  - Naval Academy
  - Air Force Academy
- Army
  - Special Force Command (Kopassus)
  - Army Strategic Command (Kostrad)
  - Army Raider Infantry Battalions
  - Army Infantry Battalions
  - Territorial Reserve
- Navy
  - Marine Corps
  - Navy Frogmen Command (Kopaska)
  - 1st Fleet Command
  - 2nd Fleet Command
  - 3rd Fleet Command
  - Military Sealift Command
- Air Force
  - Two battalions of airmen (one in flight suits and one in combat uniforms)
  - Air Force Infantry (Kopasgat)
  - Air defense and base security
- Veterans contingent
- Civil service contingent
- Civil defense contingent (Firefighters, Maritime Security Agency)
- Reserve and uniformed cadets contingent

== See also ==
- Indonesian National Armed Forces
- Armed Forces Day
