= Commander of the Marine Corps (Indonesia) =

Highest position of the Indonesian Marine Corps

- Panglima Korps Marinir
- Insignia of the Marine Corps

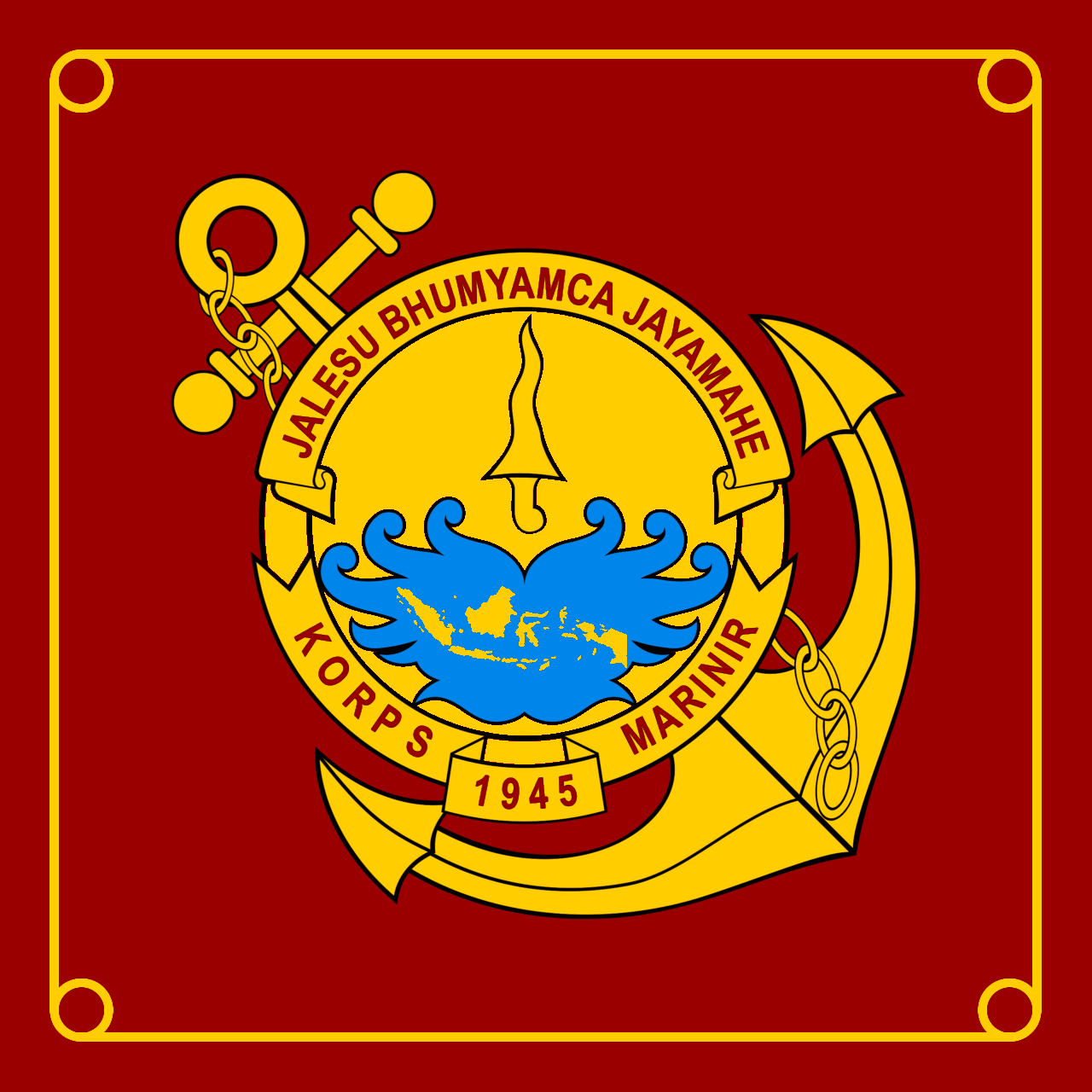
- Flag of the Marine Corps

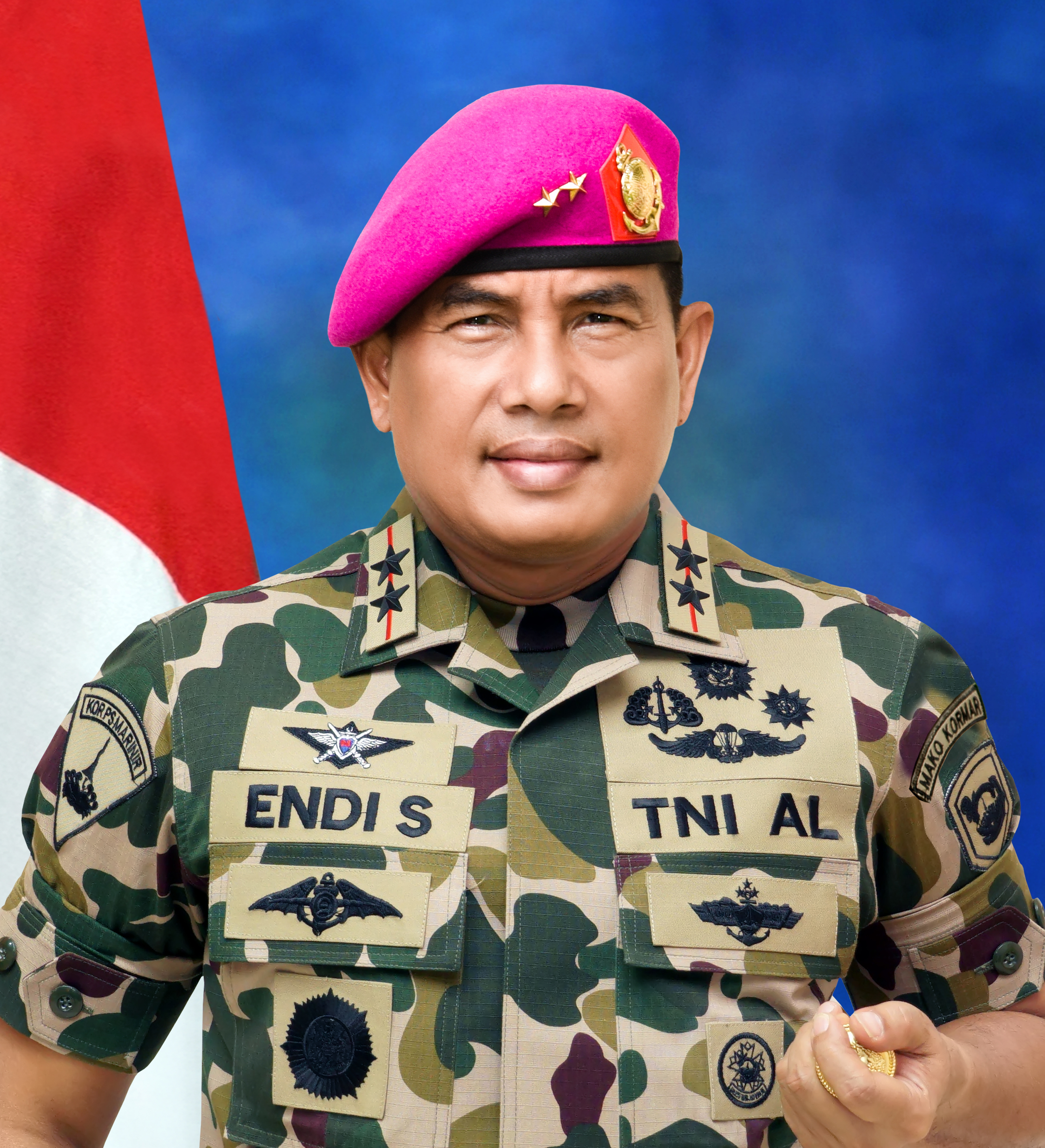
- Incumbent; Lieutenant General (Mar) Endi Supardi since 2 October 2023
- Indonesian Navy
- Style: Pangkormar
- Reports to: Chief of Staff of the Indonesian Navy
- Residence: Rumah Dinas Dakormar, Cilandak - Jakarta
- Seat: Marine Corps Headquarters, Senen - Jakarta
- Formation: 15 November 1945
- First holder: Rear Admiral Agoes Soebekti
- Deputy: Brigadier General (Marine Corps) Muhammad Nadir
- Website: marinir.tnial.mil.id/pimpinan

The Commander of the Marine Corps (Indonesian: Panglima Korps Marinir, abbreviated as Pangkormar) is the highest position of Indonesian Marine Corps. The Indonesian Marine Corps is an integral component of the Navy (TNI-AL), with personnel development being the responsibility of the Chief of Staff of the Indonesian Navy.

The Commander of the Marine Corps reports directly to the Commander of the Indonesian National Armed Forces. The Commander also holds the highest rank within the Marine Corps, which is Lieutenant General. Assisting the Commander of the Marine Corps is the Deputy Commander of the Marine Corps, who holds the rank of two-star marine general.

The position was formerly known as Commandant of the Marine Corps (Indonesian: Komandan Korps Marinir, abbreviated as Dankormar), with the position being held by a Marine Major General, which was previously the highest rank within the Marine Corps. However, promotion to higher ranks was possible if appointed to positions within the Navy or the National Armed Forces Headquarters requiring a three-star rank or higher. The nomenclature was officially changed to Panglima Korps Marinir on 6 August 2025 and was inaugurated on 10 August, with the incumbent Commandant, Endi Supardi, promoted to a lieutenant general.

== List of Commander of the Marine Corps ==
List of Indonesian Marine Corps Commanders
No	Portrait	Rank	Name	From	Until	Remarks
Commandant of Corps Marinier
1		Rear Admiral	Agoes Soebekti	15 November 1945	21 Juli 1947	
-		Major	Achmad Djatmika Legawa	January 1947	February 1947	Acting Commander
Commander of KKO-AL
2		Major General KKO	R. Soehadi	February 1947	5 November 1961	
3		Lieutenant General KKO	Hartono	5 November 1961	16 October 1968	
4		Lieutenant General KKO	Moekijat	16 October 1968	6 December 1971	
Commandant of Korps Marinir Organizational Validation and Change of KKO to Korps Marinir ⭐⭐
5		Major General	H. Moh. Anwar	6 December 1971	15 July 1977	
6		Lieutenant General (Mar)	Kahpi Suriadiredja	15 July 1977	1 May 1983	
7		Brigadier General (Mar)	Muntaram	1 May 1983	January 1987	
8		Brigadier General (Mar)	Aminullah Ibrahim	January 1987	August 1990	
9		Major General (Mar)	Baroto Sardadi	August 1990	November 1992	
10		Major General (Mar)	Gafur Chaliq	December 1992	April 1994	
11		Major General (Mar)	Djoko Pramono	April 1994	February 1996	
12		Major General (Mar)	Suharto	February 1996	1999	
13		Major General (Mar)	Harry Triono	1999	20 November 2002	
14		Major General (Mar)	Achmad Rifai	20 November 2002	9 November 2004	
15		Major General (Mar)	Safzen Noerdin	9 November 2004	6 June 2007	
16		Major General (Mar)	Nono Sampono	6 June 2007	18 October 2008	
17		Major General (Mar)	Djunaidi Djahri	18 October 2008	3 September 2009	
18		Major General (Mar)	Alfan Baharudin	3 September 2009	12 September 2012	
19		Major General (Mar)	Achmad Faridz Washington	12 September 2012	30 March 2015	
20		Major General (Mar)	Buyung Lalana	30 March 2015	15 June 2016	
21		Major General (Mar)	R.M. Trusono	15 June 2016	23 February 2017	
22		Major General (Mar)	Bambang Suswantono	23 February 2017	29 November 2018	Previously commanded the Presidential Security Force (Paspampres)
23		Major General (Mar)	Suhartono	29 November 2018	7 February 2022	Previously commanded the Presidential Security Force (Paspampres)
24		Major General (Mar)	Widodo Dwi Purwanto	7 February 2022	14 May 2023	
25		Major General (Mar)	Nur Alamsyah	14 May 2023	2 October 2023	
26		Major General (Mar)	Endi Supardi	2 October 2023	10 August 2025	
Commander of Korps Marinir Nomenclatural change from Komandan to Panglima ⭐⭐⭐
26		Lieutenant General (Mar)	Endi Supardi	10 August 2025	Present	

== See also ==
- Indonesian National Armed Forces
- Indonesian Navy
