= Indonesian Marine Corps =

Branch of the Indonesian Navy

Marine Corps of the Republic of Indonesia
- Korps Marinir Republik Indonesia
- Emblem of the Indonesian Marine Corps
- Founded: 15 November 1945; 80 years ago
- Country: Indonesia
- Branch: Indonesian Navy
- Type: Marines
- Role: Marine combined arms Amphibious warfare Rapid deployment force
- Size: 27,000
- Part of: Indonesian National Armed Forces
- Headquarters: Kwitang, Jakarta
- Nicknames: Hantu Laut (Ghost of the Sea); Baret Ungu (Purple Berets)
- Mottos: Jalesu Bhumyamca Jayamahe (Sanskrit, lit. 'Glorious on the Land and Sea')
- Beret color: Reddish purple
- March: Mars Korps Marinir
- Anniversaries: 15 November
- Engagements: Indonesian National Revolution; Darul Islam rebellion; Operation Gunung Gede; Operation Indra; Operation Alugoro; Battle against Permesta and PRRI rebellions; Invasion of Ambon; Operation Trikora; Papua conflict; Indonesia-Malaysia confrontation; Operation Seroja; Insurgency in Aceh; Maluku sectarian conflict (1999–2000); MV Sinar Kudus hijacking; Operation Madago Raya (2016–2022)
- Website: marinir.tnial.mil.id

Commanders
- Commander of the Marine Corps: Lieutenant General (Marine) Endi Supardi
- Deputy Commander of the Marine Corps: Major General (Marine) Muhammad Nadir
- Inspector of the Marine Corps: Brigadier General (Marine) Ahmad Fajar
- Coordinator of the Marine Corps Advisory Staff: Brigadier General (Marine) Sandy Muchjidin Latief

Insignia
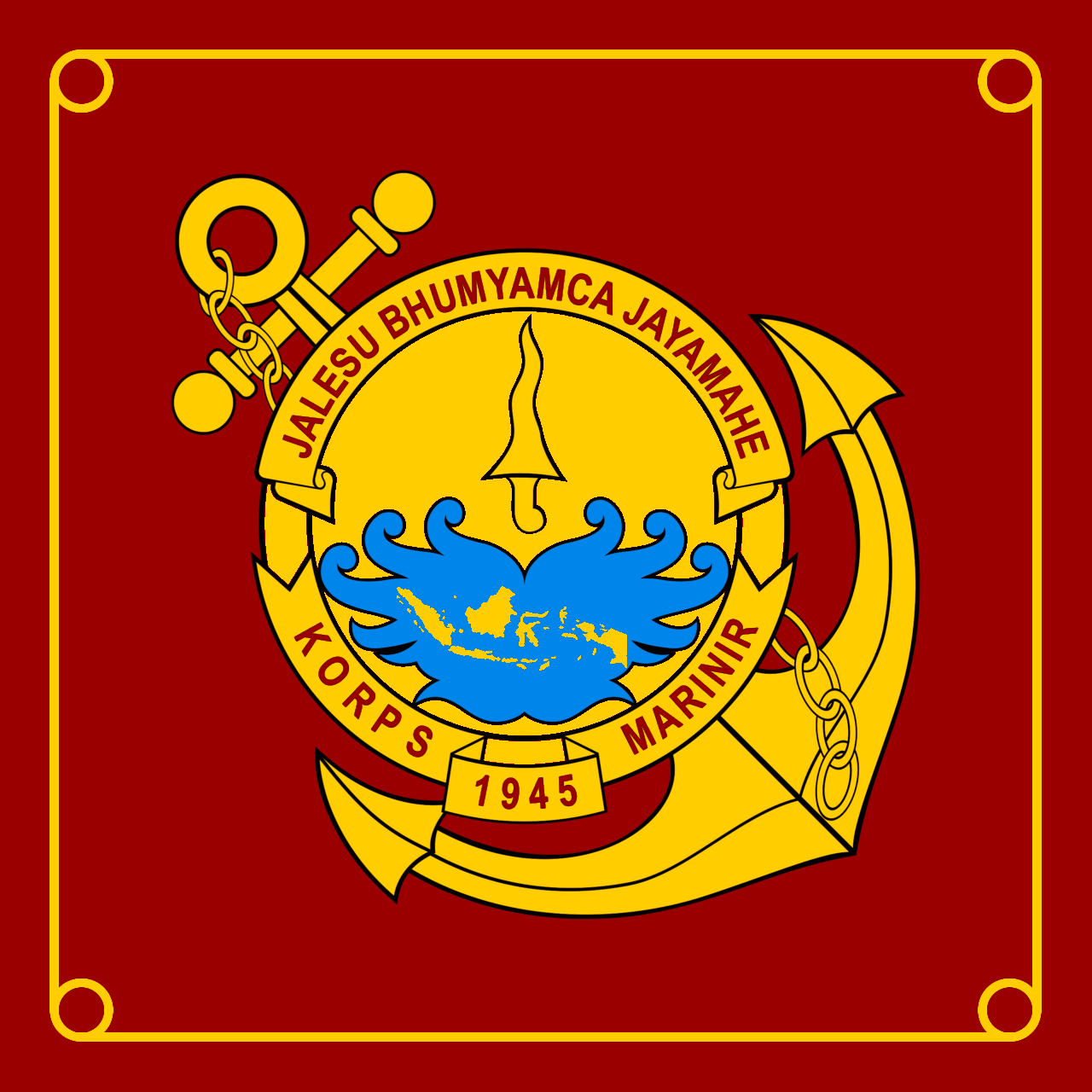
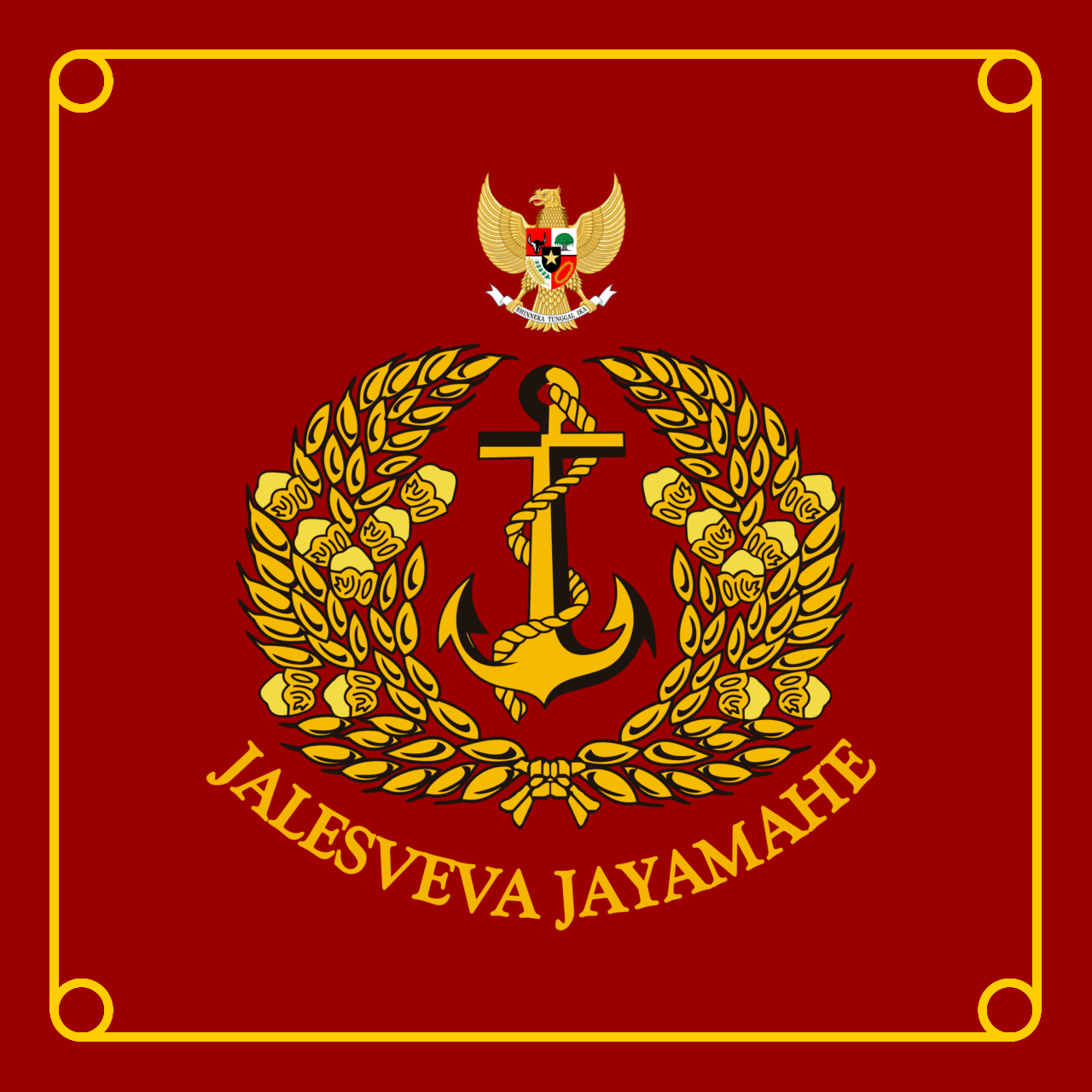
- Colour

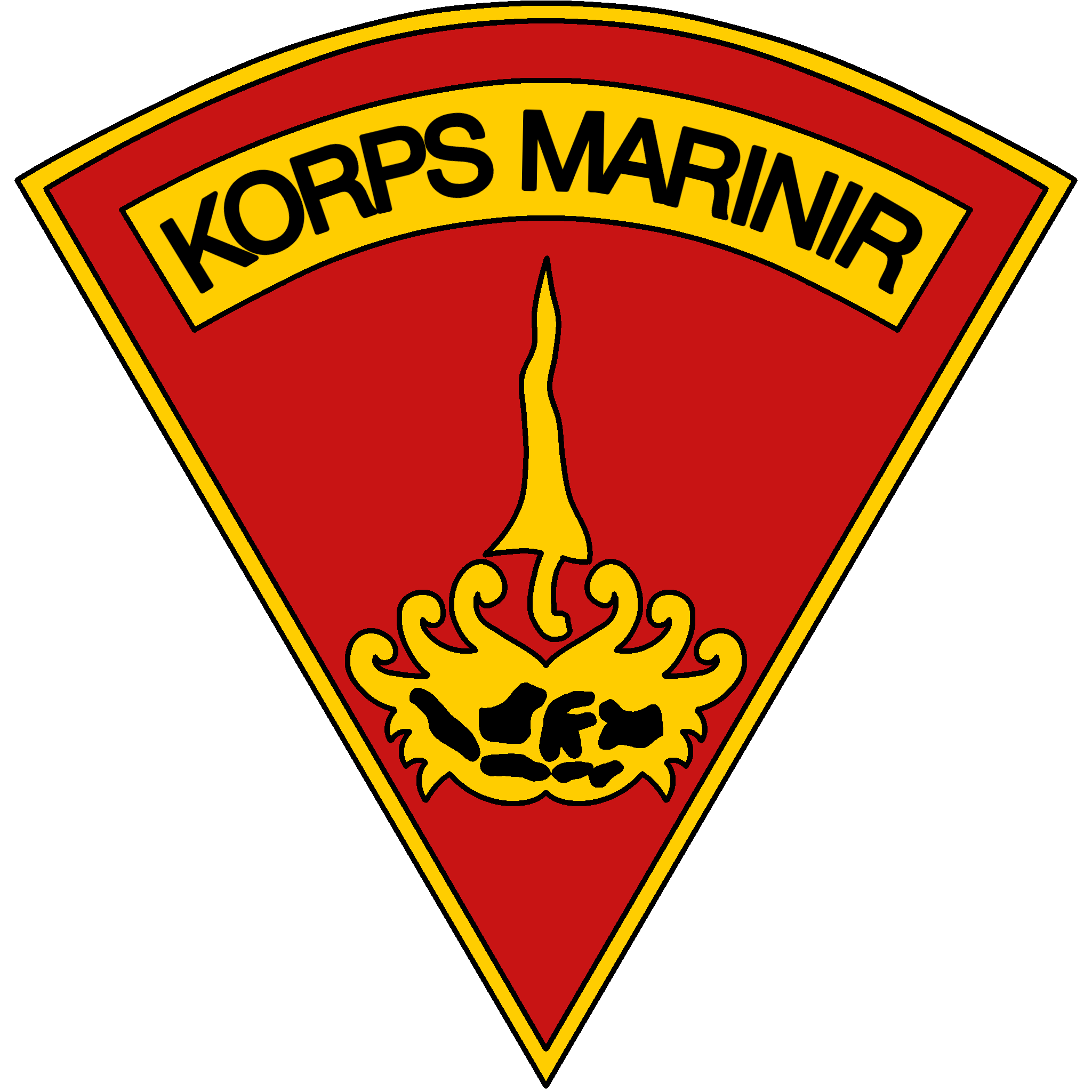
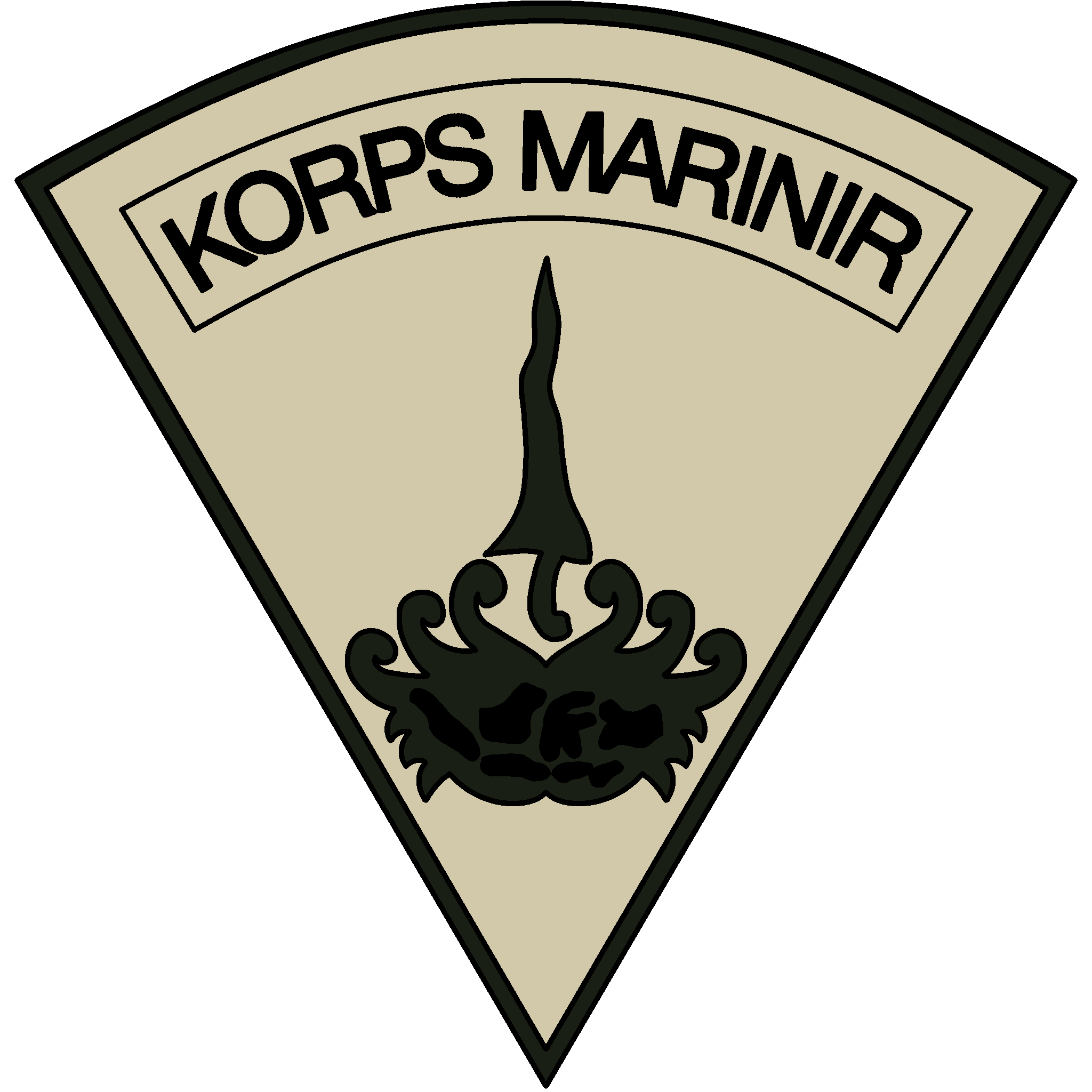
- Patch

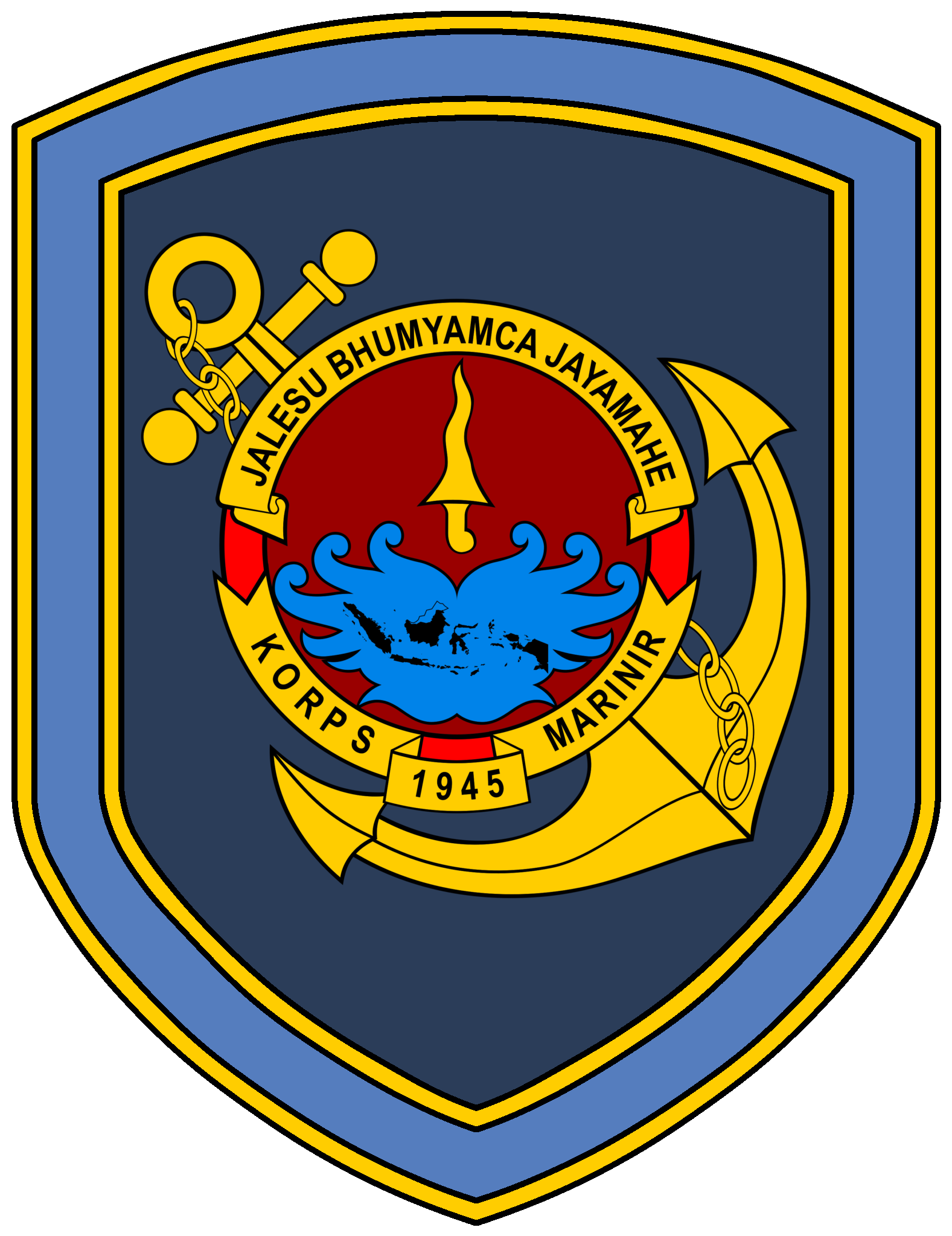
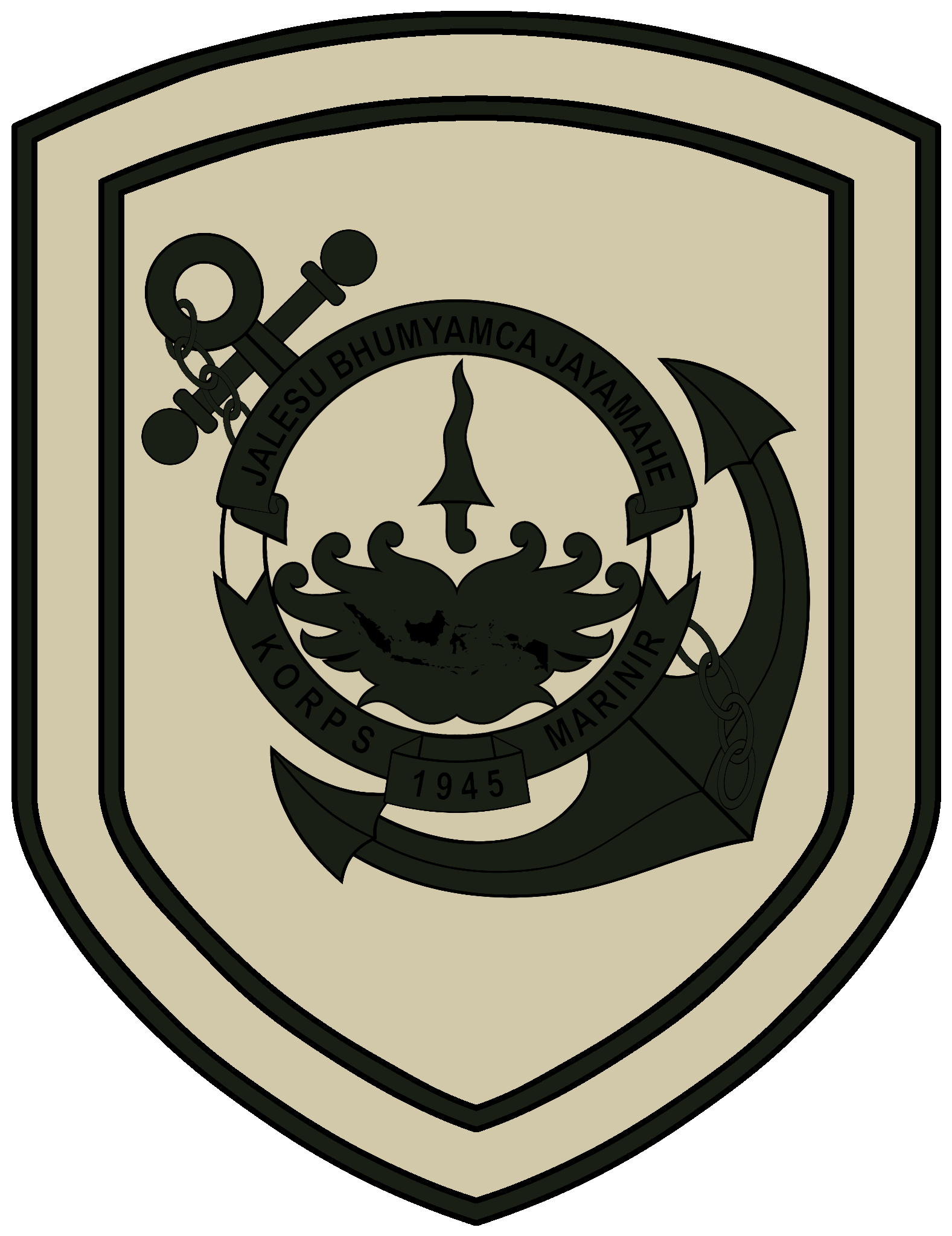
- Headquarters insignia

The Marine Corps of the Republic of Indonesia (Indonesian: Korps Marinir Republik Indonesia, KORMAR RI), previously known as the Commando Corps of the Indonesian Navy (Korps Komando Tentara Nasional Indonesia-Angkatan Laut, KKO), is an integral part of the Indonesian Navy and is sized at the military corps level unit as the naval infantry and main amphibious warfare force of Indonesia. The Marine Corps is commanded by a three-star Marine Lieutenant General.

The Marine Corps was initially formed as a special operations force for the Indonesian Navy (TNI-AL), then named Korps Komando abbreviated "KKO" (lit. 'Commando Corps'). The Marine Corps was actively involved in various confrontations and conflicts in Indonesia.

The Marine Corps also maintains a joint Navy-Marine special operations unit, known as Detasemen Jala Mangkara or DENJAKA (Jala Mangkara Detachment) created on 1 December 1984, and draws operators from the KOPASKA (Navy's Frogman Commando Force) and Taifib (Marine's Amphibious Reconnaissance Battalion).

== History ==
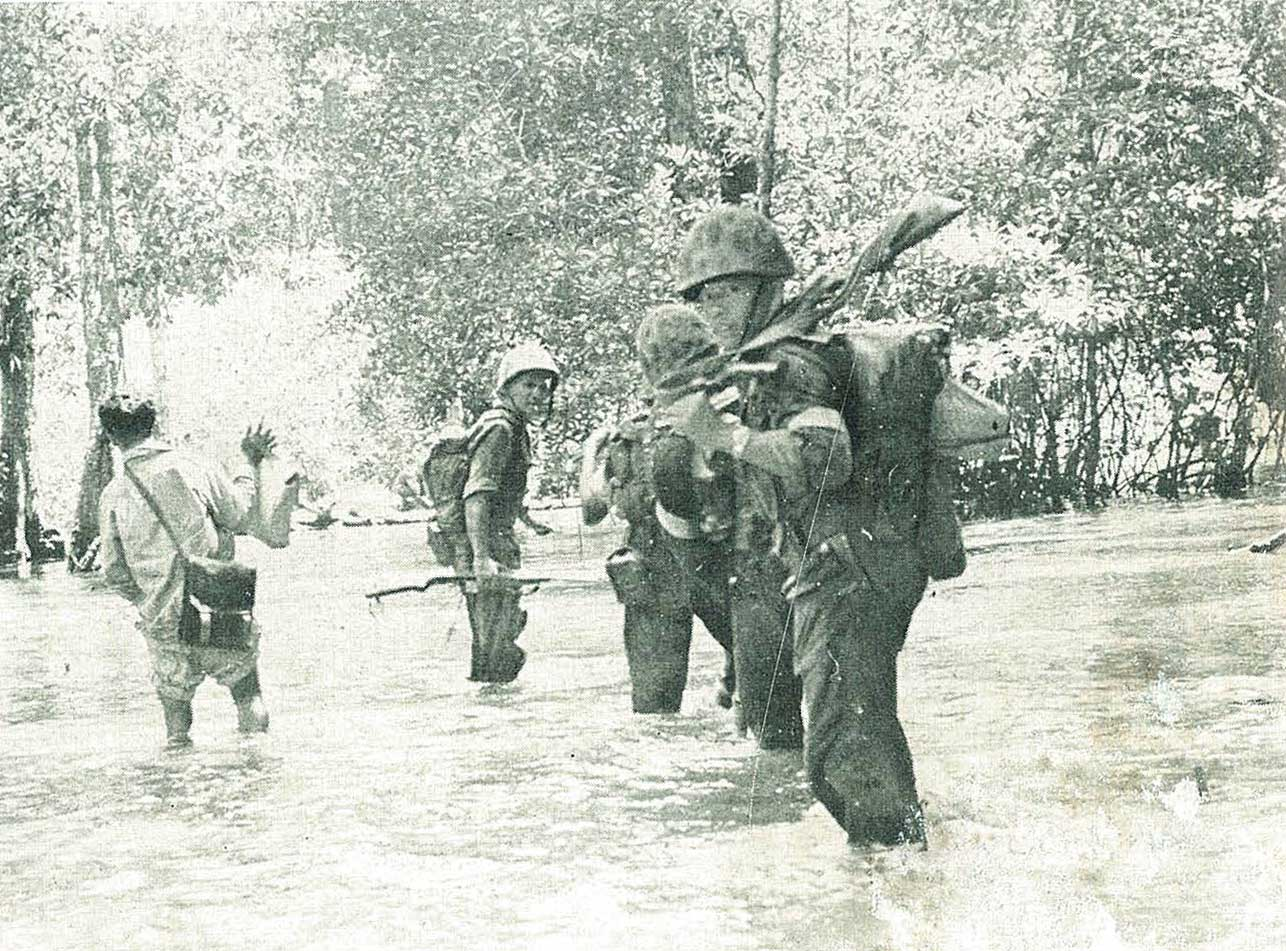
Indonesian marine corps battling Permesta insurgents, 1950–1960s

The forerunner of the Marine Corps was the Corps Mariniers (CM), which was formed on 15 November 1945 at Base IV of ALRI (the previous name of Indonesian Navy) in Tegal. The date was later commemorated as the birthday of the Marine Corps. The CM was originally intended to serve as 'training school' for Navy sailors to be able to fight in ground warfare in case of emergency. Most of its pioneer instructors were graduates of the sailing school. However, at least one of its instructors, Tatang Rusmaja, a former PETA member, actually had experience in ground warfare. Due to a lack of naval equipment or ships, the CM was forced to join guerrilla warfare in the jungles and mountains of Central Java. Marines were deployed several times along with the Army to fight the Royal Netherlands East Indies Army and during this time, the commander of armed forces assigned the CM, which had combat experience as a ground unit, away from the Navy and transformed into a regiment within Diponegoro Division of Indonesian Army on 17 March 1948.

On 9 October 1948, the Ministry of Defense acknowledged the need for an amphibious commando unit and issued Minister Decree No. A/565/1948 regarding the establishment of a naval infantry corps within the Navy named Korps Komando (KKO) or Naval Commando Corps. The first recruitment batch of this new commando unit arrived in 1949 and almost all of the first recruits were veterans of the CM in Tegal. Later on, the huge number of CM veterans in active duty within this formation would later justify the date of the Marine Corps Birthday, being set and held annually every 15 November in memory of its foundation. In 1950 the armored element was raised, the basis of the 1st Marine Cavalry Regiment, armed at first with equipment left behind by the Dutch.

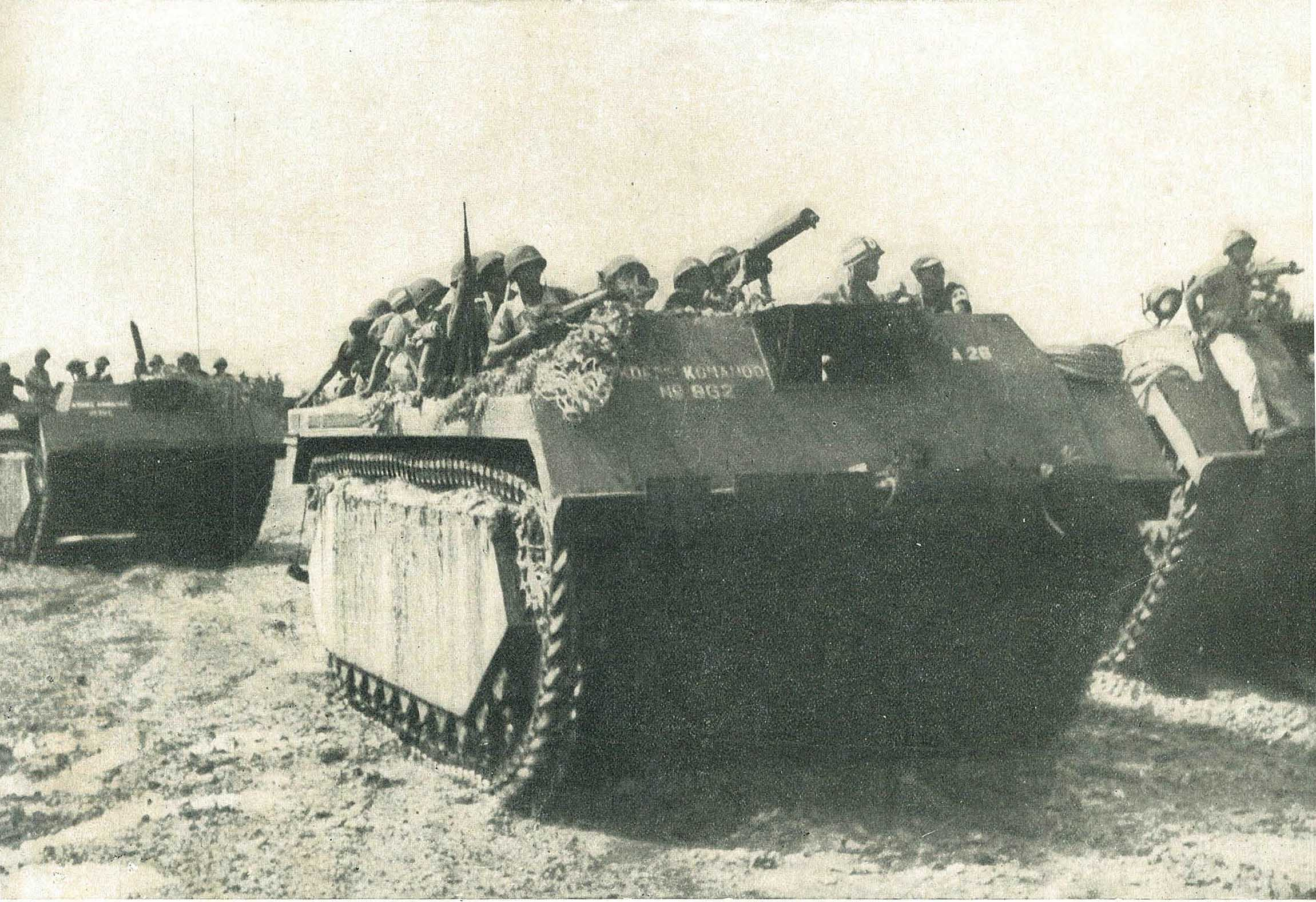
Indonesian Naval Corps Command (KKO) LVTs, circa 1960s. Location unknown

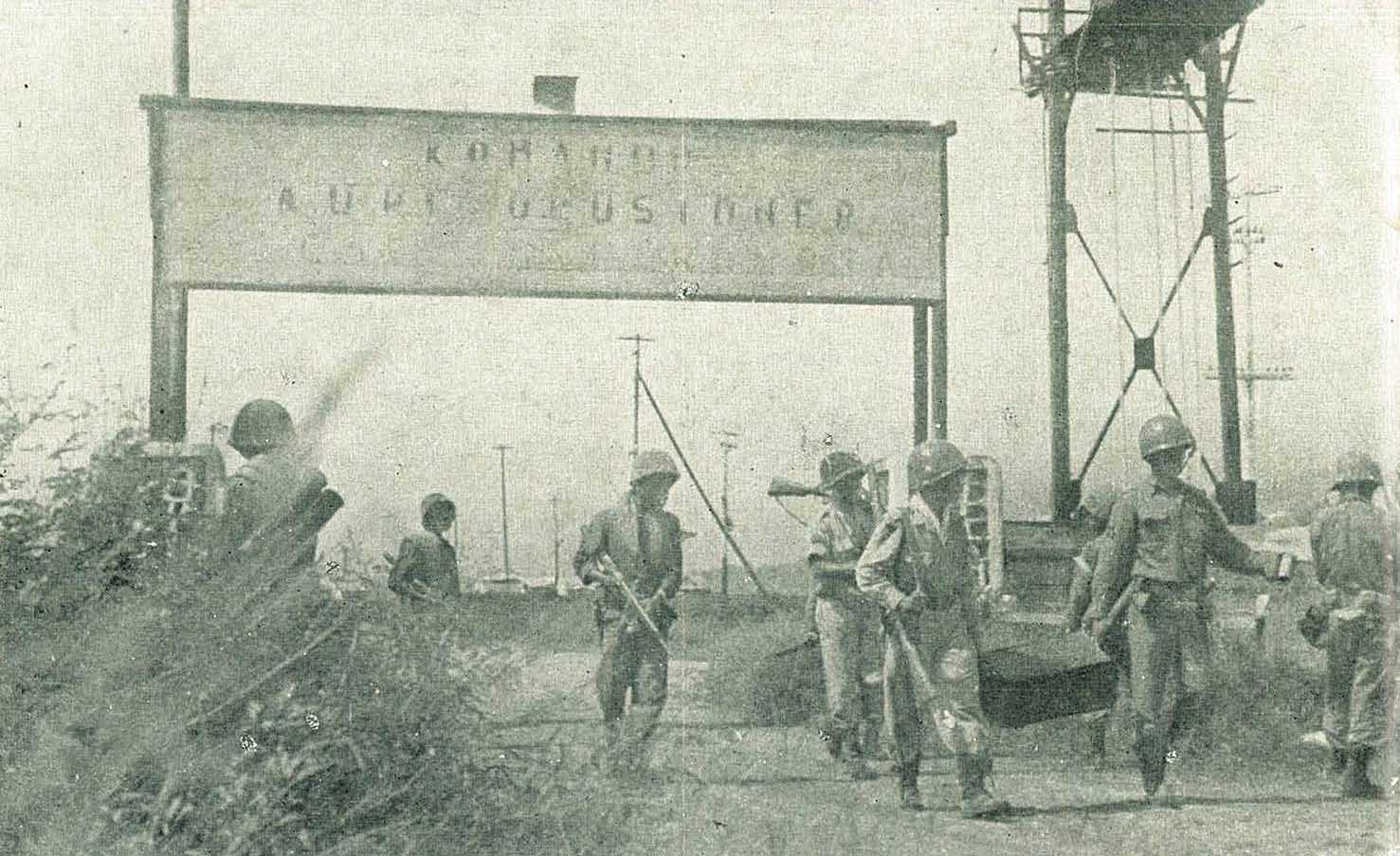
Indonesian Navy Commandos (KKO Marines) occupying Langowan Airfield circa 1960s

The KKO was active in various military operations in Indonesia. One of the largest amphibious military operations would have been Operation Jayawijaya in which thousands of marines were planned to land on Biak in 1963 as a part of the Trikora Campaign to take West Irian from Dutch control. The operation was aborted as a consequence of deals preceding the New York Agreement. That campaign saw massive rearmament of the Corps as per the national policies of guided democracy in the later years of the Sukarno presidency, part of the increasing military ties between Indonesia and the Warsaw Pact, wherein the former US-made equipment would be replaced by Russian-produced APCs and IFVs including the PT-76 Amphibious light tanks, BTR-50 APCs and BM-14/17 MRLs (Southeast Asia's first-ever MRL system in service).

At the height of the Indonesia-Malaysia Confrontation, Harun Hj Mohd Said and Usman Ali (hereinafter known as Usman Harun), two members of the KKO were dispatched to Singapore ( then a part of Malaysia ) using rubber boats. Their main task was to infiltrate and sabotage the interests of Malaysia and Singapore. In reality, this operation was only able to blow up the MacDonald House and cause civilian and non-military casualties. In that incident, 20 fruit shops around the hotel were heavily damaged, 24 sedan vehicles were destroyed, 30 people died, and 35 people suffered mild and serious injuries. This incident is known as the MacDonald House bombing. Usman Harun was unable to escape from Singapore and was eventually arrested and sentenced to death by the Singaporean government.

On 15 November 1975 (the Corps' 30th anniversary), Chief of Staff of the Navy issued a decree Skept/1831/XI/1975, which restored the Corps' name to its former name Korps Marinir. (Corps Mariniers/ CM is the same word but using old spelling system in Indonesian.) Following this, a massive reorganization plan was implemented, followed up with another in 1984.

There was a plan in 1999 to expand the Marine Corps from its strength of 13,000 troops. Based on this plan, every Marine Base would have three combat brigades: the Infantry, Cavalry, and Artillery and would be supported by one Combat Support Regiment and one Administration Support Regiment. The expansion would create three Kormar bases: Surabaya for Eastern area command, Jakarta for Central area command, and Rate Island in Lampung for Western area command.

The 1st Marine Brigade and all combat support and service support elements were consolidated in 2001 to form the 1st Marine Forces East (Pasmar 1). In 2004, the 2nd Marine Forces West (Pasmar 2) was established on the basis of the Marine Independent Brigade, now including the 2nd and 3rd Marine Brigades plus additional combat support and service support units. All these were a result of a massive modernization and expansion program that still continues today. A 3rd division-sized unit would be raised in 2018 as part of the expansion.

Following a reorganisation introduced in March 2001, the corps consisted of the 1st Marine Corps Group (1,3,5 Battalions, 1st combat support regiment, and 1st administrative support regiment) at Surabaya and the Independent Marine Corps Brigade (2,4,6, battalions) at Jakarta (JDW 11 April 2001). The 8th Battalion was formed in January 2004 and the 9th Battalion was due to be formed in April 2004. They were planned to be part of a new group that would include the 7th Battalion and support elements. (JDW 18 February 2004, p. 18) The same Jane's Defence Weekly story (Robert Karniol, 'Indonesia Reinforces Marines') said the Marine Corps leadership is reported to have ambitions for the service to expand to at least two full divisions. However, it was reported that the army was opposed, 'perhaps reflecting its leadership's concern over influence.'

=== History of the beret color and Corps emblem (Gold Anchor and Black Kris) ===
In 1958, the color purple was used by the Marine Corps (when it was still called KKO-AL) in the form of a ribbon as security code to hold landing operations in Padang, West Sumatera during Operation 17 August (as a response to the PPRI/Permesta revolt by several Indonesian Army officers). The purple beret was the first time used by the 1st Battalion KKO AL (1st Marine Battalion) in Operation Alugoro in Aceh in August 1961. Furthermore, the beret was to be later equipped with an official badge representing the Corps. Initially, the Marine Corps emblem was a red pentagon with the symbol of a golden tricorn hat and two crossed swords in the middle, the beret was pushed to the left where the emblem was located. In 1962, coinciding with the 17th anniversary of KKO-AL (old name of Indonesian Marines), there was a change in the emblem with the introduction of the Keris Samudera sword emblem surrounded by a ribbon with the words "Jalesu Bhumyamca Jayamahe" and there is a writing bearing "Commando Corps" underneath. In between the Corps and Commando writings, there was a printed 1945 number indicating the Marine Corps year of foundation and below the traditional sword, blue wavy lines reflecting the wide Indonesian seas. The emblem was rectangular. In 1968, another change was made to print "Yellow" strips on the outer rings of the rectangular emblem. In 1975, with the issuance of Naval chief of staff order No. / 1831 / XI / 1975 dated 14 November 1975, the name of the Naval Operations Commando Corps (KKO-AL) changed its name to the Marine Corps in accordance with the name of the Corps Mariniers since 1945, and the waves were thus replaced by a blue lotus, its petals symbolizing amphibious operations and with a silhouette map of Indonesia in black at the center, the emblem now being circular and the gold "Commando Corps" ribbon with the lettering in black changed to that of "Marine Corps". In 1976, the Chief of Staff of the Navy issued Decree No. Skep / 2084 / X / 1976 dated 20 October 1976, on the Change of the Marine Corps Emblem to comply with the earlier decree on the return to the former name of the corps. The change was to add the Anchor with golden chain as the background of the emblem (to signify the Corps as a constituent service of the Indonesian Navy), the "Marine Corps" ribbon was partially modified and the number "1945" remained at the center as before. The emblem is mounted on a beret provided that the center of the emblem base is located just above the outer end of the left eye's forehead, and thus is pushed to the right. So the official Corps emblem officially began to be used exactly on the 31st Marine Corps Birthday Parade in Jakarta on 15 November 1976 when new colours were awarded to the Corps.

- The Naval Commando Corps (KKO-AL) Emblem was used in 1960–1962, Based on the KKO-AL Commandant's order dated 4 January 1961 Skept Number: 02/KP/KKO/1961.
- The Naval Commando Corps (KKO-AL) Emblem was used in 1962–1976, Based on the Commander-in-Chief's command dated 10 September 1962 Skept Number: 5030.6.
- The Marine Corps Emblem was Used in 1976–Present, Based on Chief of Staff of the Navy order dated 20 October 1976 Skept Number: Skep/2084/X/ 1976

=== Symbolism of the Gold Anchor and Black Kris ===
- Black Saber Kris Samudera (Saber of the Ocean) - honors the naval heritage of the early Hindu and Buddhist kingdoms, the Christian Kingdom of Larantuka and later Islamic sultanates that form part of modern-day Indonesia
- Relief map on the blue Lotus - The relief map of Indonesia on the blue lotus flower symbolizes the national responsibility of the Corps in the defense of Indonesia through amphibious sea and ground combat operations
- Gold Anchor with Black Chain - acknowledges the naval tradition of the Marines and their continual service as a specialty branch and service within the Indonesian Navy
- Marine Corps Motto "Jalesu Bhumyamca Jayamahe" (Glorious On The Land And Sea) - The Sanskrit motto of the Corps reflects its duty to help the nation win victories in amphibious and conventional ground, air and sea operations, the gold scrolls which hold the motto also remember the cultural heritage of the country it defends

== Organization ==
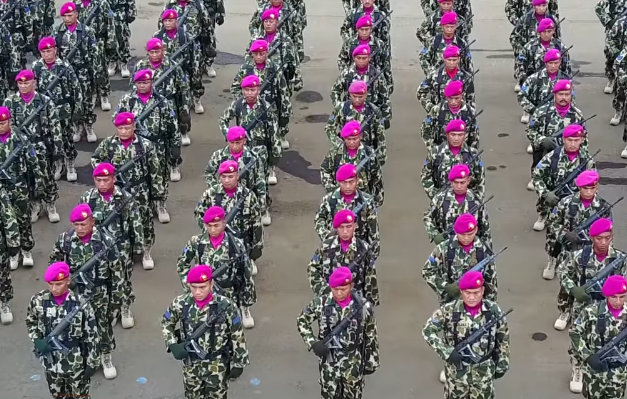
Indonesian Marines in parade formation

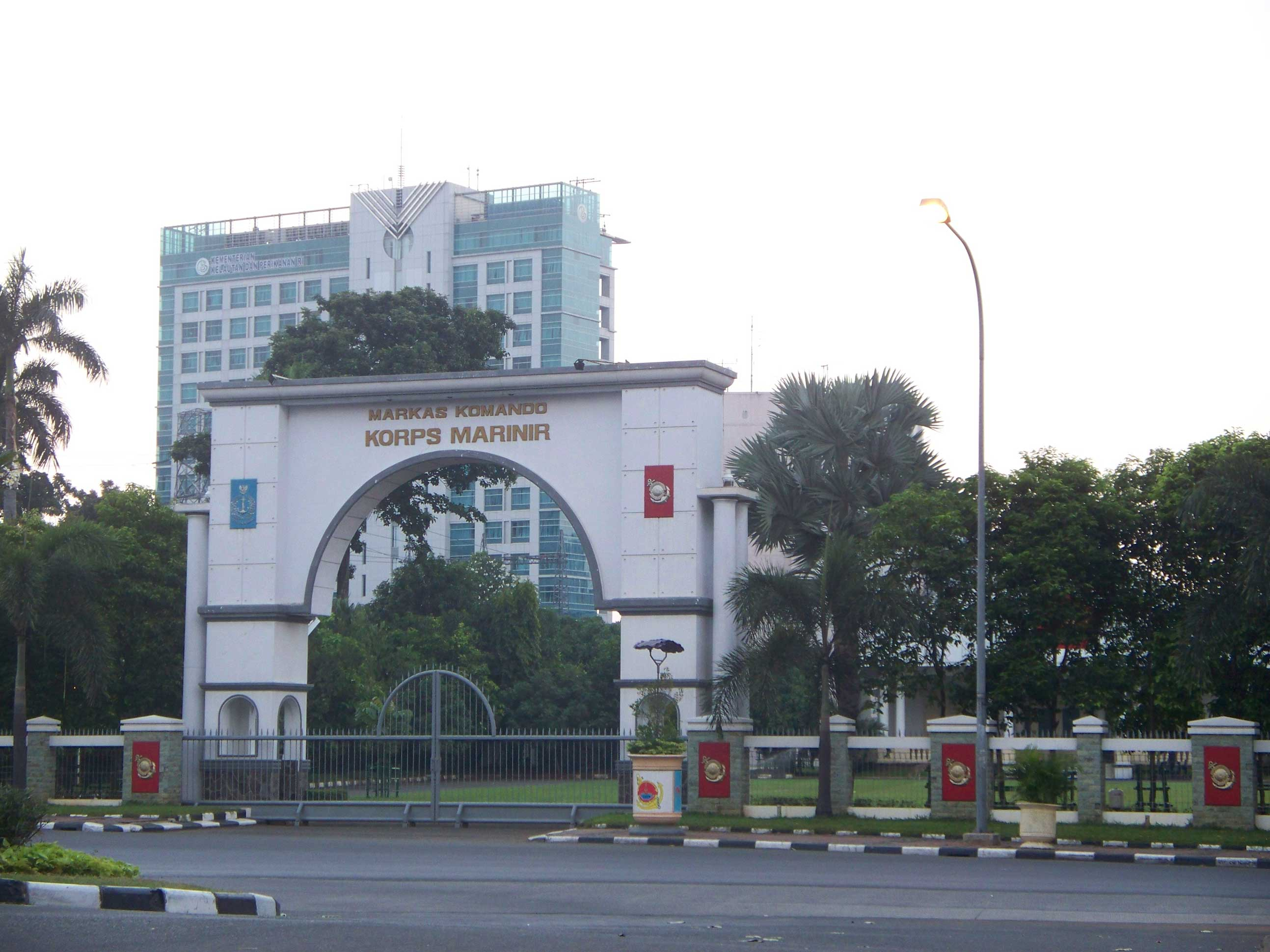
Marine Corps Headquarters in Central Jakarta

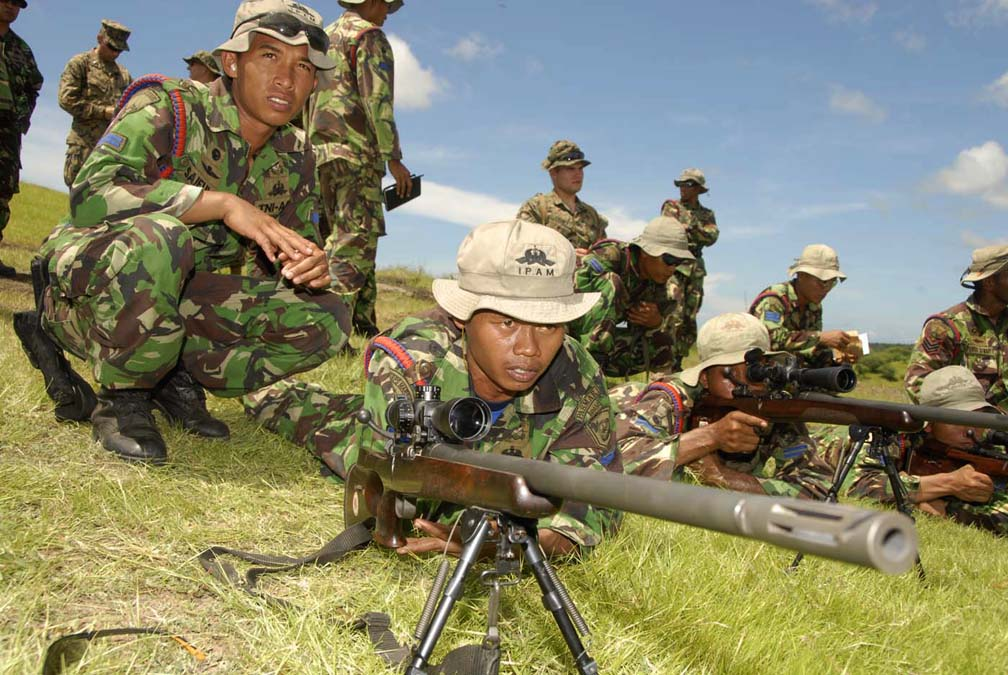
Indonesian Marines Taifib snipers

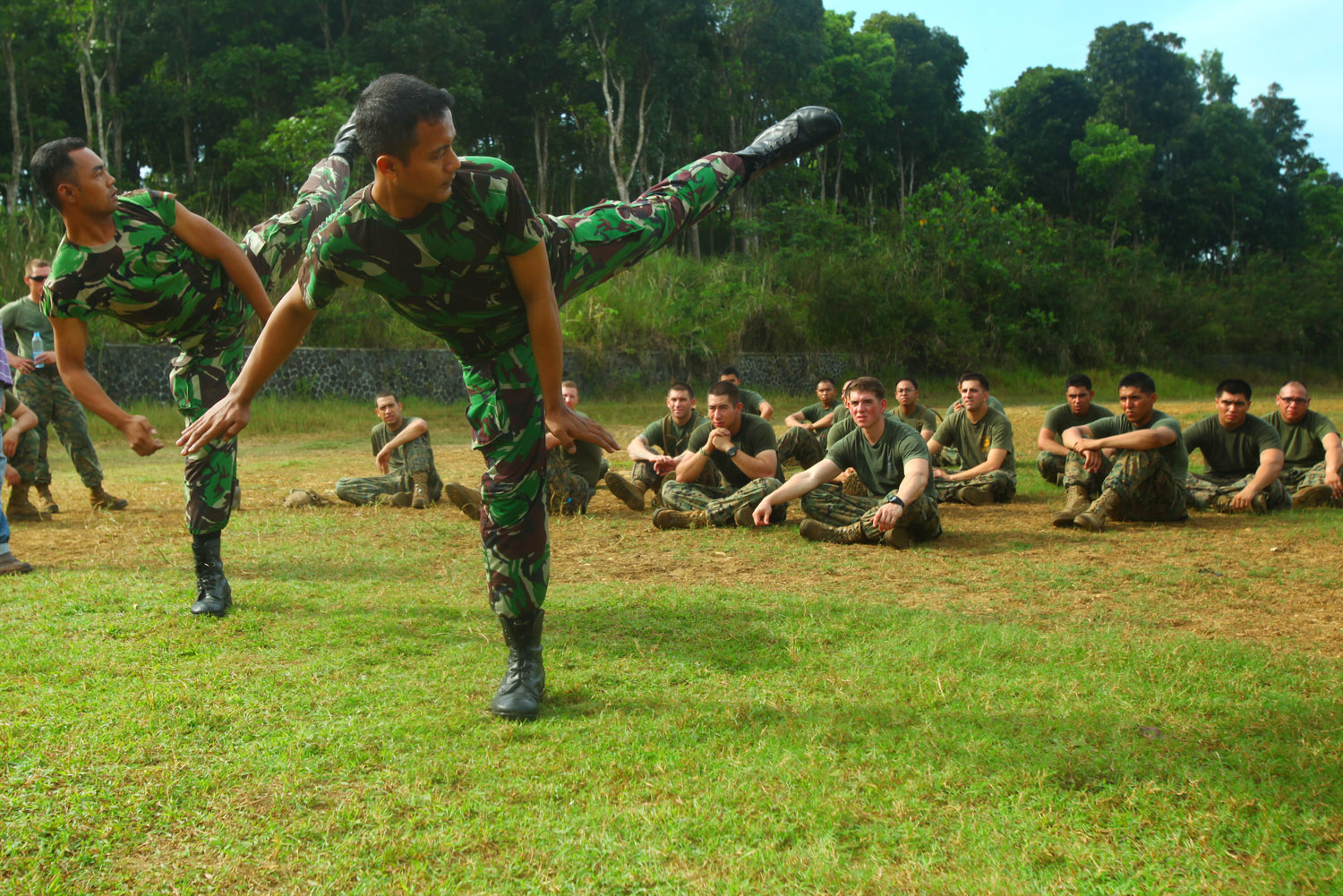
Indonesian Marines demonstrating to USMC Marines

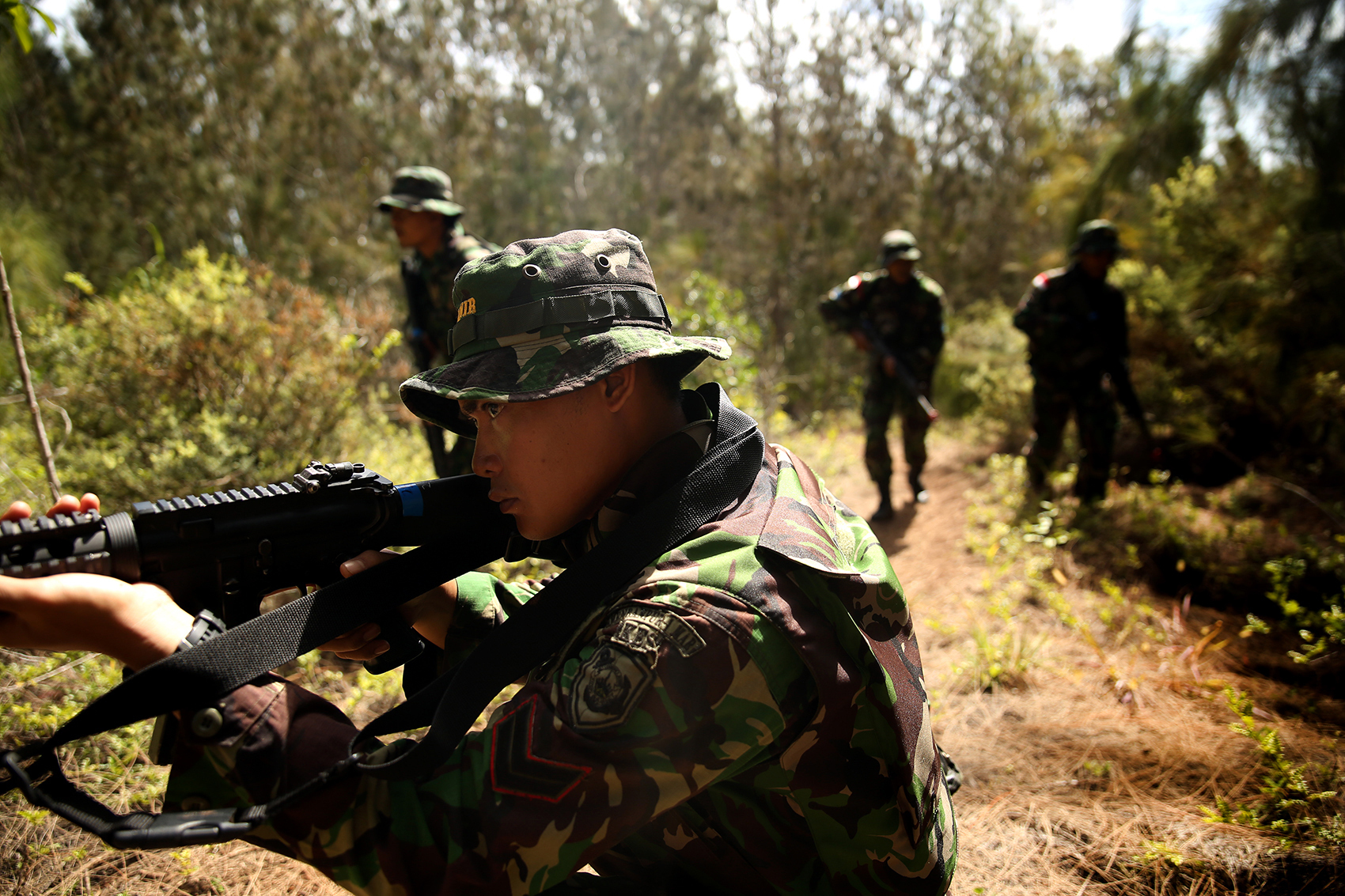
US, Indonesia Marines train together during RIMPAC Exercise 2014

The order of battle of the Indonesian Marine Corps consists of three divisions, one independent brigade, and a special ops unit (Taifib). Each Marine division oversees a Marine Infantry Brigade, a Marine Combat Support Regiment, a Marine Artillery Regiment and a Marine Cavalry Regiment. The 4th Marine Infantry Brigade covers 4 Marine Infantry Battalions plus other support units. The Marine Corps also maintain a special operations unit which are the Marine's Amphibious Reconnaissance Battalion (Taifib) and also the joint Navy-Marine's counter-terrorism Denjaka.

As a component Principal Command of the Indonesian Navy, the Marine Corps is structured into the following in accordance with the provisions of Presidential Regulation No. 84/2025 on the Organization of the Indonesian National Armed Forces:

=== Leadership elements ===
1. Commander of the Marine Corps (Panglima Korps Marinir), position held by a 3-star Marine Lieutenant General and
2. Chief of Staff of the Marine Corps (Kepala Staf Korps Marinir), position held by a 2-star Marine Major General.

=== Leadership support elements ===
1. Inspectorate of the Marine Corps (Inspektorat Korps Marinir), headed by the Marine Corps Inspector General which holds the rank of 1-star Marine Brigadier General and oversees three subdivisions:
  - Marine Corps General Inspectorate (Inspektorat Umum Korps Marinir);
  - Marine Corps Operations and Training Inspectorate (Inspektorat Operasi dan Latihan Korps Marinir); and
  - Marine Corps Treasury Inspectorate (Inspektorat Perbendaharaan Korps Marinir).
2. Advisory Staffs to the Marine Corps Commander (Staf Ahli):
3. Marine Corps Planning and Budgeting Staff (Staf Perencanaan dan Anggaran);
4. Marine Corps Intelligence Staff (Staf Intelijen);
5. Marine Corps Operations Staff (Staf Operasi);
6. Marine Corps Personnel Staff (Staf Personalia);
7. Marine Corps Logistics Staff (Staf Logistik);
8. Marine Corps Maritime Potential Staff (Staf Potensi Maritim); and
9. Marine Corps Communications and Electronics Staff (Staf Komunikasi dan Elektronika).

=== Service elements ===
- Marine Corps Headquarters Detachment (Detasemen Markas Komando Korps Marinir), which oversee the following units:
  1. Marine Corps Administration Coordinator (Koordinator Administrasi);
  2. Marine Corps Secretariat General (Sekretariat Umum);
  3. Marine Corps Center for Command and Control (Pusat Komando dan Pengendalian); and
  4. Marine Corps HQ Accounting Office (Akuntansi).

=== Central Executive Agencies under the Marine Corps Headquarters ===
1. Marine Corps Information and Data Processing Service (Dinas Informasi dan Pengolahan Data);
2. Marine Corps Public Relations Service (Dinas Penerangan);
3. Marine Corps Personnel Administration Service (Dinas Administrasi Personel);
4. Marine Corps Justice Service (Dinas Hukum);
5. Marine Corps Medical Service (Dinas Kesehatan);
6. Marine Corps Provost Service (Dinas Provos);
7. Marine Corps Materiel Service (Dinas Material);
8. Marine Corps Materiel Maintenance Service (Dinas Pemeliharaan Material);
9. Marine Corps Base Facilities Service (Dinas Fasilitas Pangkalan);
10. Marine Corps Territorial Service (Dinas Teritori);
11. Marine Corps Communications and Electronic Warfare Service (Dinas Komunikasi dan Peperangan Elektronika);
12. Marine Corps Weaponry and Electronics Service (Dinas Senjata dan Elektronik); and
13. Marine Corps Regional Finance Office (Keuangan Wilayah).

=== Principal Operational Commands ===
1. 1st Marine Force (Pasukan Marinir 1), based in Cilincing (North Jakarta) and organized into:
  - 1st Marine Infantry Brigade;
  - 1st Marine Artillery Regiment;
  - 1st Marine Cavalry Regiment;
  - 1st Marine Combat Support Regiment;
  - 1st Marine Engineer Regiment;
  - 1st Marine Para-Amphibious Recon Detachment;
  - 1st Marine Force HQ Detachment;
  - 1st Marine Force Provost Detachment; and
  - 1st Marine Force Intelligence Detachment.
2. 2nd Marine Force (Pasukan Marinir 2), based in Gedangan (Sidoarjo) and organized into:
  - 2nd Marine Infantry Brigade;
  - 2nd Marine Artillery Regiment;
  - 2nd Marine Cavalry Regiment;
  - 2nd Marine Combat Support Regiment;
  - 2nd Marine Engineer Regiment;
  - 2nd Marine Para-Amphibious Recon Detachment;
  - 2nd Marine Force HQ Detachment;
  - 2nd Marine Force Provost Detachment; and
  - 2nd Marine Force Intelligence Detachment.
3. 3rd Marine Force (Pasukan Marinir 3), based in Klaurung (Sorong) and organized into:
  - 3rd Marine Infantry Brigade;
  - 3rd Marine Artillery Regiment;
  - 3rd Marine Cavalry Regiment;
  - 3rd Marine Combat Support Regiment;
  - 3rd Marine Engineer Regiment;
  - 3rd Marine Para-Amphibious Recon Detachment;
  - 3rd Marine Force HQ Detachment;
  - 3rd Marine Force Provost Detachment; and
  - 3rd Marine Force Intelligence Detachment.

=== Operational Commands ===
- 4th Marine Infantry Brigade (Brigade Infanteri 4/Marinir), directly overseen by Marine Corps HQ, pending the formation of new Marine Force.
- 5th Marine Infantry Brigade (Brigade Infanteri 5/Marinir), directly overseen by Marine Corps HQ, pending the formation of new Marine Force.
- 6th Marine Infantry Brigade (Brigade Infanteri 6/Marinir), directly overseen by Marine Corps HQ, pending the formation of new Marine Force.
- Marine Corps Training Command (Komando Latih Marinir);
- Marine Corps Base Jakarta (Pangkalan Marinir Jakarta);
- Marine Corps Base Surabaya (Pangkalan Marinir Surabaya);
- Marine Corps Base Sorong (Pangkalan Marinir Sorong);
- Marine Corps Central Hospital Cilandak (Rumah Sakit Marinir Cilandak);
- E.W.A. Pangalila Marine Corps Hospital Surabaya (Rumah Sakit Marinir E.W.A. Pangalila);

==== Planned ====
- 4th Marine Force, to be based in Nusantara. The Commander of the Armed Forces, Adm. Yudo Margono stated that the new marine force will be formed initially from the 4th Marine Infantry Brigade.

==== Liquidated ====
- In August 2025, Navy Chief of Staff Adm. Muhammad Ali ordered the gradual dissolution of Marine Base Defense Battalions (Batalyon Pertahanan Pangkalan Marinir / Yonhanlanmar), as part of organizational reform. The role of these battalions will be replaced by the Marine Coast Defense Units. Later on 12 February 2026, Marine Lt. Gen. Endi Supardi, Commander of the Marine Corps, officially disbanded all 14 battalions in a ceremony. The Marine Base Defense Battalions are spread across 1st Marine Force (1st, 2nd, 3rd, 4th, and 12th Marine Base Defense Battalion), 2nd Marine Force (5th, 6th, 7th, 8th, and 13th Marine Base Defense Battalion), and 3rd Marine Force (9th, 10th, 11th, and 14th Marine Base Defense Battalion).

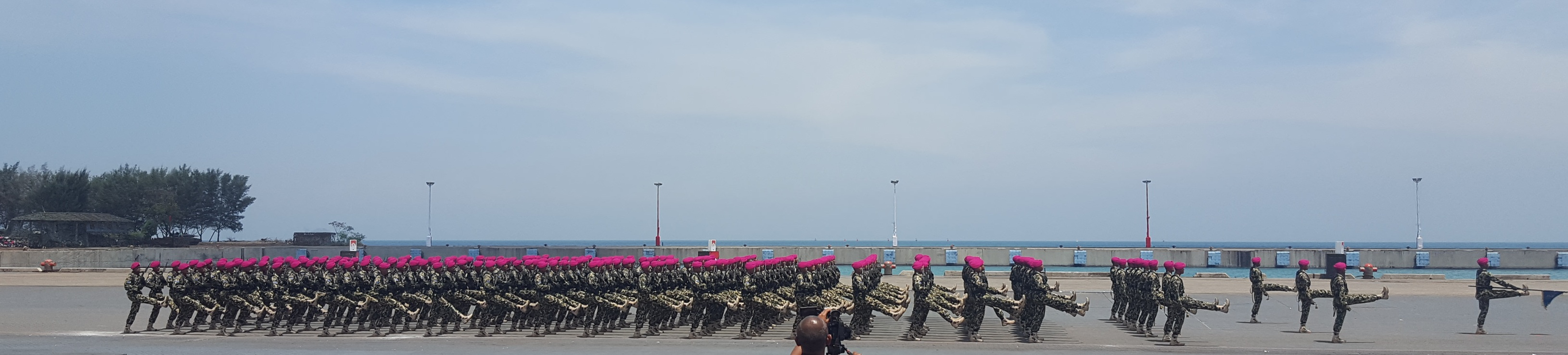
Indonesian Marine Corps marching during a parade in 2017

== Operational commands ==
=== Marine Forces ===
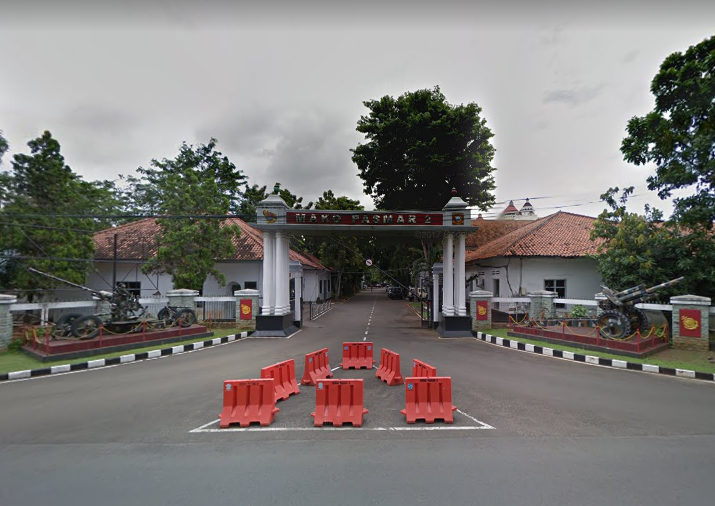
Entrance to the Marine Force I (PASMAR 1) base in Jakarta

The Marine Forces (Pasukan Marinir, abbreviated as Pasmar) is the Marine Corps' main operational command. Pasmar's main operational missions are to foster the strength and capability of operational readiness as the Navy's amphibious force in the framework of power projection to the land by sea, coastal defense operations on strategic islands, and other combat operations in accordance with the policy of the Navy Chief of Staff, Marine Corps Commander, and Commander of the Indonesian National Armed Forces.

The 4th, 5th and 6th Brigades report directly to the commander of the Marine Corps. In addition the Fleet Marine Force (Satmar Koarmada RI), while under the Indonesian Fleet Command, is operationally responsible to the commanders of the Marine Forces.

Each of the 3 Marine Corps Bases (Jakarta, Surabaya and Sorong) are part of the Marine Force ORBAT.

=== Taifib ===
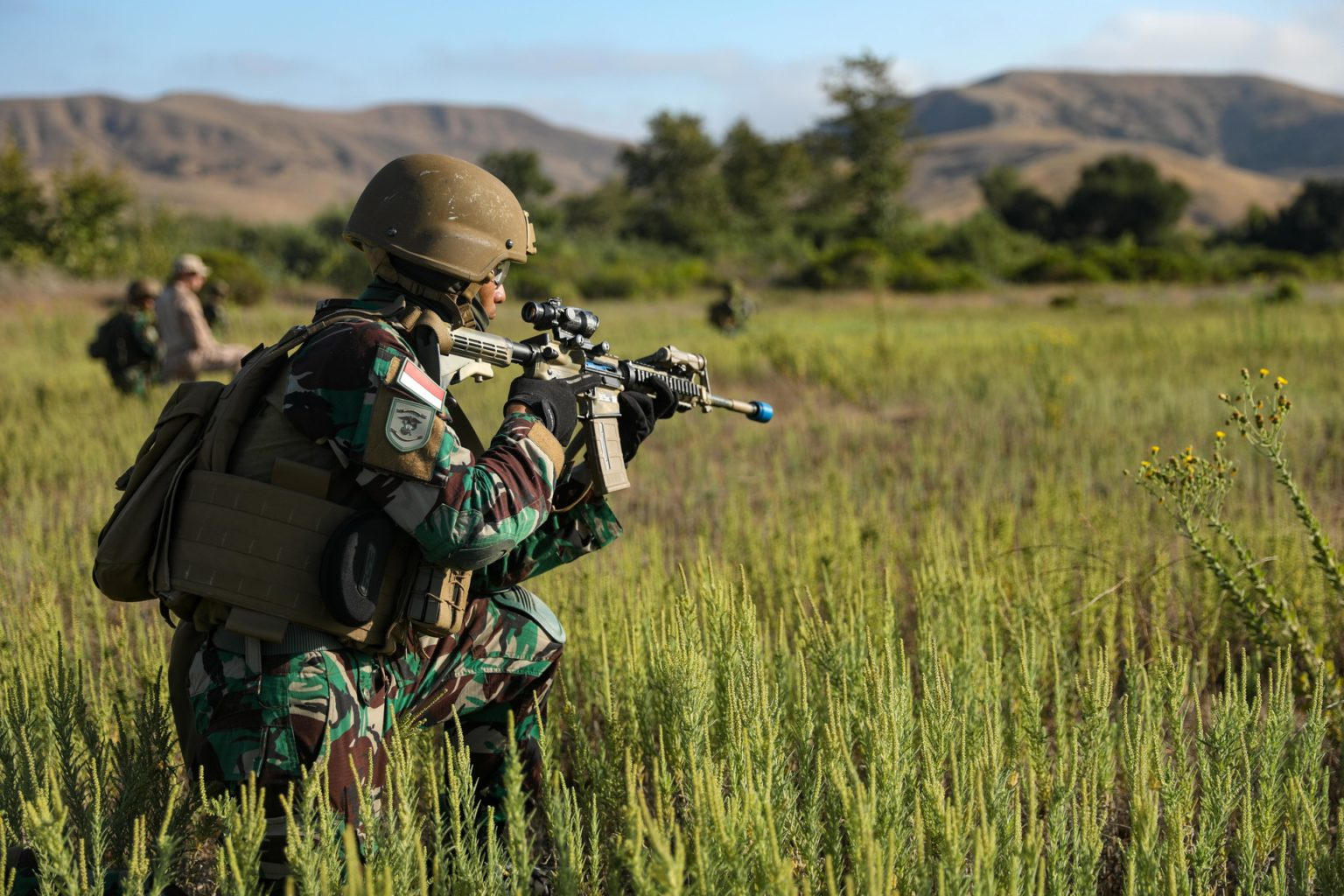
Taifib Marines during RECONEX 21 at Marine Corps Base Camp Pendleton, California, Sept. 6, 2021

The Batalion Intai Amfibi or Taifib in short is the Marine Corps' amphibious reconnaissance special forces, as it is also capable in special reconnaissance and also in airborne (Para-Commando) missions. They were officially formed on 18 March 1961 as marine commandos and was first deployed in Irian Jaya (Papua) during Operation Trikora in April 1962. Starting from November 1971 it was called as Batalyon Intai Amphibi/Yon Taifib or Amphibious Recon Battalion. In order for a regular marine personnel to become a Taifib personnel, a candidate is selected from the Marine Corps who has already fulfilled the thorough mental and physical requirements, and at least has served in the Marine Corps for two years. The certification of amphibious reconnaissance is notoriously difficult that the passing rate of these candidates in each class is only ten percent. The Taifib today is organized into an administrative brigade of three regiment-sized detachments, each of these units assigned to each Marine Force of the Corps.

=== Denjaka ===
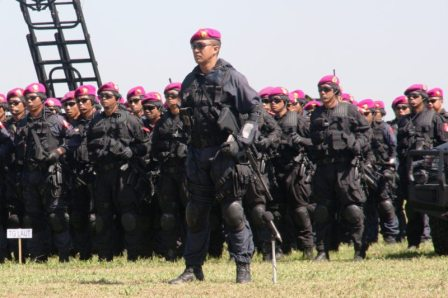
Jala Mangkara Detachment personnel

The Detasemen Jala Mangkara (Detasemen Jala Mangkara) or Denjaka in short is the special operations and counter-terrorism forces of the Indonesian Navy. This is a combined detachment formed from selected personnel of the Navy's Frogmen unit (Kopaska) and the Marine Corps' Taifib. According to the directory of the Navy Chief of Staff, Denjaka is a Marine Corps task force under the Indonesian Navy, with the Commander of the Marine Corps holding responsibilities for general training, while specific training falls under the responsibilities of the Armed Forces' Strategic Intelligence Agency. Meanwhile, operational command of the Denjaka falls directly under the Commander of the National Armed Forces.

=== Marine Corps Training Command ===
The Marine Corps Training Command (Komando Latih Marinir) oversees the following training centers:

1. Marine Special Forces Training Center (Pusat Latihan Khusus) based in Grati, Pasuruan Regency;
2. Marine Amphibious Forces Training Center (Pusat Latihan Pasukan Pendarat) trains Marine personnel in amphibious operations, shooting coordination exercises, personnel embarkation and de-embarkation exercises, and other miscellaneous courses. The center is located in Gunung Sari, Surabaya;
3. Marine Combat Training Centers (Pusat Latihan Tempur Marinir) which consists of following training centers:
  - 3rd Marine Combat Training Center Grati (Pasuruan Regency);
  - 4th Marine Combat Training Center Purboyo (Malang Regency);
  - 5th Marine Combat Training Center Baluran (Situbondo Regency);
  - 6th Marine Combat Training Center Antralina (Sukabumi Regency);
  - 7th Marine Combat Training Center Lampon (Banyuwangi Regency);
  - 8th Marine Combat Training Center Teluk Ratai (Pesawaran Regency);
  - 9th Marine Combat Training Center Dabo Singkep (Lingga Regency);
  - Animha Marine Combat Training Center Tuban (Tuban Regency)
  - Damar Island Marine Combat Training Center (Thousand Islands Regency)
4. Marine Amphibious Landing and Combat Readiness Training Center (Pusat Latihan Pendarat Amfibi dan Kesiapan Tempur); and
5. Marine Specialized Office Training Center (Pusat Latihan Jabatan Khusus), in charge of preparing specialized qualification courses for Marine personnel.

== Insignias and badges ==
Note: Indonesia is not a member of NATO, so there is not an official equivalence between the Indonesian military ranks and those defined by NATO. The displayed parallel is approximate and for illustration purposes only.

In the Marine Corps, as part of the Indonesian Navy, the rank structure consists of officers known as in Indonesian as "Perwira", NCOs ("Bintara") and enlisted personnel ("Tamtama".) While the Marine Corps wears the blue shoulder boards (for officers and WOs) and blue stripes (for enlisted personnel) or blue/gold chevrons (for NCOs) as a component service of the Navy its ranks follow those of the Indonesian Army, with the exception of a five-star rank.

The highest rank obtainable in the Marine Corps is Lieutenant General, which is held by the Commander of the Marine Corps. However, it is possible to be promoted to a higher rank if appointed to a position that requires a four-star rank. Before August 2025, only a few individuals had attained the rank of Lieutenant General, as the Commandant of the Marine Corps previously held the rank of Major General. One of the most notable figures is Lt. Gen. R. Hartono, who notably served as Vice Chief of Staff of the Navy. As of August 2025, the only Marine Corps officer to have ever been promoted to the rank of General is Gen (Hon.) Ali Sadikin. The rank of Marine General is notable as the 4-star rank in the Navy is usually only held by Chief of Staff of the Navy.

=== Officers rank insignia ===
Rank group	General/flag officers				Senior officers			Junior officers
Indonesian Marine Corps
Indonesian Marine Corps	Jenderal	Letnan jenderal	Mayor jenderal	Brigadir jenderal	Kolonel	Letnan kolonel	Mayor	Kapten	Letnan satu	Letnan dua
Rank group	General/flag officers				Senior officers			Junior officers

=== NCOs and enlisted ===
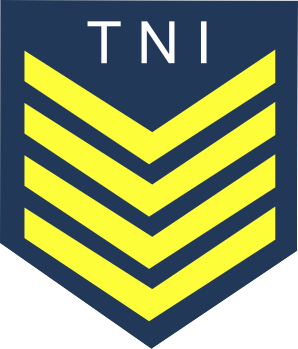
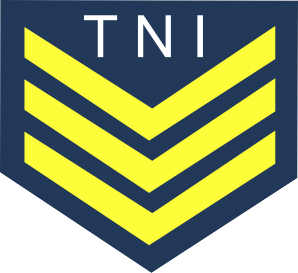
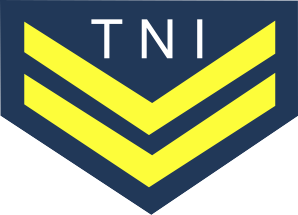
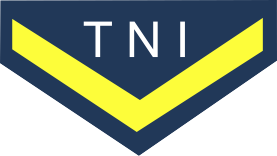
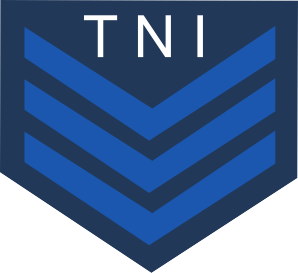
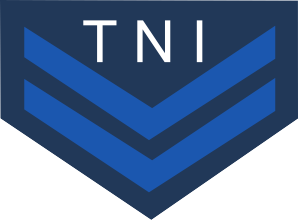
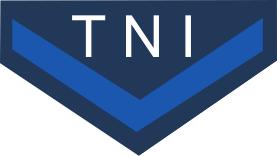
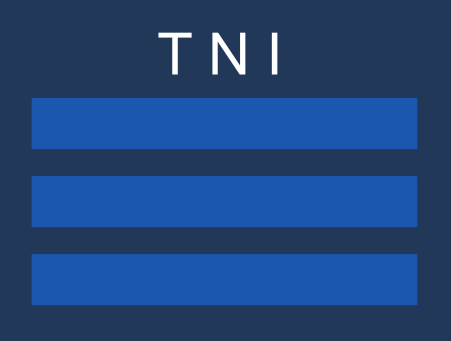
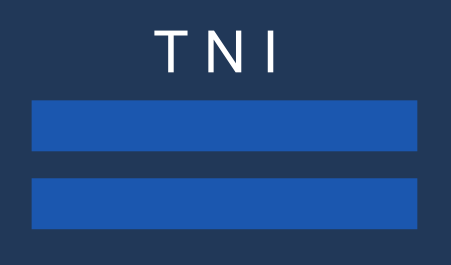
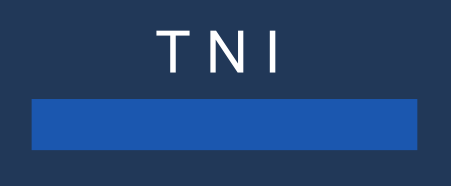
Rank group	Senior NCOs						Junior NCOs			Enlisted
Indonesian Marine Corps
Indonesian Marine Corps	Pembantu letnan satu	Pembantu letnan dua	Sersan mayor	Sersan kepala	Sersan satu	Sersan dua	Kopral kepala	Kopral satu	Kopral dua	Prajurit kepala	Prajurit satu	Prajurit dua
Rank group	Senior NCOs						Junior NCOs			Enlisted

=== Other patches ===
General Patches

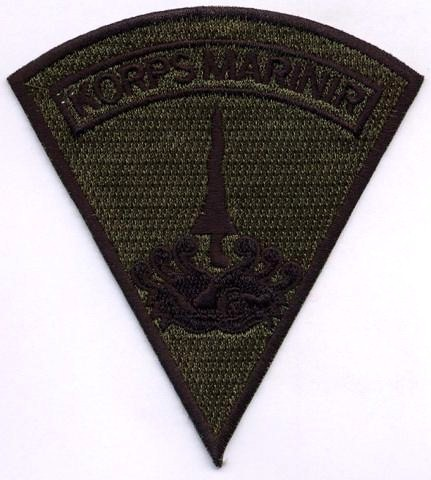
Patch worn on camouflage uniform

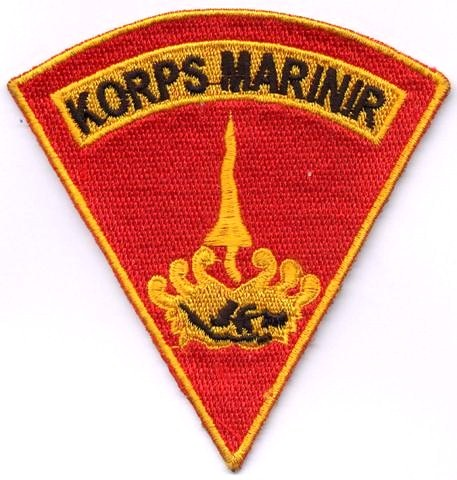
Patch worn on service uniform

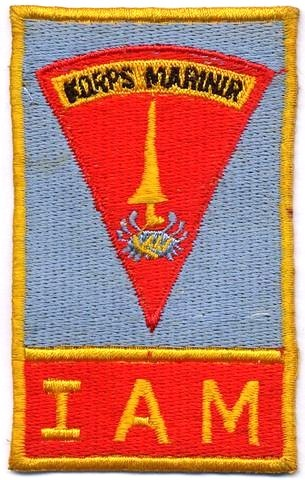
Patch worn by Taifib marines

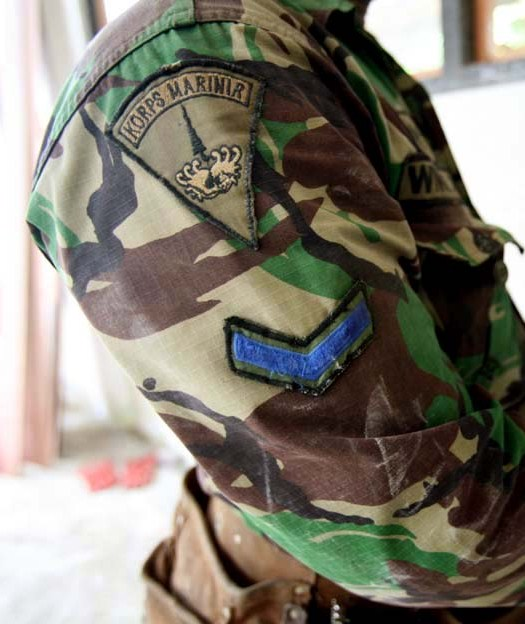
Patch worn by a marine lance corporal rank insignia below
Marine Qualification Badges

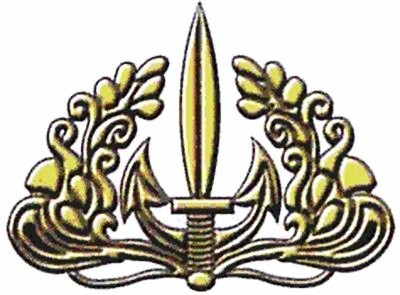
The qualification mark of a Marine reconnaissance commando

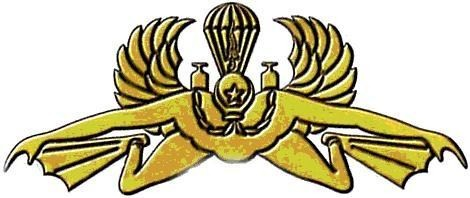
Subversive reconnaissance amphibian parachutist badge of Taifib

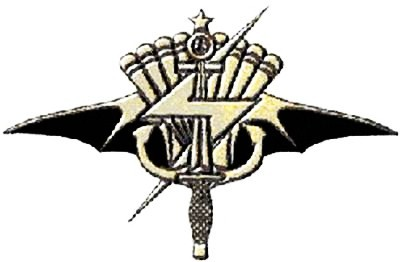
Qualification sign of Denjaka

=== Honorary Wearers of the Magenta Beret ===
As of September 2023, more than 45 individuals have been given the extraordinary privilege by the Commander of Indonesian Marine Corps to become Honorary Marines (Warga Kehormatan Kormar TNI-AL) which include the wearing of the Marine Corps combat dress uniform and the magenta beret with the Corps Emblem.

== List of Commanders ==
The Commander of the Marine Corps is a position that is filled by a three star general officer of the Marine Corps by appointment of the Chief of Staff of the Navy.

== Attire & Light Weaponry ==
TNI PRIMA Camo

Distruptive Pattern Material Camo (Malvinas Camo)

Leopard Camo

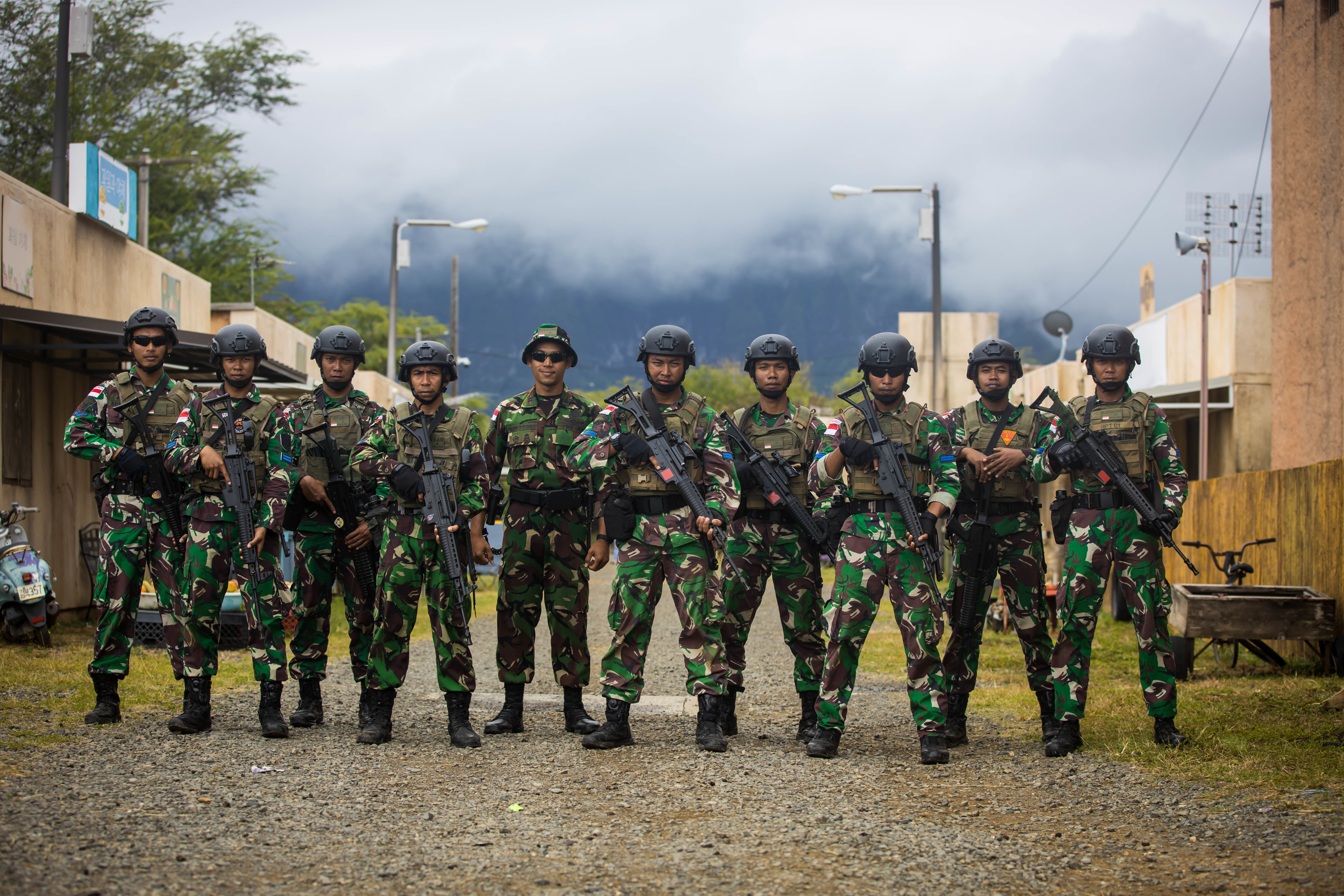
KORMAR soldiers equipped with SS2-V1 and SS2-V4 assault rifles.

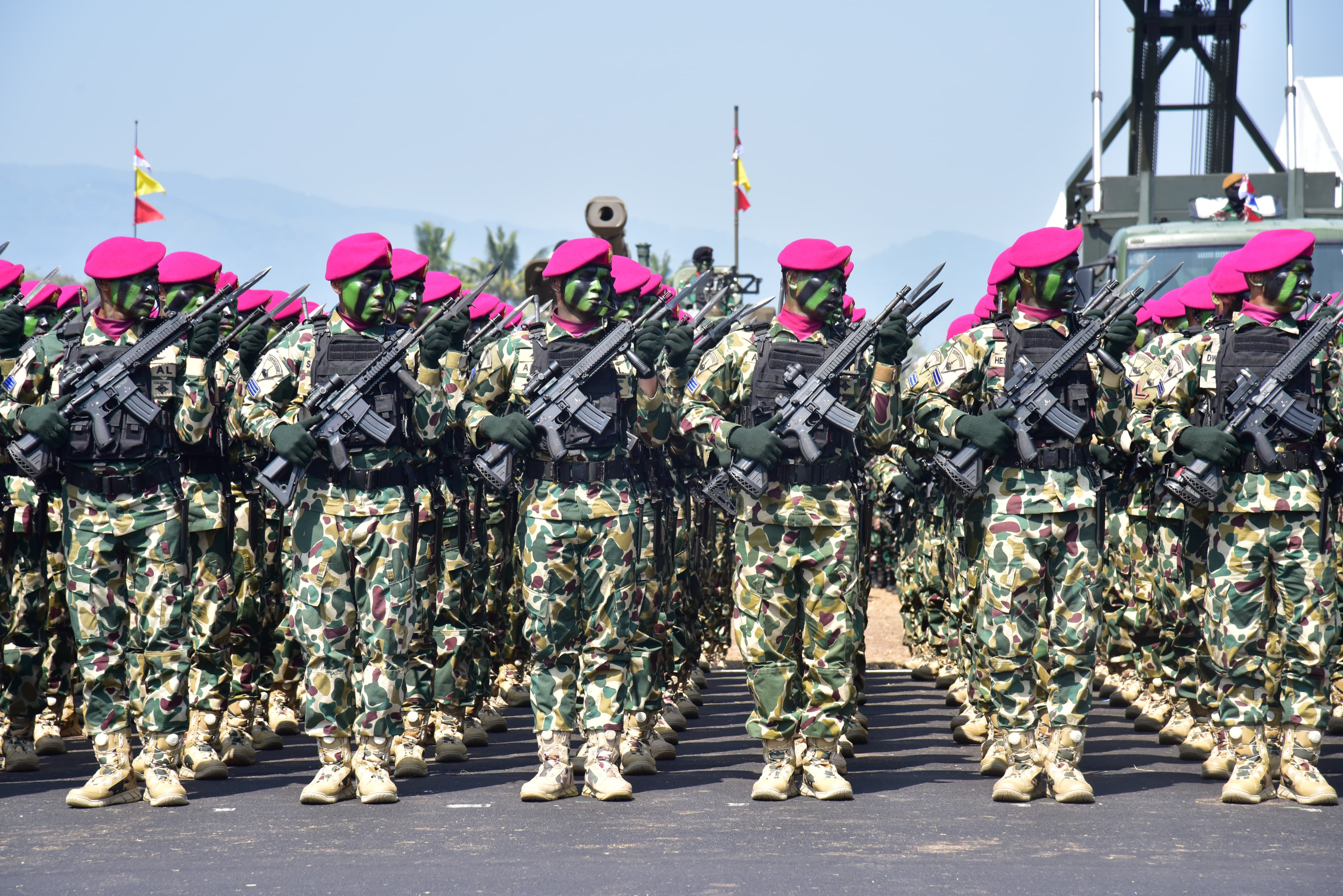
KORMAR soldiers equipped with HK416 and SIG516 assault rifles.

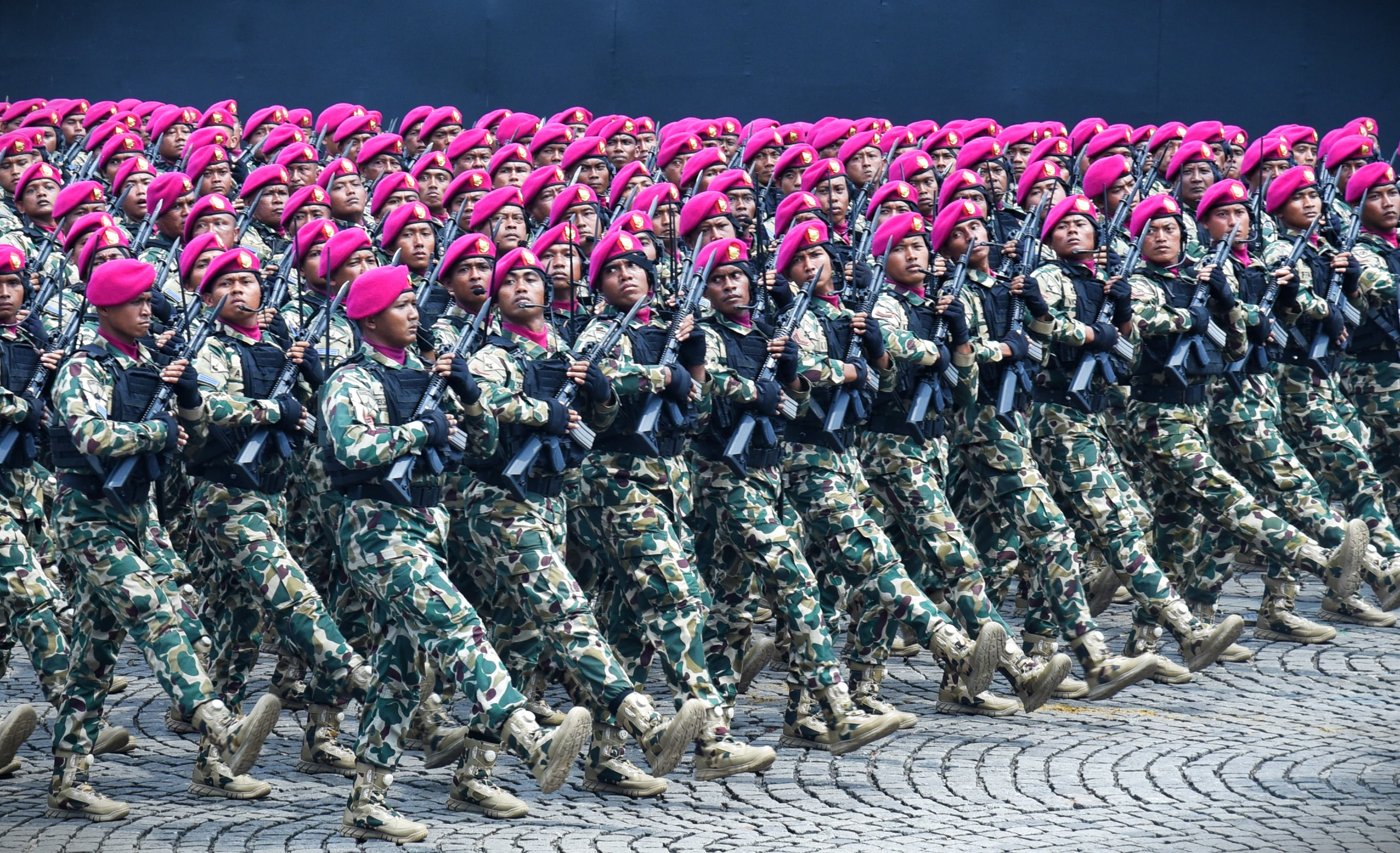
KORMAR soldiers equipped with PC 816 V1 assault rifles.

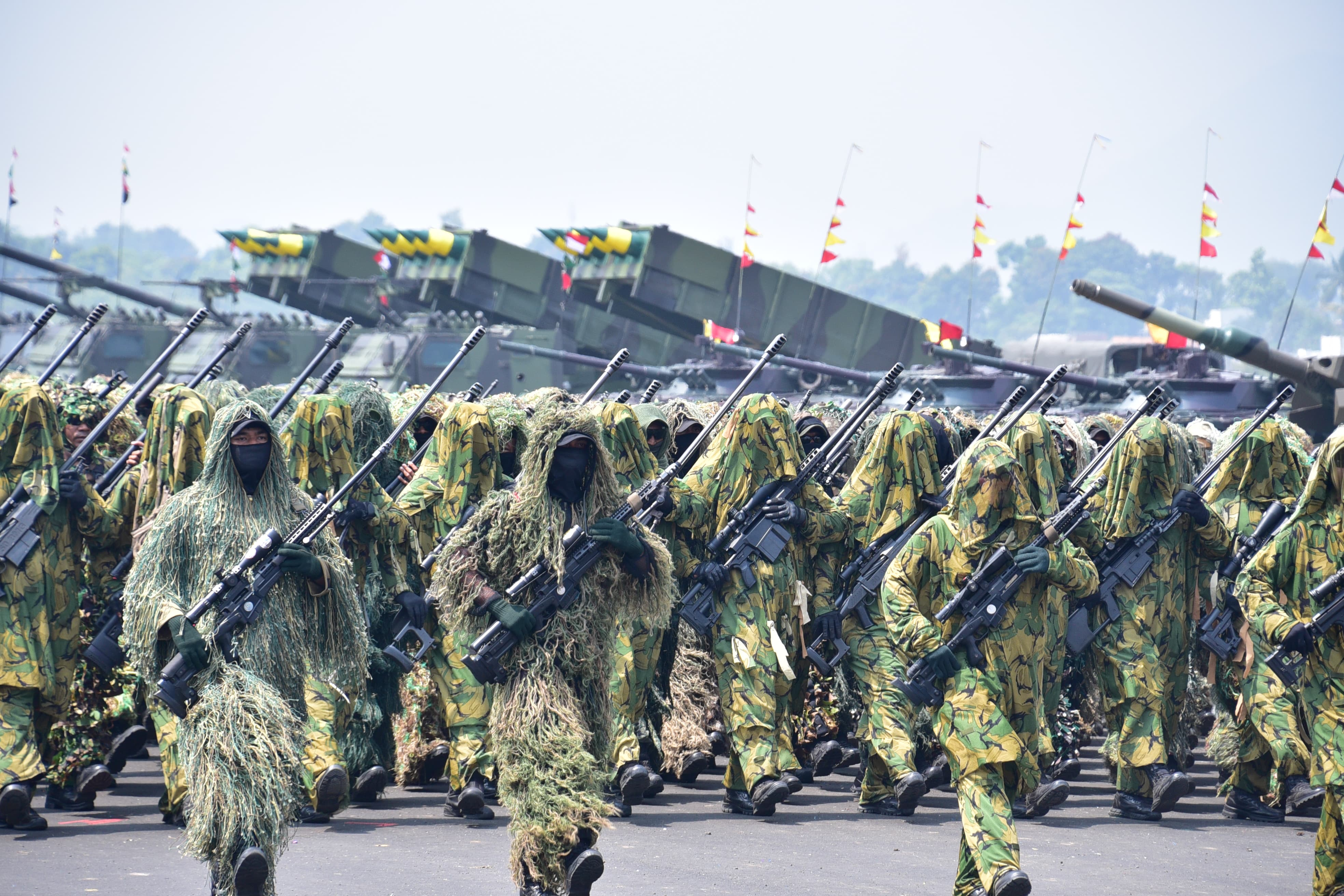
KORMAR soldiers equipped with various sniper and anti-materiel rifles.

- Pistol: Pindad G2, Beretta APX, P226, P7M8.
- Submachine gun: Pindad PM3, MP5, Uzi.
- Assault rifle: Pindad SS1, Pindad SS2, PC 816 V1, HK416, SIG516, M4A1, SOAR IAR, CZ 805 BREN, AKM-103, SIG SG 550.
- Machine-gun: Pindad SM3, K3, Pindad SM2, MG5, M134 Minigun.
- Designated marksman rifle: HK417, SG 550-1.
- Sniper rifle: Pindad SPR-3, SSG 04, RPA, Barrett MRAD, AW, AWM, TRG M10.
- Anti-materiel rifle: Pindad SPR-2, Barrett M82, M93, CMS-12.7, NTW-20.
- Anti-tank: RPG-7, 9K115-2 Metis-M, MILAN.

== See also ==
- Marines
- Amphibious warfare

=== Indonesian Naval Special Forces ===
- Kopaska
- Denjaka
