= List of tank landing ships =

== Argentine Navy ==
- ARA BDT-1/Q41
- ARA Cabo San Diego (BDT-2)
- ARA Cabo San Francisco de Paula (BDT-3)
- ARA Cabo San Gonzalo (BDT-4/Q44)
- ARA Cabo San Antonio (Q42)
- ARA Cabo San Isidro (BDT-6/Q46)
- ARA Cabo San Pablo (BDT-7)
- ARA Cabo Pio (BDT-10/Q50)
- ARA Cabo San Sebastian (BDT-11)
- ARA BDT-12
- ARA Cabo Buen Tiempo (BDT-13)
- ARA Cabo San Vincente (BDT-14)

== Brazilian Navy ==
- NDCC Almirante Sabóia (G-25)
- NDCC Mattoso Maia (G-28)
- NDCC Garcia D'Avilla (G-29)
- NDD Ceará (G-30)

== Royal Brunei Navy ==
- KDB Damuam (L-31)
- KDB Puni (L-32)
- KDB Serasa (L-33)
- KDB Teraban (L-34)

== Chilean Navy ==
- BACH Comandante Hemmerdinger (LST-88)
- BACH Comandate Araya (LST-89)

== Ecuadorian Navy ==
- Hualcopo (T-55, T-61, TR-61)

== Hellenic Navy ==
- Aliakmon (L104)

Five Jason-class tank landing ship:

- HS Chios (L 173)
- HS Samos (L 174)
- HS Ikaria (L 175)
- HS Lesvos (L 176)
- HS Rodos (L 177)

== Indonesian Navy ==
Active

LST-542 class:

- KRI Teluk Amboina (503)

Teluk Semangka class:

- KRI Teluk Mandar (514)
- KRI Teluk Sampit (515)
- KRI Teluk Banten (516)
- KRI Teluk Ende (517)

Teluk Gilimanuk class:

- KRI Teluk Gilimanuk (531)
- KRI Teluk Celukan Bawang (532)
- KRI Teluk Cendrawasih (533)
- KRI Teluk Sibolga (536)
- KRI Teluk Manado (537)
- KRI Teluk Hading (538)
- KRI Teluk Parigi (539)
- KRI Teluk Lampung (540)
- KRI Teluk Sangkulirang (542)
- KRI Teluk Cirebon (543)
- KRI Teluk Sabang (544)

Teluk Bintuni class:

- KRI Teluk Kendari (518)
- KRI Teluk Kupang (519)
- KRI Teluk Bintuni (520)
- KRI Teluk Lada (521)
- KRI Teluk Youtefa (522)
- KRI Teluk Palu (523)
- KRI Teluk Calang (524)
- KRI Teluk Weda (526)
- KRI Teluk Wondama (527)

Decommissioned

LST-1 class:

- KRI Teluk Tomini (508)

LST-542 class:

- KRI Teluk Langsa (501)
- KRI Teluk Bayur (502)
- KRI Teluk Kau (504)
- KRI Teluk Manado (505)
- KRI Teluk Ratai (509)
- KRI Teluk Saleh (510)
- KRI Teluk Bone (511)
- KRI Tandjung Nusanive (887)
- KRI Tandjung Radja

Polnocny class:

- KRI Teluk Parigi

Teluk Semangka class:

- KRI Teluk Semangka (512)
- KRI Teluk Penyu (513)

Teluk Gilimanuk class:

- KRI Teluk Berau (534)
- KRI Teluk Peleng (535)
- KRI Teluk Jakarta (541)

KRI Teluk Peleng foundered during a sinking incident on 18 November 2013

== Indian Navy ==
3 ships of Shardul Class:

- INS Shardul (L16)
- INS Kesari (L15)
- INS Airavat (L24)

2 ships of Magar Class:

- INS Magar (L20)
- INS Gharial (L23)

8 ships of Kumbhir Class a variant of the Polnocny C and D Class landing ships:

- INS Ghorpad (L14) (decommissioned)
- INS Kesari (L15) (decommissioned)
- INS Shardul (L16) (decommissioned)
- INS Sharabh (L17) (decommissioned)
- INS Cheetah (L18)
- INS Mahish (L19)
- INS Guldar (L21)
- INS Kumbhir (L22)

The Indian Navy also previously operated the Gharial class the local name for the Polnocny A class landing ship

== Republic of Korea Navy ==
- ROKS Wi Bong (LST-812/676)
- ROKS Su Yong (LST-813/677)
- ROKS Buk Han (LST-815/678)
- ROKS Hwa San (LST-816/679)

== Philippine Navy ==
- BRP Suriago Del Sur (LT-95)
- BRP Lanao Del Norte (LST-504)
- BRP Leyte Del Sur (LT-505)
- BRP Agusan del Sur (LT-54)
- BRP Misamis Oriental (LT-40)
- BRP Sierra Madre (LT-57)

== Russian Navy/Soviet Navy ==
In Russian they are Large Landing Ships, in the U.S. Navy Hull Designation they are LST (Landing Ship, Tank).

- Alligator-class landing ship
- Ropucha I and II-class landing ship
- Ivan Gren-class landing ship

== Sri Lanka Navy ==
- SLNS Shathi (L880)

== Spanish Navy ==
- Juan Carlos I

== Republic of Singapore Navy ==
- RSS Endurance (L-201)
- RSS Excellence (L-202)
- RSS Intrepid (L-203)
- RSS Resolution (L-204)
- RSS Persistence (L-205)
- RSS Perseverance (L-206)
- RSS Endurance (L-207)
- RSS Resolution (L-208)
- RSS Persistence (L-209)
- RSS Endeavor (L-210)

== Republic of Vietnam Navy ==
- RVN Nha Trang (HQ-505)

== Royal Thai Navy ==
- HTMS Sichang (LST 721)
- HTMS Surin (LST 722)

== Turkish Navy ==
- TCG Sarucabey (NL-123)
- TCG Karamürsel (NL-124)
- TCG Osman Gazi (NL-125)
- TCG Bayraktar (L-402)
- TCG Sancaktar (L-403)

== Royal Navy (United Kingdom) ==
During the Second World War most LSTs were unnamed, names were given to those kept in service post war.

- Maracaibo-class Mark I landing ship, tank
  - HMS Misoa (F117)
  - HMS Tasajera (F125)
  - HMS Bachaquero (F110)
- LST Mk 1
  - HMS Boxer
  - HMS Bruiser
  - HMS Thruster
- LST 3001/Frederick Glover
- LST 3002
- LST 3003/HMS Anzio
- LST 3004
- LST 3005
- LST 3006/HMS Tromsø
- LST 3007
- LST 3008
- LST 3009/SS Regiunald Kerr
- LST 3010/HMS Attacker/HMS Empire Cymric - LST Mk 3.
- HMS Avenger (LST 3011)
- LST 3012/HMS Ben Nevis
- LST 3013/HMS Ben Lomond
- LST 3014
- LST 3015/HMS Battler
- LST 3016/HMS Dieppe
- LST 3017/HMAS Tarakan
- LST 3018
- LST 3019/HMS Vaagso
- LST 3020
- LST 3021
- LST 3022
- LST 3023
- LST 3024
- LST 3025/HMS Bruiser
- LST 3026/HMS Charger
- LST 3027/HMS Lofoten
- LST 3028
- LST 3029/HMS Chaser
- LST 3030
- LST 3031
- LST 3032
- LST 3033
- LST 3034
- LST 3035/HMAS Lae
- LST 3036/HMS Puncher
- LST 3037
- LST 3038/HMS Fighter
- LST 3039
- LST 3040
- LST 3041
- LST 3042/HMS Hunter
- LST 3043/HMS Messina
- LST 3044/HMS Narvik
- LST 3045
- LST 3501 - to Australia as HMAS Labuan
- LST 3502
- LST 3503
- LST 3504/HMS Pursuer
- LST 3505/HMS Ravager
- LST 3506
- LST 3507
- LST 3508/HMS Searcher
- LST 3509
- LST 3510/HMS Slinger
- LST 3511/HMS Reggio
- LST 3512
- LST 3513/HMS Salerno
- LST 3514/HMS Smiter
- LST 3515/HMS Stalker
- LST 3516/HMS Striker
- LST 3517/HMS St Nazaire
- LST 3518/HMS Suvla
- LST 3519
- LST 3520/HMS Thruster
- LST 3521
- LST 3522/HMS Tracker
- LST 3523/HMS Trouncer
- LST 3524/HMS Trumpeter
- LST 3525/HMS Walcheren
- LST 3526
- LST 3527
- LST 3528
- LST 3529
- LST 3530
- LST 3531
- LST 3532/HMS Zeebrugge
- LST 3533
- LST 3534

LST 3535 to LST 3575 were all cancelled.

== United States Navy ==
- USS LST-1
- USS LST-5
- USS LST-10
- USS LST-11
- USS LST-12
- USS LST-15
- USS LST-16
- USS LST-17
- USS LST-18
- USS LST-19
- USS LST-20
- USS LST-21
- USS LST-22
- USS LST-23
- USS LST-24
- USS LST-25
- USS LST-26
- USS LST-27
- USS LST-29
- USS LST-31
- USS LST-32
- USS LST-50
- USS LST-57
- USS LST-60
- USS LST-70
- USS LST-81
- USS LST-82
- USS LST-83
- USS LST-84
- USS LST-119
- USS LST-132
- USS LST-136
- USS LST-141
- USS LST-209
- USS LST-231
- USS LST-264
- USS LST-266
- USS LST-279
- USS LST-285
- USS LST-288
- USS LST-306
- USS LST-310
- USS LST-316
- USS LST-317
- USS LST-325 ^{M}
- USS LST-332
- USS LST-340
- USS LST-344
- USS LST-345
- USS LST-350
- USS LST-353
- USS LST-356
- USS LST-357
- USS LST-374
- USS LST-380
- USS LST-389
- USS LST-391
- USS LST-393
- USS LST-400
- USS LST-453
- USS LST-454
- USS LST-455
- USS LST-472
- USS LST-482
- USS LST-483
- USS LST-494
- USS LST-507
- USS LST-511
- USS LST-515
- USS LST-545
- USS LST-546
- USS LST-558
- USS LST-566
- USS LST-569
- USS LST-570
- USS LST-571
- USS LST-572
- USS LST-573
- USS LST-607
- USS LST-622
- USS LST-661
- USS LST-710
- USS LST-712
- USS LST-734
- USS LST-738
- USS LST-749
- USS LST-766
- USS LST-767
- USS LST-801
- USS LST-814
- USS LST-821 ^{BRP}
- USS LST-823
- USS LST-826
- USS LST-828
- USS LST-842
- USS LST-843
- USS LST-848
- USS LST-849
- USS LST-851
- USS LST-853
- USS LST-872
- USS LST-874
- USS LST-875
- USS LST-884
- USS LST-896
- USS LST-900
- USS LST-902
- USS LST-906
- USS LST-911
- USS LST-919
- USS LST-945
- USS LST-980
- USS LST-981
- USS LST-982
- USS LST-983
- USS LST-984
- USS LST-985
- USS LST-986
- USS LST-987
- USS LST-988
- USS LST-989
- USS LST-990
- USS LST-991
- USS LST-992
- USS LST-993
- USS LST-994
- USS LST-995
- USS LST-996
- USS LST-997
- USS LST-998
- USS LST-999
- USS LST-1000
- USS LST-1001
- USS LST-1044
- USS LST-1066
- USS LST-1067
- USS LST-1069
- USS LST-1073
- USS LST-1080
- USS LST-1082
- USS LST-1104
- USS LST-1108
- USS LST-1123
- USS LST-1138
- USS LST-1146
- USS LST-1163
- USS LST-1171

=== Notes ===
^{M} – Preserved as a museum ship in Evansville, IN as the USS LST Ship Memorial Museum.
^{BRP} – Transferred to the Philippines, renamed BRP Sierra Madre, intentionally grounded on the Spratly Islands and likely the last LST still in commission serving as a remote operating base to affirm Philippine sovereignty.
