= USS LST-569 =

1944 LST-542-class tank landing ship

History

United States
- Name: LST-569
- Builder: Missouri Valley Bridge and Iron Company, Evansville, Indiana
- Laid down: 24 March 1944
- Launched: 20 May 1944
- Sponsored by: Mrs. George W. Lamb
- Commissioned: 5 June 1944
- Decommissioned: 13 June 1946
- Stricken: 15 October 1946
- Identification: Hull symbol: LST-569; Code letters: NEWJ
- Honors and awards: 4 × battle stars
- Fate: Sold, 5 December 1947

General characteristics
- Class & type: LST-542-class tank landing ship
- Displacement: 1,625 long tons (1,651 t) (light); 4,080 long tons (4,145 t) (full (seagoing draft with 1,675 short tons (1,520 t) load)
- Length: 328 ft (100 m) oa
- Beam: 50 ft (15 m)
- Draft: Unloaded: 2 ft 4 in (0.71 m) forward; 7 ft 6 in (2.29 m) aft; Full load: 8 ft 2 in (2.49 m) forward; 14 ft 1 in (4.29 m) aft; Landing with 500 short tons (450 t) load: 3 ft 11 in (1.19 m) forward; 9 ft 10 in (3.00 m) aft
- Installed power: 2 × 900 hp (670 kW) General Motors 12-567A diesel engines, 1,700 shp (1,300 kW)
- Propulsion: 1 × Falk main reduction gears; 2 × screws
- Speed: 12 kn (22 km/h; 14 mph)
- Range: 24,000 nmi (44,000 km; 28,000 mi) at 9 kn (17 km/h; 10 mph) while displacing 3,960 long tons (4,024 t)
- Boats & landing craft carried: 2 x LCVPs
- Capacity: 1,600–1,900 st (22,000–27,000 lb; 10,000–12,000 kg) cargo depending on mission
- Troops: 16 officers, 147 enlisted men
- Complement: 7 officers, 104 enlisted men
- Armament: 2 × twin 40 mm (1.6 in) Bofors guns; 4 × single 40mm Bofors guns; 12 × 20 mm (0.79 in) Oerlikon cannons

Service record
- Operations: Battle of Leyte (18 October–6 November 1944); Battle of Luzon (4–17 January 1945); Manila Bay-Bicol operations (29–30 January 1945); Battle of Mindanao (17–23 April and 3–4 May 1945)
- Awards: China Service Medal; American Campaign Medal; Asiatic–Pacific Campaign Medal; World War II Victory Medal; Navy Occupation Service Medal w/Asia Clasp; Philippine Republic Presidential Unit Citation; Philippine Liberation Medal

USS LST-569 was a United States Navy LST-542-class tank landing ship used in the Asiatic-Pacific Theater during World War II.

== Construction and commissioning ==
LST-569 was laid down on 24 March 1944 at Evansville, Indiana, by the Missouri Valley Bridge and Iron Company. She was launched on 20 May 1944, sponsored by Mrs. George W. Lamb, and commissioned on 5 June 1944.

== Service history ==
During the war, LST-569 was assigned to the Pacific Theater of Operations. She took part in the Philippines campaign, participating in the Battle of Leyte landing in October and November 1944, the Invasion of Lingayen Gulf in January 1945, the Manila Bay-Bicol operations at the end of January 1945. On 16 February she left Leyte with Convoy IG 9 en route to Hollandia, arriving 22 February 1945. She then participated in the Battle of Mindanao in April and May 1945, before again traveling from Leyte to Hollandia, this time with Convoy IG 22, from 14 to 20 May 1945.

Following the war, LST-569 performed occupation duty in the Far East and saw service in China until mid-May 1946. The ship was decommissioned on 13 June 1946 and struck from the Navy list on 15 October that same year. On 5 December 1947, she was sold to Bosey, Philippines.

== Honors and awards ==
LST-569 earned four battle stars for her World War II service.

== Bibliography ==
- "LST-569". Dictionary of American Naval Fighting Ships. Naval History and Heritage Command. 3 August 2015.
- "USS LST-569". NavSource. 19 December 2014.
- "Convoy IG.9". Arnold Hague Convoy Database.
- "Convoy IG.22". Arnold Hague Convoy Database.
