= USS LST-546 =

United States Navy LST-542-class tank landing ship

History

United States
- Name: USS LST-546
- Builder: Missouri Valley Bridge and Iron Company, Evansville, Indiana
- Laid down: 20 December 1943
- Launched: 16 February 1944
- Sponsored by: Mrs. W. J. Barbrick
- Commissioned: 27 March 1944
- Decommissioned: Sometime between January 1946 and March 1952
- Fate: Leased to Philippines 15 July 1972; Sold outright to Philippines 1980
- Notes: In non-commissioned service with Military Sea Transportation Service and Military Sealift Command as USNS LST-546 (T-LST-546) 31 March 1952 – 15 July 1972

Philippines
- Name: RPS Surigao Del Sur
- Acquired: Under lease (15 July 1972); Purchased outright 1980
- Decommissioned: 1988
- Fate: Sold for Scrap

General characteristics
- Class & type: LST-542-class LST
- Displacement: 1,625 long tons (1,651 t) light; 4,080 long tons (4,145 t) full seagoing draft with 1,675-ton load
- Length: 328 ft (100 m)
- Beam: 50 ft (15 m)
- Draft: Unloaded 2 ft 4 in (0.71 m) forward; 7 ft 6 in (2.29 m) aft; Full load: 8 ft 2 in (2.49 m) forward; 14 ft 1 in (4.29 m) aft; Landing with 500-ton load: 3 ft 11 in (1.19 m) forward; 9 ft 10 in (3.00 m) aft
- Propulsion: Two diesel engines, two shafts
- Speed: 12 knots (22 km/h; 14 mph) (maximum); 9 knots (17 km/h) (economical)
- Range: 24,000 nautical miles (44,448 kilometerss) at 9 knots while displacing 3,960 tons
- Boats & landing craft carried: 2 x LCVPs
- Capacity: 1,600-1,900 tons cargo depending on mission
- Troops: 16 officers, 147 enlisted men
- Complement: 7 officers, 104 enlisted men
- Armament: 8 × 40 mm guns; 12 × 20 mm guns

USS LST-546 was a United States Navy LST-542-class tank landing ship in commission from 1944 to sometime between 1946 and 1952. From 1952 until 1972 she served in a non-commissioned status in the Military Sea Transportation Service and Military Sealift Command as USNS LST-546 (T-LST-546).

LST-546 was laid down on 20 December 1943 at Evansville, Indiana, by the Missouri Valley Bridge & Iron Co; launched on 16 February 1944; sponsored by Mrs. W. J. Barbrick; and commissioned on 27 March 1944.

== Occupation Duty ==
LST-546 saw no combat action in World War II. Following the war, LST-546 performed occupation duty in the Far East and saw service in China until early January 1946.

== Decommissioning ==
LST-546 was decommissioned sometime between 1946 and 31 March 1952, but the exact date awaits further research.

== Service as USNS LST-546 ==
On 31 March 1952, LST-546 was transferred to the Military Sea Transportation Service, later the Military Sealift Command, where she served in a non-commissioned status as USNS LST-546 until 15 July 1972.

== Transfer to the Philippines ==
On 15 July 1972, LST-546 was taken out of service and transferred under lease to the Republic of the Philippines. The Philippines purchased her outright in 1980. In the Philippine Navy, she served as BRP Surigao del Sur. Her final disposition is unknown.
