= USS LST-70 =

1943 LST-1-class tank landing ship

History

United States
- Name: USS LST-70
- Builder: Jeffersonville Boat & Machine Co., Jeffersonville, Indiana
- Laid down: 13 November 1942
- Launched: 8 February 1943
- Commissioned: 28 May 1943
- Decommissioned: 1 April 1946
- Stricken: 1 May 1946
- Honours and awards: 5 battle stars (WWII)
- Fate: Sold for scrap, 1 July 1946

General characteristics
- Class & type: LST-1-class tank landing ship
- Displacement: 1,625 long tons (1,651 t) light; 4,080 long tons (4,145 t) full
- Length: 328 ft (100 m)
- Beam: 50 ft (15 m)
- Draft: Unloaded: Bow: 2 ft 4 in (0.71 m); Stern: 7 ft 6 in (2.29 m); Loaded : Bow: 8 ft 2 in (2.49 m); Stern: 14 ft 1 in (4.29 m)
- Depth: 8 ft (2.4 m) forward, 14 ft 4 in (4.37 m) aft (full load)
- Propulsion: 2 General Motors 12-567 diesel engines, two shafts, twin rudders
- Speed: 12 knots (22 km/h; 14 mph)
- Boats & landing craft carried: Two or six LCVPs
- Troops: 14-16 officers, 131-147 enlisted men
- Complement: 7-9 officers, 104-120 enlisted men
- Armament: 2 × twin 40 mm gun mounts w/Mk.51 directors; 4 × single 40 mm gun mounts; 12 × single 20 mm gun mounts

USS LST-70 was an LST-1-class tank landing ship in the United States Navy. Like many of her class, she was not named and is properly referred to by her hull designation. LST-70 was manned by a United States Coast Guard crew throughout the Second World War.

LST-70 was laid down on 13 November 1942 at Jeffersonville, Indiana, by the Jeffersonville Boat & Machine Co.; launched on 8 February 1943; sponsored by Mrs. George R. Bickel; and commissioned on 28 May 1943.

== Service history ==
During World War II LST-70 was assigned to the Asiatic-Pacific theater and participated in the occupation and defense of Cape Torokina in November 1943, the Green Islands landing in February 1944, the capture and occupation of Guam in July 1944.

LST-70 participated in the assault and occupation of Iwo Jima in February 1945. In the documentary film To the Shores of Iwo Jima, one of the LCVPs belonging to LST-70 can be seen going ashore at the Battle of Iwo Jima. The boat has PRESS painted on the side of it, and was presumably bringing photographers and reporters ashore.

LST-70 also participated in the assault and occupation of Okinawa Gunto in April and May 1945.

Following the war, LST-70 performed occupation duty in the Far East in October and November 1945. She returned to the United States and was decommissioned on 1 April 1946, and struck from the Naval Register on 1 May 1946. She was sold for scrapping on 1 July 1946 to Arctic Circle Exploration, Inc., of Seattle, Washington.

LST-70 earned five battle stars for World War II service.

== See also ==
- List of United States Navy LSTs
