= USS LST-141 =

1944 LST-1-class tank landing ship

History

United States
- Name: USS LST-141
- Builder: American Bridge Company; Ambridge, Pennsylvania
- Laid down: 24 November 1943
- Launched: 16 January 1944
- Commissioned: 16 February 1944
- Decommissioned: 18 December 1945
- Stricken: 7 February 1946
- Honors and awards: 1 battle star for World War II service
- Fate: Sold for scrapping, 25 May 1948

General characteristics
- Class & type: LST-1-class tank landing ship
- Displacement: 1,625 t.(lt); 4,080 t.(fl) (sea-going draft w/1675 ton load)
- Length: 328 ft (100 m)
- Beam: 50 ft (15 m)
- Draft: fwd × aft; 2 ft 4 in (0.71 m) × 7 ft 6 in (2.29 m) (light); 8 feet 3 inches (2.51 m) × 14 feet 1 inch (4.29 m) (sea-going); 3 feet 11 inches (1.19 m) × 9 feet 10 inches (3.00 m) (landing w/500 ton load)
- Propulsion: 2 × General Motors 12-567, 900hp diesel engines, two shafts, twin rudders
- Speed: 12 kn (22 km/h) (maximum)
- Endurance: 24,000 miles @ 9 kn, disp. 3960 t; (44,000 km @ 17 km/h)
- Boats & landing craft carried: 2 × LCVP
- Capacity: Typical load: 1 LCT, tanks, wheeled and tracked vehicles, artillery, construction equipment and military supplies. A ramp or elevator forward allowed vehicles access to tank deck from main deck
- Troops: 16 officers, 147 enlisted
- Complement: 7 officers, 104 enlisted
- Armament: Typical: 2 × twin 40 mm AA guns w/Mk. 51 directors; 4 × single 40 mm AA guns; 12 × single 20 mm AA guns

USS LST-141 was an LST-1-class tank landing ship built for the United States Navy in World War II. Like most of the ships of her class, she was not named and known only by her designation.

LST-141 was laid down on 24 November 1943 at Ambridge, Pennsylvania, by the American Bridge Company; launched on 16 January 1944; and commissioned on 16 February 1944.

During World War II, LST-141 was assigned to the European Theatre. She sailed across the Atlantic as part of Convoy UGS 36 in April 1944, and took part in the invasion of southern France in August and September 1944.

On 3 December 1944, LST-141 was damaged when she ran aground at Bizerte, Tunisia.

On 5 December, while towing LCT-152, LST-141 encountered a gale off Palermo, Sicily. In the storm LCT-152 was damaged and LST-141 relinquished her tow to ATA-172.

Upon her return to the United States, she was decommissioned on 18 December 1945 and struck from the Navy List on 7 February 1946. On 25 May 1948, the ship was sold to Hughes Bros. Inc., of New York, for scrapping.

LST-141 earned one battle star for World War II service.
