= USS LST-119 =

1943 LST-1-class tank landing ship

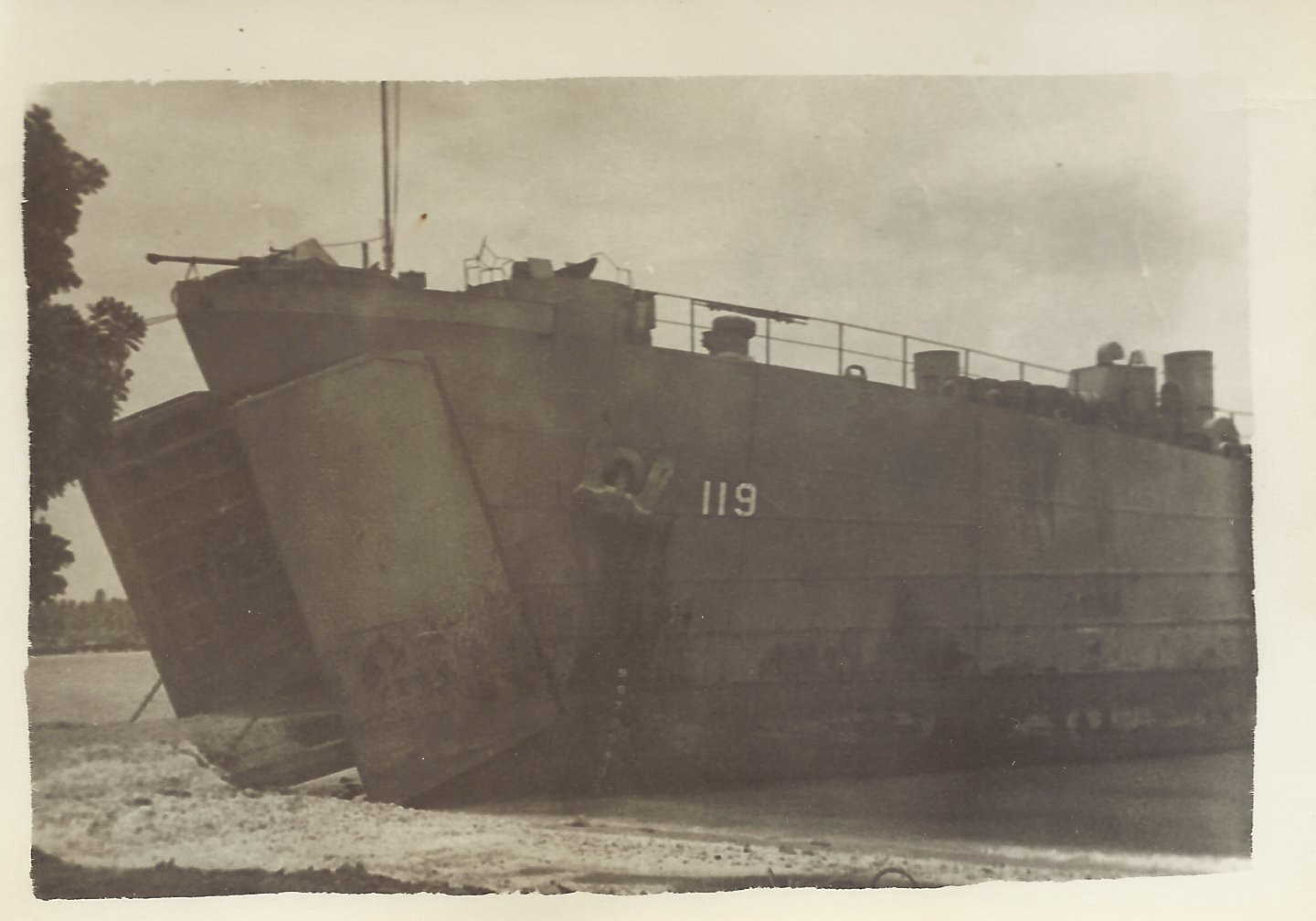

History

United States
- Name: USS LST-119
- Builder: Jeffersonville Boat & Machine Co., Jeffersonville, Indiana
- Launched: 28 July 1943
- Commissioned: 1 September 1943
- Decommissioned: 13 May 1948
- Stricken: 19 June 1946
- Honours and awards: 2 battle stars (WWII)
- Fate: Sold, 17 May 1948

General characteristics
- Class & type: LST-1-class tank landing ship
- Displacement: 1,780 long tons (1,809 t) light; 3,880 long tons (3,942 t) full
- Length: 328 ft (100 m)
- Beam: 50 ft (15 m)
- Draft: Unloaded: Bow: 2 ft 4 in (0.71 m); Stern: 7 ft 6 in (2.29 m); Loaded : Bow: 8 ft 2 in (2.49 m); Stern: 14 ft 1 in (4.29 m)
- Propulsion: 2 General Motors 12-567 diesel engines, two shafts, twin rudders
- Speed: 12 knots (22 km/h; 14 mph)
- Boats & landing craft carried: Two to six LCVPs
- Troops: approx. 140 officers and enlisted
- Complement: 8-10 officers, 100-115 enlisted
- Armament: 5 × 40 mm gun mounts; 6 × 20 mm gun mounts; 2 × .50 cal (12.7 mm) machine guns; 4 × .30 cal (7.62 mm) machine guns

USS LST-119 was a LST-1-class tank landing ship built for the U.S. Navy during World War II. She was designed to carry troops and military equipment to the shores of the battle front and quickly deliver her cargo. She served in the Pacific Ocean and post-war returned home with two battle stars to her credit.

LST-119 was laid down on 12 May 1943 at Jeffersonville, Indiana, by the Jeffersonville Boat & Machine Co.; launched on 28 July 1943; sponsored by Mrs. Gilbert Coughlin; and commissioned on 1 September 1943.

== World War II Pacific Theatre operations ==
During World War II, LST-119 was assigned to the Asiatic-Pacific theater and participated in the following operations:

- Marshall Islands operation: Occupation of Kwajalein and Majuro Atolls, January and February 1944.
- Marianas operation: Capture and occupation of Saipan, June and July 1944.

== Decommissioning ==
Upon her return to the United States, LST-119 was decommissioned on 13 May 1946 and struck from the Navy list on 19 June 1946. On 17 May 1948, she was sold to Robert H. Beattie, Oil Transport Co., New Orleans, Louisiana, for conversion to non-self-propelled operation.

== Awards ==
LST-119 earned two battle stars for World War II service.

== See also ==
- Gallant Bess, a film about a horse rescued in World War II in which LST 119 appears.
