= USS LST-995 =

1944 LST-542-class tank landing ship

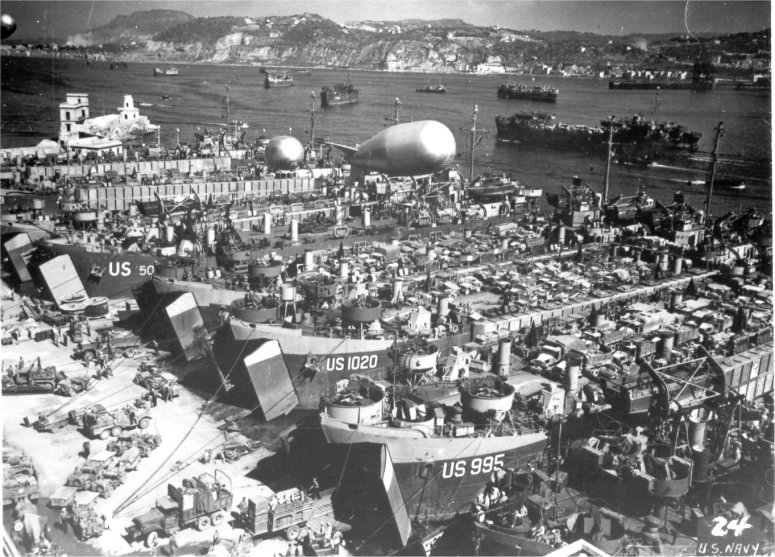
- INSERT ALTTEXT HERE

History

United States
- Name: USS LST-995
- Laid down: 12 March 1944
- Launched: 2 May 1944
- Commissioned: 20 May 1944
- Decommissioned: 15 August 1946
- Fate: Sold, 4 November 1947
- Stricken: 25 September 1946
- Honours and awards: one battle star

Argentina
- Name: ARA Cabo San Diego BDT-2
- Acquired: 14 November 1948
- Out of service: 1968
- Identification: IMO number: 5402033

General characteristics
- Class & type: LST-542-class LST
- Displacement: 1,490 tons (light); 4,080 tons (full load of 2,100 tons)
- Length: 328 ft (100 m)
- Beam: 50 ft (15 m)
- Draft: 8 ft (2.4 m) forward; 14 ft 4 in (4.37 m) aft (full load)
- Propulsion: Two diesel engines, two shafts
- Speed: 10.8 knots (20 km/h) (max); 9 knots (17 km/h) (econ)
- Complement: 7 officers, 204 enlisted
- Armament: 8 × 40 mm guns; 12 × 20 mm guns

USS LST-995 was an LST-542-class tank landing ship in the United States Navy. Like many of her class, she was not named and is properly referred to by her hull designation.

== Service history ==
LST-995 was laid down on 12 March 1944 at the Boston Navy Yard; launched on 2 May 1944; and commissioned on 20 May 1944.

During World War II, LST-995 was assigned to the European theater and participated in Operation Dragoon, the invasion of southern France, in August and September 1944. Following the war, she performed occupation duty in the Far East until early April 1946. She returned to the United States and was decommissioned on 15 August 1946 and struck from the Navy list on 25 September that same year. On 4 November 1947, the ship was sold to the Northwest Merchandising Service, and was transferred to Argentina, where she was named Don Nicolas.

LST-995 earned one battle star for World War II service.

=== Argentine Navy Service ===
In Argentine Navy service beginning in 1948, Don Nicolas was redesignated BDT-2 (Buque Desembarco de Tanques), and was named ARA Cabo San Diego. She was retired in 1966.
