= USS LST-607 =

United States Navy Tank landing ship

History

United States
- Name: USS LST-607
- Builder: Chicago Bridge and Iron Company, Seneca, Illinois
- Laid down: 2 December 1943
- Launched: 7 April 1944
- Sponsored by: Mrs. John Pirok
- Commissioned: 24 April 1944
- Decommissioned: 11 January 1946
- In service: With Military Sea Transportation Service as USNS LST-607 (T-LST-607) from 31 March 1952
- Fate: Transferred to Philippine Navy 13 September 1976
- Stricken: 1 November 1973

Philippines
- Name: BRP Leyte del Sur
- Acquired: 13 September 1976
- Stricken: prior 1990

General characteristics
- Class & type: LST-542-class LST
- Displacement: 1,490 tons (light); 4,080 tons (full load of 2,100 tons)
- Length: 328 ft (100 m)
- Beam: 50 ft (15 m)
- Draft: 8 ft (2.4 m) forward; 14 ft 4 in (4.37 m) aft (full load)
- Propulsion: Two diesel engines, two shafts
- Speed: 10.8 knots (20 km/h) (max); 9 knots (17 km/h) (econ)
- Complement: 7 officers, 204 enlisted
- Armament: 8 × 40 mm guns; 12 × 20 mm guns

USS LST-607 was a United States Navy LST-542-class tank landing ship in commission from 1944 to 1946. She later served in a non-commissioned status in the Military Sea Transportation Service as USNS LST-607 (T-LST-607).

== Construction and commissioning ==
LST-607 was laid down on 2 December 1943 at Seneca Illinois, by the Chicago Bridge and Iron Company. She was launched on 7 April 1944, sponsored by Mrs. John Pirok;, and commissioned on 24 April 1944.

== World War II service ==
During World War II, LST-607 was assigned to the Pacific Theater of Operations and participated in the capture and occupation of the southern Palau Islands in September and October 1944.

Following the war, LST-607 performed occupation duty in the Far East until early January 1946. She was decommissioned on 11 January 1946.

== Later career ==
On 31 March 1952, LST-607 was transferred to the Military Sea Transportation Service, in which she served as USNS LST-607 (T-LST-607).

USNS LST-607 was transferred to the Philippine Navy on 13 September 1976. Her later fate is unknown.

== Awards and honors ==
LST-607 earned one battle star for World War II service.

== Media Appearance ==
- This ship made a brief(at approximately 59:24) appearance in a scene from the 1977 biographical movie MacArthur (film).
