= USS LST-712 =

1944 LST-542-class tank landing ship

History

United States
- Name: USS LST-712
- Builder: Jeffersonville Boat & Machine Co., Jeffersonville, Indiana
- Laid down: 22 May 1944
- Launched: 7 July 1944
- Commissioned: 2 August 1944
- Decommissioned: 20 May 1946
- Stricken: 28 August 1946
- Honors and awards: 2 battle stars (World War II)
- Fate: Sold for scrapping, 27 May 1948

General characteristics
- Class & type: LST-542-class tank landing ship
- Displacement: 1,625 long tons (1,651 t) light; 3,640 long tons (3,698 t) full
- Length: 328 ft (100 m)
- Beam: 50 ft (15 m)
- Draft: Unloaded : 2 ft 4 in (0.71 m) forward; 7 ft 6 in (2.29 m) aft; Loaded : 8 ft 2 in (2.49 m) forward; 14 ft 1 in (4.29 m) aft
- Propulsion: 2 × General Motors 12-567 diesel engines, two shafts, twin rudders
- Speed: 12 knots (22 km/h; 14 mph)
- Boats & landing craft carried: 2 × LCVPs
- Troops: 8-10 officers, 89-100 enlisted men
- Complement: Approximately 130 officers and enlisted men
- Armament: 1 × single 3"/50 caliber gun; 8 × 40 mm guns; 12 × 20 mm guns

USS LST-712 was a LST-542-class tank landing ship built for the United States Navy during World War II.

The ship was laid down on 22 May 1944 at the Jefferson Boat & Machine Company in Jeffersonville, Indiana; launched on 7 July 1944, sponsored by Mrs. Elma Mae Goodhue, and commissioned on 2 August 1944.

== Service history ==
During World War II, LST-712 was assigned to the Asiatic-Pacific Theater. It participated in two operations: the invasion of Lingayen Gulf in January 1945, and the assault and occupation of Okinawa Gunto, which took place from April to June 1945. Following the war, LST-712 performed occupation duty in the Far East until mid-December 1945.

She returned to the United States and was decommissioned on 20 May 1946, and struck from the Navy List on 28 August that same year. On 27 May 1948, the ship was sold to the Basalt Rock Company of Napa, California, and subsequently scrapped.

== Awards ==
USS LST-712 earned two battle stars for World War II service.
