= USS LST-998 =

1944 LST-542-class tank landing ship

History

United States
- Name: USS LST-998
- Laid down: 8 April 1944
- Launched: 14 May 1944
- Commissioned: 29 June 1944
- Decommissioned: 26 June 1946
- Fate: Sold, 4 November 1948
- Stricken: 31 July 1946
- Honours and awards: one battle star

Argentina
- Name: ARA Cabo San Francisco de Paula BDT-3
- Acquired: 14 November 1948
- Out of service: 1968
- Identification: IMO number: 5402057

General characteristics
- Class & type: LST-542-class LST
- Displacement: 1,490 tons (light); 4,080 tons (full load of 2,100 tons)
- Length: 328 ft (100 m)
- Beam: 50 ft (15 m)
- Draft: 8 ft (2.4 m) forward; 14 ft 4 in (4.37 m) (full load)
- Propulsion: Two diesel engines, two shafts
- Speed: 10.8 knots (20 km/h) (max); 9 knots (17 km/h) (econ)
- Complement: 7 officers, 204 enlisted
- Armament: 8 × 40 mm guns; 12 × 20 mm guns

USS LST-998 was an LST-542-class tank landing ship in the United States Navy. Like many of her class, she was not named and is properly referred to by her hull designation.

== History ==
LST-998 was laid down on 8 April 1944 at the Boston Navy Yard; launched on 14 May 1944, sponsored by Miss Olga M. Lessa; and commissioned on 29 May 1944.

LST-998 apparently did not see combat service during World War II.

Following World War II, LST-998 performed occupation duty in the Far East and saw service in China until late March 1946. She returned to the United States and was decommissioned on 26 June 1946 and struck from the Navy list on 31 July that same year. On 4 November 1948, the ship was sold to the Northwest Merchandising Service, renamed Don Ernesto and entered service in Argentina.

=== Argentine service ===
In Argentine Navy service, Don Ernesto was redesignated BDT-3 (Buque Desembarco de Tanques), and was named ARA Cabo San Francisco de Paula. She was retired in 1968.
