= USS LST-1001 =

U.S. World War II-era tank landing ship

History

United States
- Name: USS LST-1001
- Builder: Boston Navy Yard
- Laid down: 18 April 1944
- Launched: 26 May 1944
- Commissioned: 20 June 1944
- Decommissioned: 26 February 1946
- Stricken: 19 June 1946
- Honours and awards: 1 battle star (World War II)
- Fate: Sold for scrapping, 23 October 1947

General characteristics
- Class & type: LST-542-class tank landing ship
- Displacement: 1,490 long tons (1,514 t) light; 4,080 long tons (4,145 t) full
- Length: 328 ft (100 m)
- Beam: 50 ft (15 m)
- Draft: 8 ft (2.4 m) forward; 14 ft 4 in (4.37 m) aft
- Propulsion: 2 × General Motors 12-567 diesel engines, two shafts
- Speed: 10.8 knots (20.0 km/h; 12.4 mph)
- Complement: 7 officers, 104 enlisted men
- Armament: 6 × 40 mm guns; 6 × 20 mm guns

USS LST-1001 was an LST-542-class tank landing ship in the United States Navy. Like many of her class, she was not named and is properly referred to by her hull designation.

LST-1001 was laid down on 26 February 1944 at the Boston Navy Yard; launched on 27 March 1944; and commissioned on 20 June 1944.

== Service history ==
During World War II LST-1001 was first assigned to the European Theater (convoy HXM 30), and later reassigned to the Asiatic-Pacific Theater and participated in the assault and occupation of Okinawa Gunto in May and June 1945.

Following World War II LST-1001 performed occupation duty in the Far East until mid-September 1945. She returned to the United States and was decommissioned on 26 February 1946 and struck from the Navy list on 19 June that same year. On 23 October 1947, the ship was sold to the New Orleans Shipwrecking Corp., Chicago, Illinois, for scrapping.

LST-1001 earned one battle star for World War II service.
