= USS LST-991 =

1944 LST-542-class tank landing ship

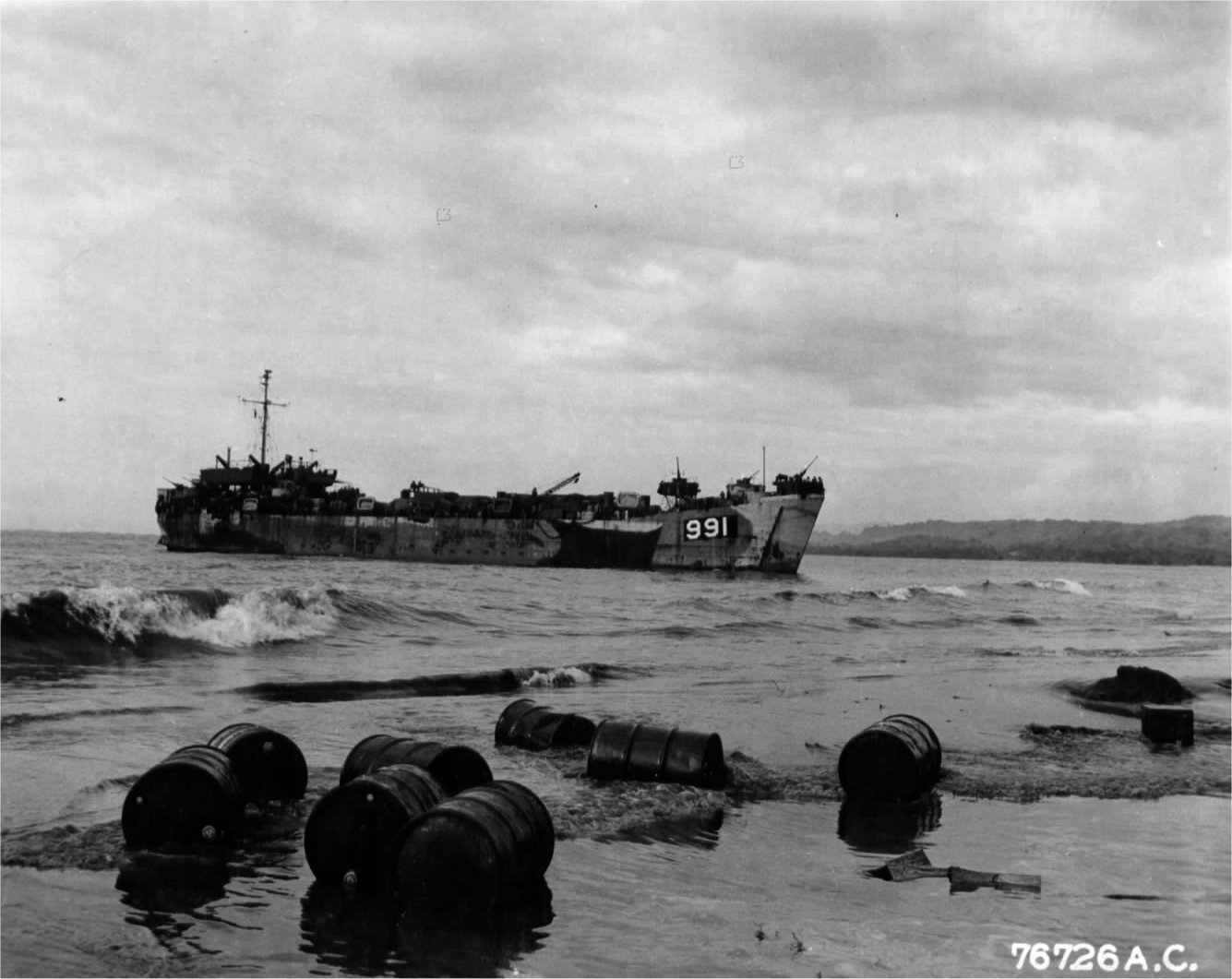
- LST-991 landing elements of the 1876th Engineer Aviation Battalion at Luzon, Philippine Islands, during the Luzon Operation, circa January 1945

History

United States
- Name: USS LST-991
- Builder: Boston Navy Yard
- Laid down: 10 February 1944
- Launched: 27 March 1944
- Commissioned: 6 May 1944
- Decommissioned: 3 May 1946
- Honours and awards: 5 battle stars (World War II)
- Fate: Transferred to the Republic of China, 1946

History

Taiwan
- Acquired: 1946
- Fate: Believed sunk by torpedo boats of the People's Liberation Army Navy

General characteristics
- Class & type: LST-542-class tank landing ship

USS LST-991 was an LST-542-class tank landing ship in the United States Navy. Like many of her class, she was not named and is properly referred to by her hull designation.

LST-991 was laid down on 26 February 1944 at the Boston Navy Yard; launched on 27 March 1944; sponsored by Dorothy Ann Govostes; and commissioned on 6 May 1944.

== Service history ==
During World War II, LST-991 participated in the following operations:

- Capture and occupation of southern Palau Islands within Pacific Ocean Areas — September and October 1944
- Leyte landings — October and November 1944
- Lingayen Gulf landings — January 1945
- Zambales-Subic Bay — January 1945
- Assault and occupation of Okinawa Gunto — April through June 1945

Following the war, LST-991 performed occupation duty in the Far East and saw service in China. Decommissioned on 3 May 1946, at Shanghai, she was transferred to the U.S. Department of State for immediate transfer to the United Nations Relief and Rehabilitation Commission for service in Republic of China.

The ship is believed to have been torpedoed and sunk off of Quemoy Island by torpedo boats of the Chinese People's Liberation Army Navy.

LST-991 earned five battle stars for World War II service.
