= USS LST-996 =

American navy tank landing ship

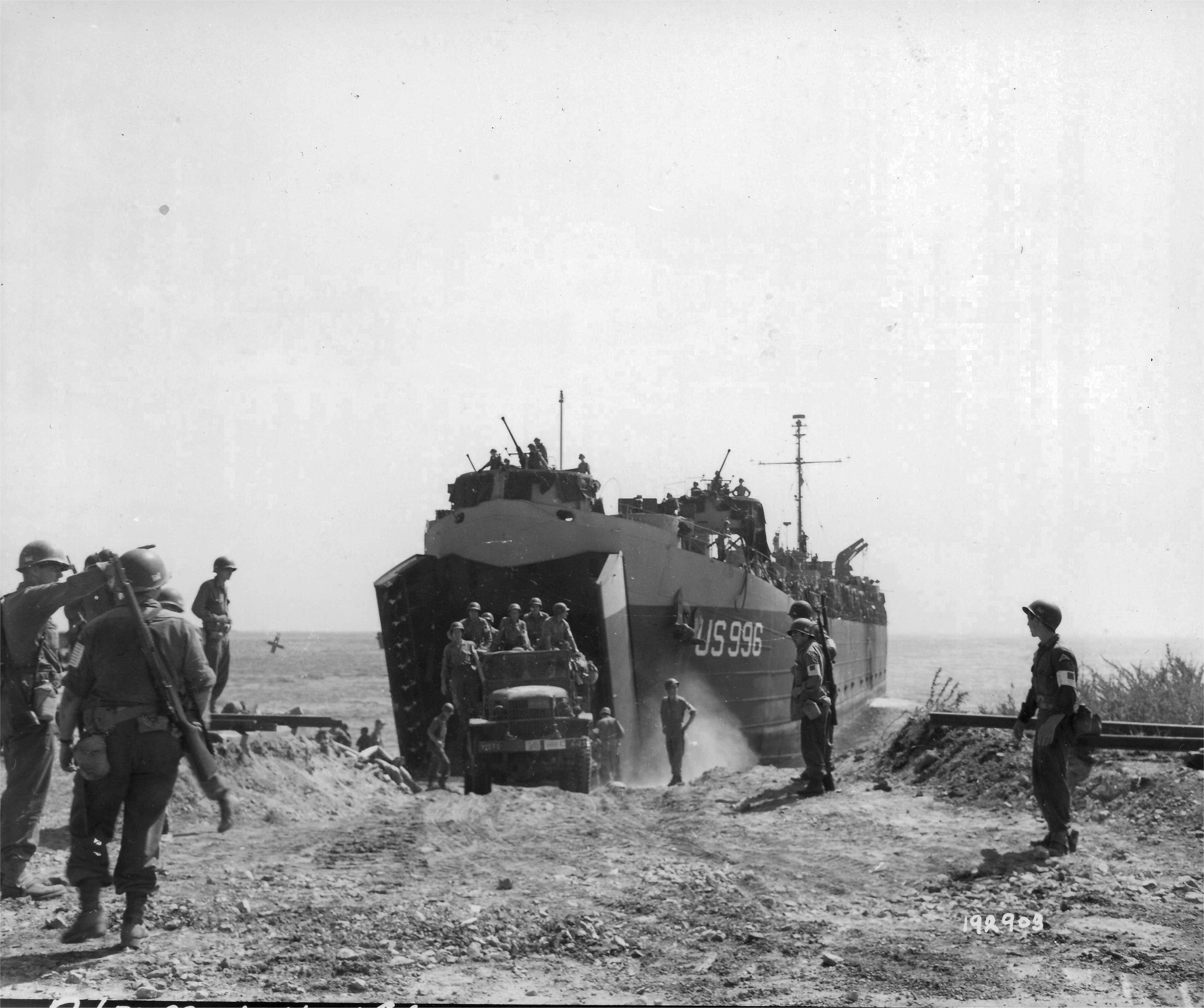
- LST-996 offloads a truck during the invasion of southern France, 15 August 1944

History

United States
- Name: USS LST-999
- Laid down: [27 March 1944
- Launched: 2 May 1944
- Commissioned: 23 May 1944
- Decommissioned: 22 April 1947
- Fate: Sold, 12 October 1947
- Stricken: 8 May 1946
- Honours and awards: two battle stars

General characteristics
- Class & type: LST-542-class LST
- Displacement: 1,490 tons (light); 4,080 tons (full load of 2,100 tons)
- Length: 328 ft (100 m)
- Beam: 50 ft (15 m)
- Draft: 8 ft (2.4 m) forward; 14 ft 4 in (4.37 m) aft (full load)
- Propulsion: Two diesel engines, two shafts
- Speed: 10.8 knots (20 km/h) (max); 9 knots (17 km/h) (econ)
- Complement: 7 officers, 204 enlisted
- Armament: 8 × 40 mm guns; 12 × 20 mm guns

USS LST-996 was an LST-542-class tank landing ship in the United States Navy. Like many of her class, she was not named and is properly referred to by her hull designation.

LST-996 was laid down on 27 March 1944 at the Boston Navy Yard; launched on 2 May 1944; sponsored by Mrs. Ursula A. Hall; and commissioned on 23 May 1944.

During World War II, LST-996 was assigned to the European theater and participated in the Operation Dragoon, the invasion of southern France, in August and September 1944. Transferred to the Asiatic-Pacific theater, she engaged in the assault and occupation of Okinawa Gunto in April through June 1945. She returned to the United States and was decommissioned on 22 April 1946 and struck from the Navy list on 8 May that same year. On 12 October 1947, the ship was sold to the Hugo Neu Steel Products Corp., New York City, N.Y., for scrapping.

LST-996 earned two battle stars for World War II service.
