= USS LST-766 =

1944 LST-542-class tank landing ship

History

United States
- Name: USS LST-766
- Builder: American Bridge Company, Ambridge, Pennsylvania
- Laid down: 13 July 1944
- Launched: 30 August 1944
- Commissioned: 25 September 1944
- Decommissioned: 19 March 1946
- Stricken: 5 June 1946
- Identification: IMO number: 5072369
- Honours and awards: 1 battle star (World War II)
- Fate: Sold, 24 December 1946

General characteristics
- Class & type: LST-542 class
- Type: Landing Ship, Tank
- Displacement: 1,625 long tons (1,651 t) light; 4,080 long tons (4,145 t) full
- Length: 328 ft (100 m)
- Beam: 50 ft (15 m)
- Draft: 8 ft (2.4 m) forward; 14 ft 4 in (4.37 m) aft
- Propulsion: 2 × General Motors 12-567 diesel engines, twin shafts/rudders
- Speed: 11.6 knots (21.5 km/h; 13.3 mph)
- Range: 24,000 nm at 9 knots
- Troops: 163
- Complement: 7 officers, 104 enlisted men
- Armament: 7 × 40 mm guns; 6 × 20 mm guns; 2 × .50 cal (12.7 mm) machine guns; 4 × .30 cal (7.62 mm) machine guns

USS LST-766 was an LST-542-class Landing Ship, Tank in the United States Navy during World War II that took part in the amphibious landings during the war in the Far East.

== Ship history ==
Under an agreement made between the Commandant and the Chief of Naval Operations, the US Coast Guard supplied officers and crewmen for a number of LSTs. Even with Coast Guard crews all LSTs were commissioned US Navy vessels. Like most LSTs, LST-766 did not receive a name and is properly referred to by her hull designation.

LST-766 was laid down by the American Bridge Co., in Ambridge, Pa on 13 July 1944. The ship was launched on 30 August 1944, sponsored by Mrs. C. E. Egeler. She made her way down the Ohio and Mississippi rivers to the Gulf of Mexico through New Orleans. On 25 September 1944, she was commissioned under the command of LT Lester W. Newton, USCGR.

During early October 1944, she underwent sea trials then proceeded to Gulfport, Mississippi for outfitting. She passed through the Panama Canal to San Diego and then on to Pearl Harbor arriving on 10 December 1944. After training in amphibious operations near the Hawaiian islands she joined the Pacific invasion forces off Iwo Jima on 19 February 1945. After completing operations at Iwo Jima she returned to Hawaii.

After further training exercises she set out for Okinawa (via Eniwetok, Guam and Saipan) in April, arriving on 14 July 1945. Between mid-August and late September 1945, LST-766 was engaged in transportation duties between Saipan and Guam, From Okinawa she was deployed to Qingdao, China. There she broke free of her anchor, and was grounded but freed without damage. She returned to Guam and then, in November 1945 after the end of the war, returned to the United States, via Pearl Harbor, arriving in San Francisco on 16 December 1945. The majority of her Coastguard Crew was discharged, and she was decommissioned there on 19 March 1946 and ultimately sold for commercial use.

In December 1946 it was sold to the Minsheng Company (Chinese: 民生公司) in China, for use as a merchant ship, where it was given the name "Ningyuan" (Chinese: 宁远). In 1950, the ship was initially docked in Hong Kong, however was relocated to Shanghai on June 15, 1950. In 1953, after the establishment of the Shanghai Maritime Administration, the ship was renamed "Heping No.16" (Chinese: 和平16号); later in 1954, it was transferred to the Yangtze River Waterway Administration and renamed "Renmin No.13" (Chinese: 人民13号). In 1980 it ceased operation with the waterway administration and was acquired by the Wuhan Changjiang Shipping Company (Chinese: 武汉长江轮船有限公司) and transformed into a floating workshop pontoon, remaining parked in Wuhan until it was retired on May 28, 2019.

LST-766 was awarded one battle star for her service during World War II.
