= USS LST-1108 =

1945 LST-542-class tank landing ship

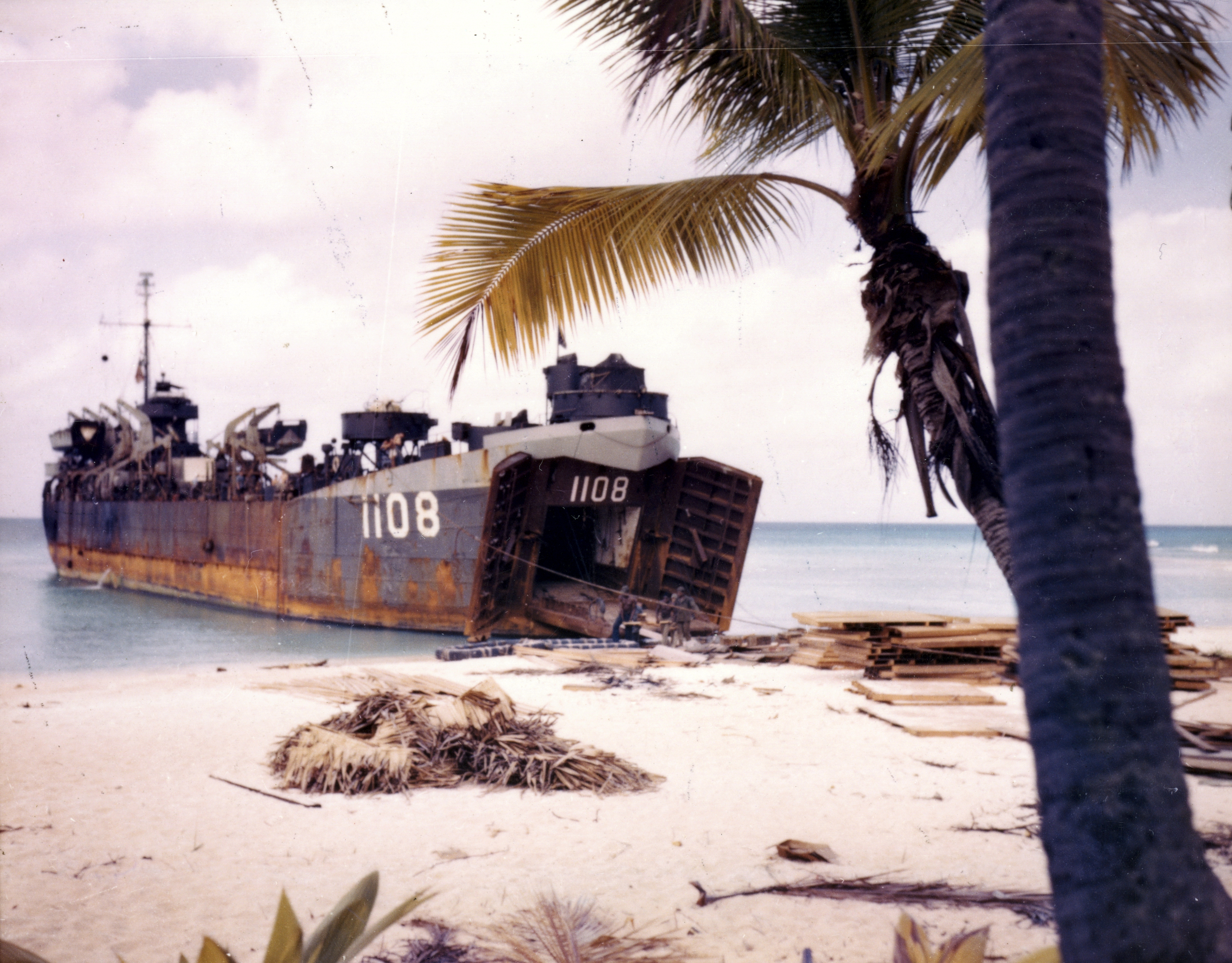
- LST-1108 at Rongerik Atoll on 8 March 1946, while assisting in the evacuation of Bikini Atoll's indigenous population ahead of Operation Crossroads.

History

United States
- Name: USS LST-1108
- Laid down: 16 December 1944
- Launched: 1 February 1945
- Commissioned: 27 February 1945
- Decommissioned: 15 August 1946
- Fate: Sold, 10 January 1948
- Stricken: 25 September 1946

Argentina
- Name: ARA Cabo San Sebastian (BDT-11)
- Acquired: 1948
- Out of service: 1966

General characteristics
- Class & type: LST-542-class LST
- Displacement: 1,490 tons (light); 4,080 tons (full load of 2,100 tons)
- Length: 328 ft (100 m)
- Beam: 50 ft (15 m)
- Draft: 8 ft (2.4 m) forward; 14 ft 4 in (4.37 m) aft (full load)
- Propulsion: Two diesel engines, two shafts
- Speed: 10.8 knots (20 km/h) (max); 9 knots (17 km/h) (econ)
- Complement: 7 officers, 204 enlisted
- Armament: 8 × 40 mm guns; 12 × 20 mm guns

USS LST-1108 was an LST-542-class tank landing ship in the United States Navy. Like many of her class, she was not named and is properly referred to by her hull designation.

== Operational history ==
LST-1108 was laid down on 16 December 1944 at Evansville, Indiana, by the Missouri Valley Bridge & Iron Co.; launched on 1 February 1945; sponsored by Mrs. Edward H. Barnard; and commissioned on 27 February 1945.

Following World War II, LST-1108 performed occupation duty in the Far East until early December 1945. She was decommissioned on 15 August 1946 and struck from the Navy list on 25 September that same year. On 10 January 1948, the ship was sold for service in Argentina and renamed Doña Irma.

=== Argentine service ===
In Argentine Navy service, Doña Irma was renamed ARA Cabo San Sebastian (BDT-11) (Buque Desembarco de Tanques). She was retired in 1966.
