= USS LST-1104 =

American naval vessel

History

United States
- Name: USS LST-1104
- Laid down: 1 December 1944
- Launched: 17 January 1945
- Commissioned: 8 February 1945
- Decommissioned: 8 July 1946
- Fate: Sold, 28 April 1947
- Stricken: 22 May 1947
- Honours and awards: one battle star

Argentina
- Name: Samba, BDT-12
- Acquired: 28 April 1947
- Out of service: 1958

General characteristics
- Class & type: LST-542-class LST
- Displacement: 1,490 tons (light); 4,080 tons (full load of 2,100 tons)
- Length: 328 ft (100 m)
- Beam: 50 ft (15 m)
- Draft: 8 ft (2.4 m) forward; 14 ft 4 in (4.37 m) aft (full load)
- Propulsion: Two diesel engines, two shafts
- Speed: 10.8 knots (20 km/h) (max); 9 knots (17 km/h) (econ)
- Complement: 7 officers, 204 enlisted
- Armament: 8 × 40 mm guns; 12 × 20 mm guns

USS LST-1104 was an LST-542-class tank landing ship in the United States Navy. Like many of her class, she was not named and is properly referred to by her hull designation.

== Operational history ==
LST-1104 was laid down on 1 December 1944 at Evansville, Indiana, by the Missouri Valley Bridge & Iron Co.; launched on 17 January 1945; sponsored by Mrs. Walter G. Koch; and commissioned on 8 February 1945.

During World War II, LST-1104 was assigned to the Asiatic-Pacific theater and participated in the assault and occupation of Okinawa Gunto in June 1945. Following the war, she performed occupation duty in the Far East and saw service in China until early April 1946. She was decommissioned on 8 July 1946. On 28 April 1947, the ship was sold to the Quarterman Corp. for operation, and sailed under the Panamanian flag. She was struck from the Navy list on 22 May 1947.

LST-1104 earned one battle star for World War II service.

=== Argentine service ===
In Argentine service, LST-1104 was briefly renamed Samba, possibly only before she was taken up by the Argentine Navy, where she was redesignated BDT-12. She was retired in 1958.
