= USS LST-571 =

1944 LST-542-class tank landing ship

History

United States
- Name: LST-571
- Builder: Missouri Valley Bridge and Iron Company, Evansville, Indiana
- Laid down: 14 April 1944
- Launched: 25 May 1944
- Sponsored by: Mrs. Joseph H. Hayes
- Commissioned: 14 June 1944
- Decommissioned: 12 March 1946
- Stricken: 12 April 1946
- Identification: Hull symbol:LST-571; Code letters:NEWN
- Honors and awards: 2 × battle stars
- Fate: Sold, 17 August 1948

General characteristics
- Class & type: LST-542-class tank landing ship
- Displacement: 1,625 long tons (1,651 t) (light); 4,080 long tons (4,145 t) (full (seagoing draft with 1,675 short tons (1,520 t) load)
- Length: 328 ft (100 m) oa
- Beam: 50 ft (15 m)
- Draft: Unloaded: 2 ft 4 in (0.71 m) forward; 7 ft 6 in (2.29 m) aft; Full load: 8 ft 2 in (2.49 m) forward; 14 ft 1 in (4.29 m) aft; Landing with 500 short tons (450 t) load: 3 ft 11 in (1.19 m) forward; 9 ft 10 in (3.00 m) aft
- Installed power: 2 × 900 hp (670 kW) General Motors 12-567A diesel engines, 1,700 shp (1,300 kW)
- Propulsion: 1 × Falk main reduction gears; 2 × screws
- Speed: 12 kn (22 km/h; 14 mph)
- Range: 24,000 nmi (44,000 km; 28,000 mi) at 9 kn (17 km/h; 10 mph) while displacing 3,960 long tons (4,024 t)
- Boats & landing craft carried: 2 x LCVPs
- Capacity: 1,600–1,900 st (22,000–27,000 lb; 10,000–12,000 kg) cargo depending on mission
- Troops: 16 officers, 147 enlisted men
- Complement: 13 officers, 104 enlisted men
- Armament: 2 × twin 40 mm (1.6 in) Bofors guns; 4 × single 40mm Bofors guns; 12 × 20 mm (0.79 in) Oerlikon cannons

Service record
- Operations: Battle of Luzon Lingayen Gulf landings (9 January 1945); Battle of Okinawa (1 April–18 June 1945)
- Awards: American Campaign Medal; Asiatic–Pacific Campaign Medal; World War II Victory Medal; Navy Occupation Service Medal w/Asia Clasp; Philippine Republic Presidential Unit Citation; Philippine Liberation Medal

USS LST-571 was a United States Navy LST-542-class tank landing ship used in the Asiatic-Pacific Theater during World War II.

== Construction and commissioning ==
LST-571 was laid down on 14 April 1944 at Evansville, Indiana, by the Missouri Valley Bridge and Iron Company. She was launched on 25 May 1944, sponsored by Mrs. Joseph H. Hayes, and commissioned on 14 June 1944.

== Service history ==
During the war, LST-571 was assigned to the Pacific Theater of Operations. She took part in the Philippines campaign, participating in the Invasion of Lingayen Gulf in January 1945 and the Battle of Okinawa in April through June 1945.

Following the war, LST-571 performed occupation duty in the Far East until early December 1945. Upon her return to the United States, LST-571 was decommissioned on 12 March 1946 and struck from the Navy list on 12 April that same year. On 17 August 1948, the ship was sold to the Port Houston Iron Works, Inc., of Houston, Texas, for non-self-propelled operation.

She briefly appears in the James Bond Film 'Live and Let Die'; being apparently blown up after a speedboat drives in through her open bows, which then explodes.

== Honors and awards ==
LST-571 earned two battle stars for her World War II service.

== Sources ==
- "LST-571". Dictionary of American Naval Fighting Ships. Naval History and Heritage Command.
- "USS LST-571". NavSource. 19 December 2014.
