= USS LST-622 =

1944 LST-542-class tank landing ship

History

United States
- Name: USS LST-622
- Builder: Chicago Bridge and Iron Company
- Laid down: 15 March 1944
- Launched: 8 June 1944
- Sponsored by: Mrs. Ray Menefee
- Commissioned: 26 June 1944
- Decommissioned: 14 March 1946
- Stricken: 12 April 1946
- Fate: Sold for scrapping, 13 April 1948, to Kaiser Co., Inc., Seattle, WA.

General characteristics
- Class & type: LST-542-class LST
- Displacement: 1,625 tons (light); 4,080 tons (full load of 1,675 tons)
- Length: 328 ft (100 m)
- Beam: 50 ft (15 m)
- Draft: Unloaded : 2 ft 4 in (0.71 m) forward; 7 ft 6 in (2.29 m) aft; Loaded : 8 ft 2 in (2.49 m) forward; 14 ft 1 in (4.29 m) aft; Landing: 3 ft 11 in (1.19 m) forward; 9 ft 10 in (3.00 m) aft (500 ton load)
- Propulsion: 2 × General Motors 12-567, 900hp diesel engines, two shafts, twin rudders
- Speed: 12 kn (22 km/h) (maximum)
- Range: 24,000 miles (39,000 km) @ 9 knots. while displacing 3,960 tons
- Boats & landing craft carried: 2 × LCVPs
- Complement: 7 officers, 104 enlisted
- Armament: 2 × twin 40 mm guns w/Mk. 51 directors; 4 × single 40 mm guns; 12 × 20 mm guns

USS LST-622 was a United States Navy LST-542-class tank landing ship in commission from 1944 to 1946.

== Construction and commissioning ==
LST-622 was laid down on 15 March 1944 at Seneca, Illinois, by the Chicago Bridge and Iron Company. She was launched on 8 June 1944, and commissioned on 26 June 1944.

== World War II service ==
During World War II, LST-622 was assigned to the Asiatic-Pacific Theater and participated in the Lingayen Gulf landing, January 1945, and the assault and occupation of Okinawa Gunto, from March through June 1945.

She was decommissioned on 11 January 1946.

== Awards and honors ==
LST-622 earned two battle stars for World War II service.
