= USS LST-734 =

WWII US naval vessel

History

United States
- Name: LST-734
- Builder: Dravo Corporation, Pittsburgh, Pennsylvania
- Laid down: 25 January 1944
- Launched: 4 March 1944
- Commissioned: 22 April 1945
- Decommissioned: 7 May 1946
- Stricken: 5 June 1946
- Honors and awards: Four battle stars
- Fate: Sold to Argentina, 24 May 1948

Argentina
- Name: Cabo San Vincente
- Namesake: Cape St. Vincent, Portugal
- Acquired: 1948
- Commissioned: 1948
- Decommissioned: 1966
- Stricken: 1969
- Identification: 276-B BDT-14
- Fate: Scrapped

General characteristics
- Class & type: LST-542-class tank landing ship
- Displacement: 1,625 long tons (1,651 t) (light); 4,080 long tons (4,145 t) (full (seagoing draft with 1,675 short tons (1,520 t) load); 2,366 long tons (2,404 t) (beaching)
- Length: 328 ft (100 m) oa
- Beam: 50 ft (15 m)
- Draft: Unloaded: 2 ft 4 in (0.71 m) forward; 7 ft 6 in (2.29 m) aft; Full load: 8 ft 3 in (2.51 m) forward; 14 ft 1 in (4.29 m) aft; Landing with 500 short tons (450 t) load: 3 ft 11 in (1.19 m) forward; 9 ft 10 in (3.00 m) aft; Limiting 11 ft 2 in (3.40 m); Maximum navigation 14 ft 1 in (4.29 m)
- Installed power: 2 × 900 hp (670 kW) Electro-Motive Diesel 12-567A diesel engines; 1,800 shp (1,300 kW)
- Propulsion: 1 × Falk main reduction gears; 2 × Propellers
- Speed: 11.6 kn (21.5 km/h; 13.3 mph)
- Range: 24,000 nmi (44,000 km; 28,000 mi) at 9 kn (17 km/h; 10 mph) while displacing 3,960 long tons (4,024 t)
- Boats & landing craft carried: 2 x LCVPs
- Capacity: 1,600–1,900 short tons (3,200,000–3,800,000 lb; 1,500,000–1,700,000 kg) cargo depending on mission
- Troops: 16 officers, 147 enlisted men
- Complement: 13 officers, 104 enlisted men
- Armament: Varied, ultimate armament; 2 × twin 40 mm (1.57 in) Bofors guns; 4 × single 40 mm Bofors guns; 12 × 20 mm (0.79 in) Oerlikon cannons

USS LST-734 was an LST-542-class tank landing ship in the United States Navy. Like many of her class, she was not named and is properly referred to by her hull designation.

== Construction and commissioning ==
LST-734 was laid down on 25 January 1944, at Pittsburgh, Pennsylvania, by the Dravo Corporation, Neville Island; launched on 4 March 1944; sponsored by Mrs. W. P. Spofford; and commissioned on 22 April 1944.

== Service in United States Navy ==
=== 1940s ===
During World War II, LST-734 was assigned to the Asiatic-Pacific theater and participated in the following operations:

Capture and occupation of southern Palau Islands — September and October 1944 Leyte landings—October and November 1944 Ormoc Bay landings—December 1944 Zambales - Subic Bay — January 1945 Assault and occupation of Okinawa Gunto—April through June 1945

Following the war, LST-734 performed occupation duty in the Far East until late December 1945. She returned to the United States and was decommissioned on 7 May 1946 and struck from the Navy list on 5 June that same year. On 24 May 1948, the ship was sold to the Bethlehem Steel Co., of Bethlehem, Pennsylvania, and renamed McWilliams. She was then transferred to Argentina.

LST-734 earned four battle stars for World War II service.

== Argentine service ==
=== 1940s-1970s ===
She was sold to the Argentinian Ministry of Transport in 1948, and designated 276-B. She was transferred to the Argentine Navy, and acquired the designation BDT-14 (BDT: Buque Desembarco de Tanques). On 24 February 1959, she was renamed Cabo San Vincente. She was retired in 1966, and put on disposal in 1969. Cabo San Vincente was sold to May Zetone & Co., in 1971.

== Awards and honors ==
- American Campaign Medal
- Asiatic-Pacific Campaign Medal (4 awards)
- World War II Victory Medal
- Navy Occupation Service Medal with "Asia" clasp
- Philippines Presidential Unit Citation
- Philippines Liberation Medal (2 awards)

== Bibliography ==
- "LST-734". Dictionary of American Naval Fighting Ships. Naval History and Heritage Command.
- "USS LST-734". NavSource Online. 26 January 2018.
