= USS LST-767 =

1944 LST-542-class tank landing ship

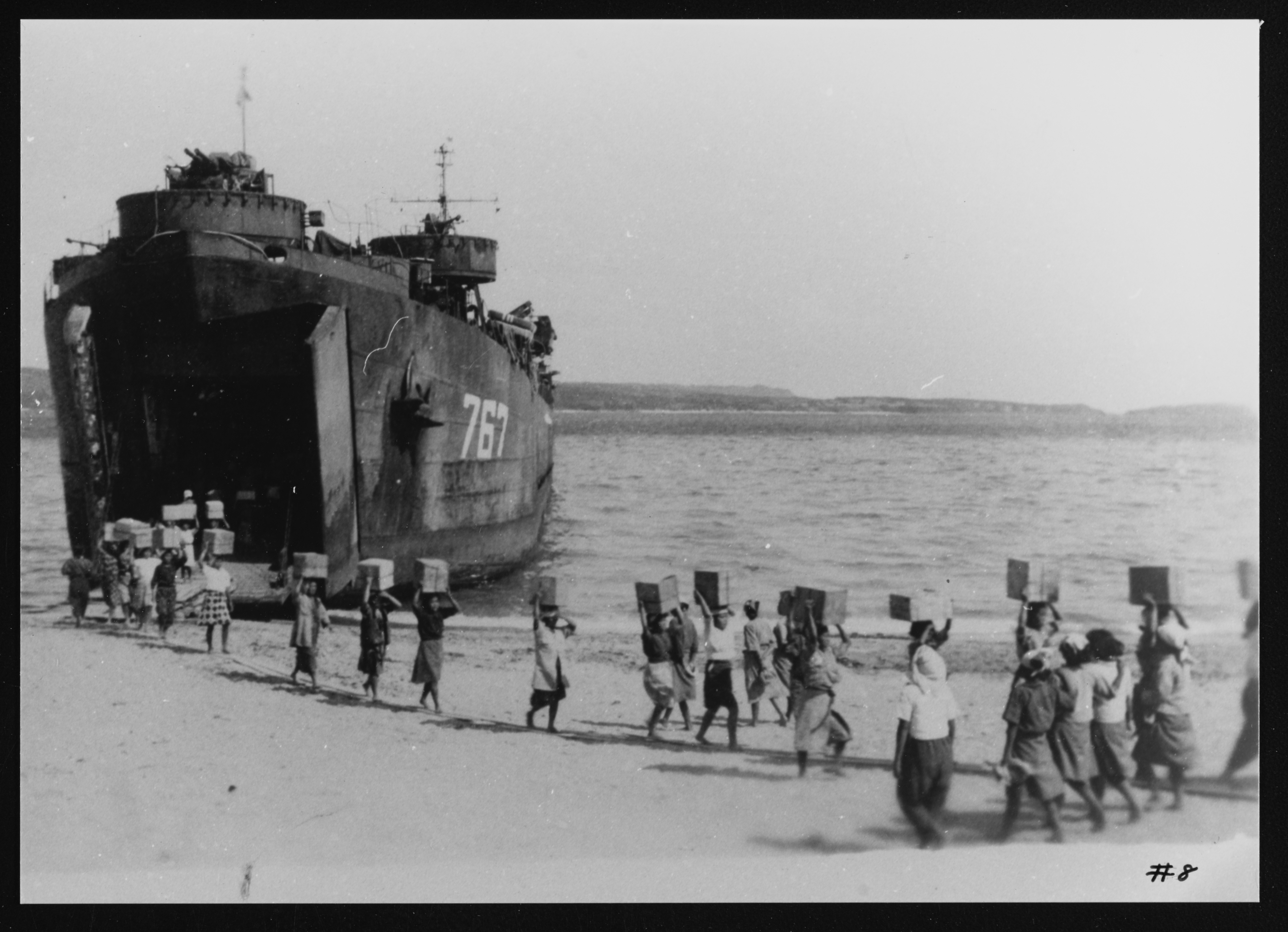

History

United States
- Name: USS LST-767
- Builder: American Bridge Company, Ambridge, Pennsylvania
- Laid down: 19 July 1944
- Launched: 4 September 1944
- Commissioned: 30 September 1944
- Decommissioned: 7 March 1946
- Stricken: 28 March 1946
- Honours and awards: 1 battle star (World War II)
- Fate: Wrecked, 1 December 1945; Sold, May 1947

General characteristics
- Class & type: LST-542-class tank landing ship
- Displacement: 1,490 long tons (1,514 t) light; 4,080 long tons (4,145 t) full
- Length: 328 ft (100 m)
- Beam: 50 ft (15 m)
- Draft: 8 ft (2.4 m) forward; 14 ft 4 in (4.37 m) aft
- Propulsion: 2 × General Motors 12-567 diesel engines, two shafts
- Speed: 10.8 knots (20.0 km/h; 12.4 mph)
- Complement: 7 officers, 104 enlisted men
- Armament: 6 × 40 mm guns; 6 × 20 mm guns

USS LST-767 was an LST-542-class tank landing ship in the United States Navy. Like many of her class, she was not named and is properly referred to by her hull designation.

LST-767 was laid down on 19 July 1944 at Ambridge, Pa., by the American Bridge Co.; launched on 4 September 1944; sponsored by Mrs. Helen Stanhope; and commissioned on 30 September 1944.

== Service history ==
She was commissioned after voyaging down the Ohio and Mississippi Rivers to New Orleans, Louisiana, and passed through the Panama Canal to the Pacific Ocean in mid-November. She then went to Pearl Harbor, Hawaii, where in mid-December 1944 she took on board military passengers, the tank landing craft LCT-749, pontoon causeway sections and other materiel. Late in the year LST-767 left Hawaii for Leyte, in the Philippine Islands, where she arrived at the beginning of February 1945. During the next two months the landing ship travelled south to New Guinea and the Solomon Islands, then returned north to Ulithi, Caroline Islands, and finally, in early April, to Okinawa, arriving a few days after U.S. forces commenced a long and bloody campaign against the island's Japanese defenders.

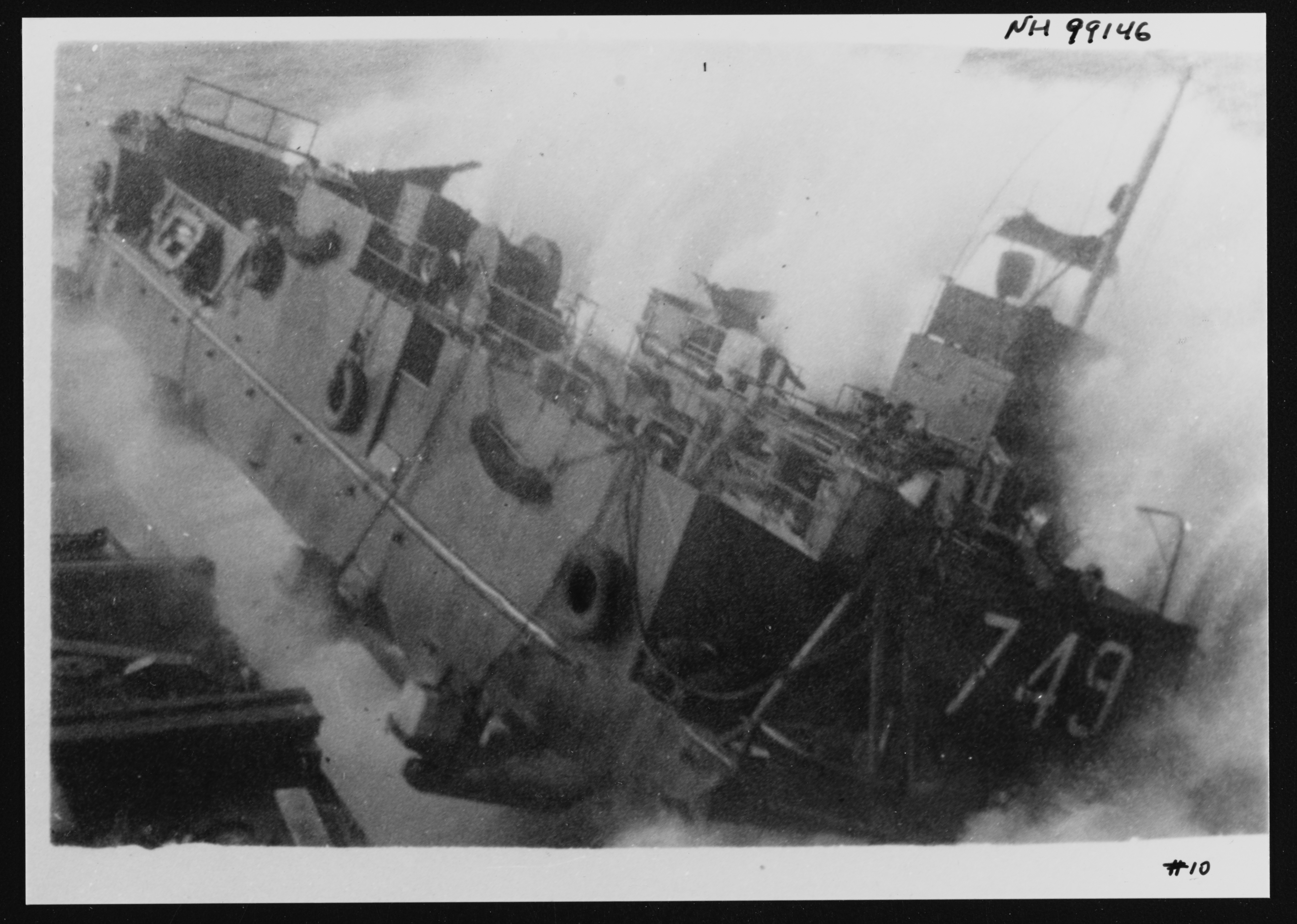
USS LCT-749 launched from on board USS LST-767, off Okinawa on 3 April 1945. The LCT had been put aboard the LST at Pearl Harbor on 10 December 1944.

After launching LCT-749 and disembarking her passengers and their equipment, LST-767 left Okinawa and began several months of transportation service in the central, south and western Pacific. She was in the Solomon Islands when Japan's mid-August 1945 agreement agreed to surrender brought the great Pacific War to an end. During the last part of September LST-767 landed cargo on Okinawa, an undertaking that was interrupted by the need to put to sea to ride out an approaching typhoon. In the early morning darkness of 1 December 1945, while beached at Kana Wan, Okinawa, LST-767 was wrecked by another storm. When it was determined that salvage would be impossible for several months, she was ordered to be stripped and disposed of. LST-767 was placed out of commission in early March 1946 and stricken from the Navy list later in that month. Her hulk was later sold, with final disposition taking place in May 1947.

LST-767 earned one battle star for World War II service.
