= USS LST-566 =

1944 LST-542-class tank landing ship

Coordinates: 11.053662°N 114.279514°E

History

United States
- Name: USS LST-566
- Builder: Missouri Valley Bridge and Iron Company, Evansville, Indiana
- Laid down: 17 March 1944
- Launched: 11 May 1944
- Sponsored by: Mrs. George C. Martin
- Commissioned: 29 May 1944
- Decommissioned: 15 March 1946
- In service: with Military Sea Transportation Service and Military Sealift Command as USNS LST-566 (T-LST-566) 1952-1973
- Fate: Transferred to Philippines, 13 September 1976
- Stricken: 1 November 1973

Philippines
- Name: BPR Lanao Del Norte (LT-504)
- Acquired: 1976
- Decommissioned: December 2004
- Out of service: December 2004
- Fate: Abandoned near Pag-Asa Island, Kalayaan Islands

General characteristics
- Class & type: LST-542-class LST
- Displacement: 1,490 tons (light); 4,080 tons (full load of 2,100 tons)
- Length: 328 ft (100 m)
- Beam: 50 ft (15 m)
- Draft: 8 ft (2.4 m) forward; 14 ft 4 in (4.37 m) aft (full load)
- Propulsion: Two diesel engines, two shafts
- Speed: 10.8 knots (20 km/h) (max); 9 knots (17 km/h) (econ)
- Complement: 7 officers, 204 enlisted
- Armament: 8 × 40 mm guns; 12 × 20 mm guns

USS LST-566 was a United States Navy LST-542-class tank landing ship in commission from 1944 to 1946. From 1952 to 1973, she served in a non-commissioned status in the Military Sea Transportation Service and the Military Sealift Command as USNS LST-566 (T-LST-566).

== Construction and commissioning ==
LST-566 was laid down on 17 March 1944 at Evansville, Indiana, by the Missouri Valley Bridge and Iron Company. launched on 11 May 1944; sponsored by Mrs. George C. Martin; and commissioned on 29 May 1944.

== Service history ==
LST-566 saw no combat action in World War II. Following World War II, LST-566 performed occupation duty in the Far East and saw service in China until early March 1946. She was decommissioned on 11 March 1946.

On 31 March 1952, LST-566 was transferred to the Military Sea Transportation Service—from 1970 the Military Sealift Command—which placed her in non-commissioned service as USNS LST-566 (T-LST-566) until she was stricken from the Navy List on 1 November 1973.

== Transfer to the Philippines ==
USNS LST-566 was transferred to the Philippine Navy on 13 September 1976 and renamed BPR Lanao Del Norte (LT-504). During December 2004, LT-504 ran aground on the coral reef very near Pag-Asa Island which is part of the Kalayaan Islands chain, during a personnel and resupply mission. Her hulk has been abandoned and aground in 2007. Later in 2017, she was dismantled at her current location for salvaging, only the submerged lower half on the hull remains. On 9 June 2020, a new sheltered port for Pag-Asa Island was completed right beside where her remaining hull rests.
