= USS LST-874 =

1944 LST-542-class tank landing ship

History

United States
- Name: LST-874
- Builder: Missouri Valley Bridge & Iron Co., Evansville
- Laid down: 16 October 1944
- Launched: 25 November 1944
- Commissioned: 18 December 1944
- Decommissioned: 29 May 1946
- Stricken: 3 July 1946
- Honours and awards: 1 battle star (World War II)
- Fate: Sold, 8 June 1948

History

France
- Name: Chélif
- Namesake: Chélif
- Commissioned: 8 June 1948
- Identification: Pennant number: L9006

General characteristics
- Class & type: LST-542-class tank landing ship
- Displacement: 1,490 long tons (1,514 t) light; 4,080 long tons (4,145 t) full
- Length: 328 ft (100 m)
- Beam: 50 ft (15 m)
- Draft: 8 ft (2.4 m) forward; 14 ft 4 in (4.37 m) aft
- Propulsion: 2 × General Motors 12-567 diesel engines, two shafts
- Speed: 10.8 knots (20.0 km/h; 12.4 mph)
- Complement: 7 officers, 104 enlisted men
- Armament: 6 × 40 mm guns; 6 × 20 mm guns

USS LST-874 was an LST-542-class tank landing ship in the United States Navy. Like many of her class, she was not named and is properly referred to by her hull designation.

LST-874 was laid down on 16 October 1944 at Evansville, Indiana, by the Missouri Valley Bridge & Iron Co.; launched on 25 November 1944; sponsored by Mrs. Ernest B. Rainey; and commissioned on 18 December 1944.

== USN service history ==
During World War II, LST-874 was assigned to the Asiatic-Pacific theater and participated in the assault and occupation of Okinawa Gunto from April through June 1945. Following the war, she performed occupation duty in the Far East until early January 1946. LST-874 returned to the United States and was decommissioned on 29 May 1946 and struck from the Navy list on 3 July that same year.

LST-874 earned one battle star for World War II service.

== French service history ==
On 8 June 1948, the ship was sold to Donald P. Loker, then transferred to France. where it was commissioned the RFS Chélif (L9006) where it served in the First Indochina War and the Algerian War
