= USS LST-828 =

LST-542-class tank landing ship

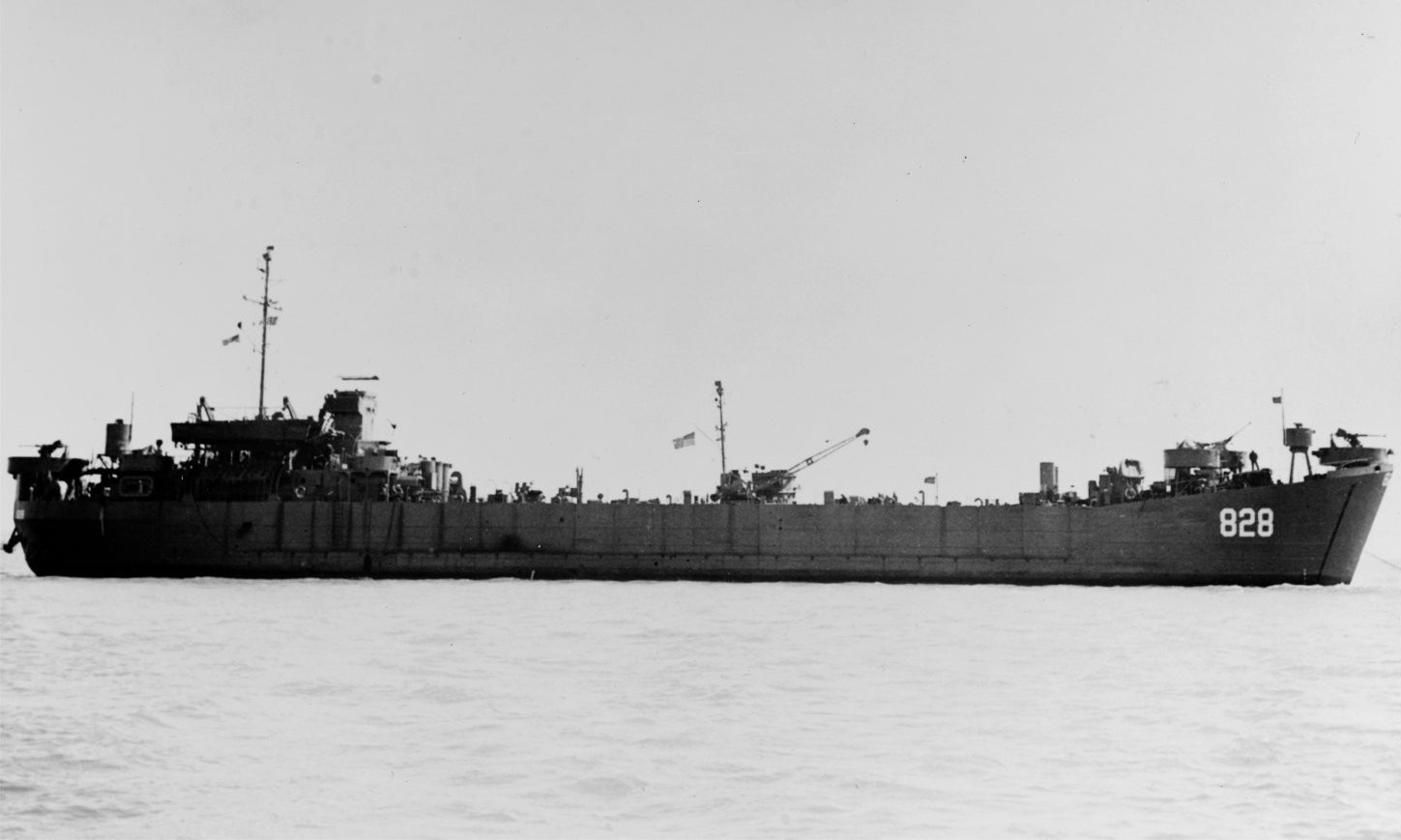

History

United States
- Name: USS LST-828
- Builder: Missouri Valley Bridge & Iron Co., Evansville, Indiana
- Laid down: 13 October 1944
- Launched: 22 November 1944
- Commissioned: 13 December 1944
- Decommissioned: 22 April 1947
- Stricken: 22 May 1947
- Honours and awards: 1 battle star (World War II)
- Fate: Destroyed, 7 May 1947

General characteristics
- Class & type: LST-542-class tank landing ship
- Displacement: 1,490 long tons (1,514 t) light; 4,080 long tons (4,145 t) full
- Length: 328 ft (100 m)
- Beam: 50 ft (15 m)
- Draft: 8 ft (2.4 m) forward; 14 ft 4 in (4.37 m) aft
- Propulsion: 2 × General Motors 12-567 diesel engines, two shafts
- Speed: 10.8 knots (20.0 km/h; 12.4 mph)
- Complement: 7 officers, 104 enlisted men
- Armament: 6 × 40 mm guns; 6 × 20 mm guns

USS LST-828 was an LST-542-class tank landing ship in the United States Navy. Like many of her class, she was not named and is properly referred to by her hull designation.

LST-828 was laid down on 13 October 1944 at Evansville, Indiana, by the Missouri Valley Bridge & Iron Co.; launched on 22 November 1944; sponsored by Mrs. David M. Hammond; and commissioned on 13 December 1944.

== Service history ==
During World War II, LST-828 was assigned to the Asiatic-Pacific theater and participated in the assault and occupation of Okinawa Gunto from April through June 1945. Following the war, the ship performed occupation duty in the Far East until early January 1946. LST-828 was decommissioned on 22 April 1947. Usable equipment was removed, and the residual hulk was destroyed on 7 May 1947 in the Marianas. She was struck from the Navy list on 22 May 1947.

LST-828 earned one battle star for World War II service.
