= USS LST-994 =

LST-542-class ship of the U.S. Navy

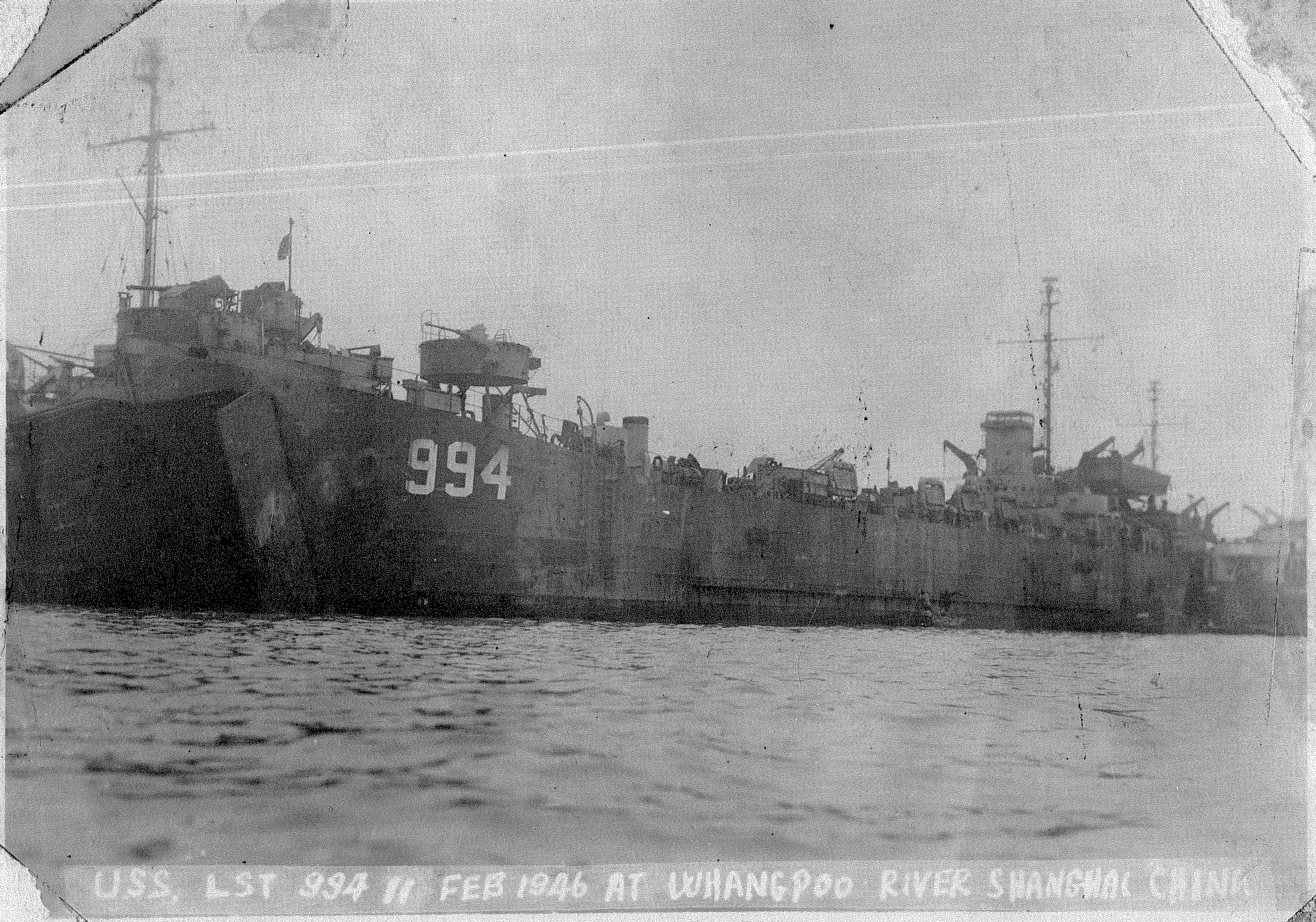
- USS LST 994 at anchor in the Huangpu River, Shanghai, China, 11 February 1946

History

United States
- Name: USS LST-994
- Laid down: 12 March 1944
- Launched: 17 April 1944
- Commissioned: 17 May 1944
- Decommissioned: 7 March 1947
- Fate: Sold, 15 June 1948

Argentina
- Name: Doña Flora, ARA Cabo San Pablo (BDT-7)
- Acquired: 23 December 1947
- Out of service: 1966
- Stricken: 4 April 1947
- Honours and awards: one battle star

General characteristics
- Class & type: LST-542-class LST
- Displacement: 1,490 tons (light); 4,080 tons (full load of 2,100 tons)
- Length: 328 ft (100 m)
- Beam: 50 ft (15 m)
- Draft: 8 ft (2.4 m) forward; 14 ft 4 in (4.37 m) aft (full load)
- Propulsion: Two diesel engines, two shafts
- Speed: 10.8 knots (20 km/h) (max); 9 knots (17 km/h) (econ)
- Complement: 7 officers, 204 enlisted
- Armament: 8 × 40 mm guns; 12 × 20 mm guns

USS LST-994 was an LST-542-class tank landing ship in the United States Navy. Like many of her class, she was not named and is properly referred to by her hull designation.

== History ==
LST-994 was laid down on 12 March 1944 at the Boston Navy Yard; launched on 17 April 1944; sponsored by Mrs. Lillian A. Finnerty; and commissioned on 17 May 1944.

During World War II, LST-994 was assigned to the European theater and participated in the invasion of southern France in August and September 1944. Following the war, she performed occupation duty in the Far East and saw service in China until mid-April 1946. She returned to the United States and was decommissioned on 31 July 1946 and struck from the Navy list on 28 August that same year. On 23 December 1947, the ship was sold to Pablo N. Ferrari & Co. and operated as Doña Flora in Argentina

=== Argentine service ===
In Argentine Navy service, Doña Flora was redesignated BDT-7 (Buque Desembarco de Tanques), and was named ARA Cabo San Pablo. She was retired in 1966.

LST-994 earned one battle star for World War II service.
