= USS LST-851 =

World War II tank landing ship

History

United States
- Name: USS LST-851
- Laid down: 10 August 1944
- Launched: 8 November 1944
- Commissioned: 30 November 1944
- Decommissioned: 24 April 1946
- Fate: Sold, 30 September 1946
- Stricken: 8 May 1946
- Honours and awards: one battle star

Argentina
- Name: ARA BDT-1/Q41
- Acquired: 14 November 1948
- Out of service: 1968
- Identification: IMO number: 5402021

General characteristics
- Class & type: LST-542-class LST
- Displacement: 1,490 tons (light); 4,080 tons (full load of 2,100 tons)
- Length: 328 ft (100 m)
- Beam: 50 ft (15 m)
- Draft: 8 ft (2.4 m) forward; 14 ft 4 in (4.37 m) aft (full load)
- Propulsion: Two diesel engines, two shafts
- Speed: 10.8 knots (20 km/h) (max); 9 knots (17 km/h) (econ)
- Complement: 7 officers, 204 enlisted
- Armament: 8 × 40 mm guns; 12 × 20 mm guns

USS LST-851 was an LST-542-class tank landing ship in the United States Navy. Like many of her class, she was not named and is properly referred to by her hull designation.

== History ==
LST-851 was laid down on 10 August 1944 at Seneca, Illinois, by the Chicago Bridge & Iron Co.; launched on 8 November 1944; sponsored by Mrs. Gertrude B. Van Trigt; and commissioned on 30 November 1944.

During World War II, LST-851 was assigned to the Asiatic-Pacific theater and participated in the assault and occupation of Okinawa Gunto in May 1945. Following the war, the ship performed occupation duty in the Far East until mid-October 1945. She returned to the United States and was decommissioned on 24 April 1946 and struck from the Navy list on 8 May that same year. On 30 September 1946, LST-851 was sold to the Northwest Merchandising Service, Seattle, Wash.

LST-851 earned one battle star for World War II service.

=== Argentine service ===
The final disposition is uncertain, but it is likely that LST-851 went to Argentina, where she was redesignated ARA BDT-1 (Buque Desembarco de Tanques), and later redesignated Q41.

Some confusion exists concerning whether BDT-1 was LST-851 or LST-875; however, sources indicate that LST-875 went to the Philippines.
