= USS LST-986 =

1944 LST-542-class tank landing ship

History

United States
- Name: USS LST-986
- Builder: Boston Navy Yard
- Laid down: 15 January 1944
- Launched: 5 March 1944
- Commissioned: 14 April 1944
- Decommissioned: 18 July 1946
- Stricken: 28 August 1946
- Honours and awards: 3 battle stars (World War II)
- Fate: Sold for scrapping, 4 November 1948

General characteristics
- Class & type: LST-542-class tank landing ship
- Displacement: 1,490 long tons (1,514 t) light; 4,080 long tons (4,145 t) full
- Length: 328 ft (100 m)
- Beam: 50 ft (15 m)
- Draft: 8 ft (2.4 m) forward; 14 ft 4 in (4.37 m) aft
- Propulsion: 2 × General Motors 12-567 diesel engines, two shafts
- Speed: 10.8 knots (20.0 km/h; 12.4 mph)
- Complement: 7 officers, 104 enlisted men
- Armament: 6 × 40 mm guns; 6 × 20 mm guns

USS LST-986 was an LST-542-class tank landing ship in the United States Navy. Like many of her class, she was not named and is properly referred to by her hull designation.

LST-986 was laid down on 15 January 1944 at the Boston Navy Yard; launched on 5 March 1944; and commissioned on 14 April 1944.

== Service history ==
During World War II, LST-986 was assigned to the Asiatic-Pacific theater and participated in the following operations; capture and occupation of Guam (July and August 1944), Lingayen Gulf landings (January 1945), assault and occupation of Okinawa Gunto (April and May 1945).

Following the war, LST-986 performed occupation duty in the Far East until early March 1946. She returned to the United States and was decommissioned on 18 July 1946 and struck from the Navy List on 28 August that same year. On 4 November 1948, the ship was sold to the Moore Dry Dock Company, Oakland, California, for scrapping.

LST-986 earned three battle stars for World War II service.
