= USS LST-1044 =

Tank landing ship

History

United States
- Name: USS LST-1044
- Laid down: 25 November 1944
- Launched: 3 February 1944
- Commissioned: 2 March 1945
- Decommissioned: 26 June 1946
- Fate: Sold, 8 January 1948
- Stricken: 31 July 1946
- Honours and awards: one battle star

Argentina
- Name: ARA Cabo Pio (BDT-10)
- Acquired: 14 November 1948
- Out of service: 1981

General characteristics
- Class & type: LST-542-class LST
- Displacement: 1,490 tons (light); 4,080 tons (full load of 2,100 tons)
- Length: 328 ft (100 m)
- Beam: 50 ft (15 m)
- Draft: 8 ft (2.4 m) forward; 14 ft 4 in (4.37 m) aft (full load)
- Propulsion: Two diesel engines, two shafts
- Speed: 10.8 knots (20 km/h) (max); 9 knots (17 km/h) (econ)
- Complement: 7 officers, 204 enlisted
- Armament: 8 × 40 mm guns; 12 × 20 mm guns

USS LST-1044 was an LST-542-class tank landing ship in the United States Navy. Like many of her class, she was not named and is properly referred to by her hull designation.

== History ==
LST-1044 was laid down on 25 November 1944 at Pittsburgh, Pa., by the Dravo Corporation; launched on 3 February 1945; sponsored by Mrs. J. D. Port; and commissioned on 2 March 1945.

Following World War II, LST-1044 performed occupation duty in the Far East and saw service in China until mid-April 1946. She returned to the United States and was decommissioned on 28 June 1946 and struck from the Navy list on 31 July that same year. In January 1948, the ship was sold to Pablo N. Ferrari & Co. for operation, and was transferred to Argentina.

=== Argentine service ===
In Argentine Navy service, LST-1044 was renamed ARA Cabo Pio and redesignated BDT-10 (Buque Desembarco de Tanques), later Q-50. She was retired in 1981.
