= USS LST-896 =

WWII US naval vessel

History

United States
- Name: USS LST-896
- Builder: Dravo Corporation, Pittsburgh, Pennsylvania
- Laid down: 6 October 1944
- Launched: 18 November 1944
- Commissioned: 20 December 1944
- Decommissioned: 3 December 1945
- Stricken: 3 January 1946
- Fate: Destroyed, 8 March 1946

General characteristics
- Class & type: LST-542-class tank landing ship
- Displacement: 1,490 long tons (1,514 t) light; 4,080 long tons (4,145 t) full
- Length: 328 ft (100 m)
- Beam: 50 ft (15 m)
- Draft: 8 ft (2.4 m) forward; 14 ft 4 in (4.37 m) aft
- Propulsion: 2 × General Motors 12-567 diesel engines, two shafts
- Speed: 10.8 knots (20.0 km/h; 12.4 mph)
- Complement: 7 officers, 104 enlisted men
- Armament: 6 × 40 mm guns; 6 × 20 mm guns

USS LST-896 was an LST-542-class tank landing ship in the United States Navy. Like many of her class, she was not named and is properly referred to by her hull designation.

LST-896 was laid down on 6 October 1944 at Pittsburgh, Pennsylvania, by the Dravo Corporation; launched on 18 November 1944; sponsored by Mrs. Russell D. Strouse; and commissioned on 20 December 1944.

== Service history ==
Following World War II, LST-896 performed occupation duty in the Far East and saw service in China until early December 1945. She was decommissioned on 3 December 1945 and struck from the Navy list on 3 January 1946. Her typhoon-damaged hulk was destroyed on 8 March 1946.
