= USS LST-814 =

1944 LST-542-class tank landing ship

History

United States
- Name: USS LST-814
- Builder: Missouri Valley Bridge & Iron Co., Evansville, Indiana
- Laid down: 25 August 1944
- Launched: 4 October 1944
- Commissioned: 27 October 1944
- Decommissioned: 16 April 1946
- Stricken: 8 May 1946
- Honours and awards: 1 battle star (World War II)
- Fate: Sunk, 12 August 1946

General characteristics
- Class & type: LST-542-class tank landing ship
- Displacement: 1,490 long tons (1,514 t) light; 4,080 long tons (4,145 t) full
- Length: 328 ft (100 m)
- Beam: 50 ft (15 m)
- Draft: 8 ft (2.4 m) forward; 14 ft 4 in (4.37 m) aft
- Propulsion: 2 × General Motors 12-567 diesel engines, two shafts
- Speed: 10.8 knots (20.0 km/h; 12.4 mph)
- Complement: 7 officers, 104 enlisted men
- Armament: 6 × 40 mm guns; 6 × 20 mm guns

USS LST-814 was an LST-542-class tank landing ship in the United States Navy. Like many of her class, she was not named and is properly referred to by her hull designation.

LST-814 was laid down on 25 August 1944 at Evansville, Indiana, by the Missouri Valley Bridge & Iron Co.; launched on 4 October 1944; sponsored by Mrs. William B. Fletcher; and commissioned on 27 October 1944.

== Service history ==
During World War II, LST-814 was assigned to the Asiatic-Pacific theater and participated in the assault and occupation of Okinawa Gunto from March through May 1945. Following the end of the war, in September 1945, LST-814 performed occupation duty in the Far East until mid-April 1946. During this period, she was severely damaged during a beaching operation off Sasebo, Japan, on 30 December 1945. The tank landing ship was decommissioned on 16 April 1946 and struck from the Navy list on 8 May that same year. LST-814 was later sunk on 12 August 1946.

LST-814 earned one battle star for World War II service.
