= USS LST-345 =

1942 LST-1-class tank landing ship

History

United States
- Name: USS LST-345
- Builder: Norfolk Navy Yard
- Laid down: 17 October 1942
- Launched: 15 December 1942
- Commissioned: 21 January 1943
- Decommissioned: 5 December 1945
- Stricken: 3 January 1946
- Honours and awards: 3 battle stars (WWII)
- Fate: Sold for scrapping, 23 March 1948

General characteristics
- Class & type: LST-1-class tank landing ship
- Displacement: 1,780 long tons (1,809 t) light; 3,880 long tons (3,942 t) full
- Length: 328 ft (100 m)
- Beam: 50 ft (15 m)
- Draft: Unloaded: Bow: 2 ft 4 in (0.71 m); Stern: 7 ft 6 in (2.29 m); Loaded : Bow: 8 ft 2 in (2.49 m); Stern: 14 ft 1 in (4.29 m)
- Propulsion: 2 × General Motors 12-567 diesel engines, two shafts, twin rudders
- Speed: 12 knots (22 km/h; 14 mph)
- Boats & landing craft carried: 2-6 × LCVPs
- Troops: approx. 140 officers and enlisted
- Complement: 8–10 officers, 100–115 enlisted men
- Armament: 1 × single 3-inch/50-caliber gun mount; 5 × 40 mm gun mounts; 6 × 20 mm gun mounts; 2 × .50 cal (12.7 mm) machine guns; 4 × .30 cal (7.62 mm) machine guns

USS LST-345 was a LST-1-class tank landing ship of the United States Navy during World War II.

== History ==
LST-345 was laid down on 17 October 1942 at the Norfolk Navy Yard; launched on 15 December 1942; sponsored by Mrs. John B. Brown; and commissioned on 21 January 1943.

LST-345 departed US shores for northern Africa on 1 May 1943.

During World War II, LST-345 was assigned to the European theater and participated in the following operations:

- Sicilian occupation – July 1943
- Salerno landings – September 1943
- Invasion of Normandy – June 1944

While operating out of Bizerte, Tunisia, LST-345 was exposed to German air raids every night for three months. Sailing to Britain from the Mediterranean, LST-345 encountered a Nazi Wolf pack in the Atlantic. LST-345 made 56 cross-channel voyages between Britain and France in support of the Allied offensive in Europe.

Decommissioned on 5 December 1945 and struck from the Naval Register on 3 January 1946, she was sold on 23 March 1948 to the Ships & Power Equipment Co. of Barber, New Jersey for scrap.

LST-345 earned three battle stars for World War II service.
