= USS LST-27 =

1943 LST-1-class tank landing ship

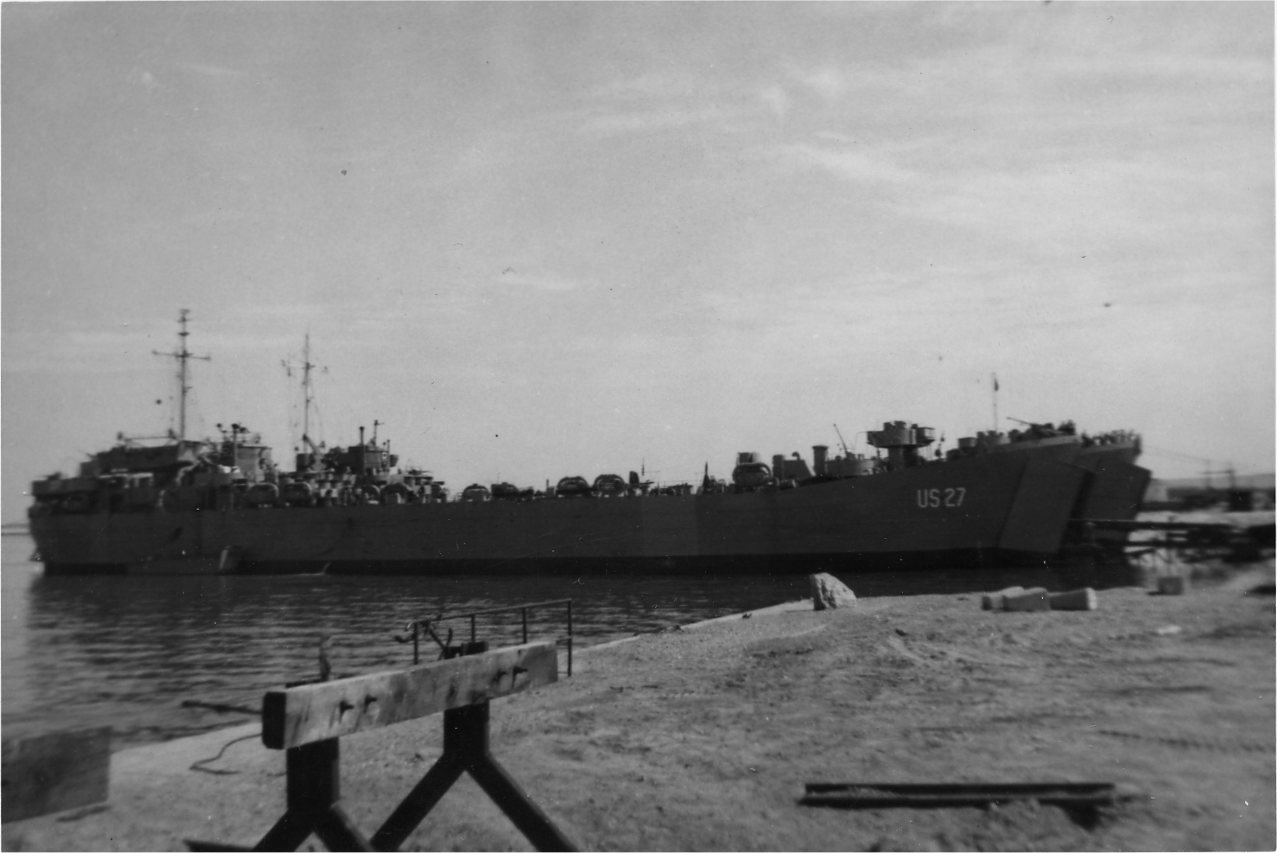
- USS LST-27 beached alongside an unidentified LST in England in early June 1944, while loading out for the invasion of France.

History

United States
- Name: LST-27
- Builder: Dravo Corporation, Pittsburgh, Pennsylvania
- Laid down: 10 December 1942
- Launched: 27 April 1943
- Sponsored by: Mrs. R. R. Creed
- Commissioned: 16 June 1943
- Decommissioned: 9 November 1945
- Stricken: 28 November 1945
- Identification: Hull symbol: LST-27; Code letters: NDSC
- Honors and awards: 2 × battle stars
- Fate: Sold for scrapping, 15 December 1947

General characteristics
- Type: LST-1-class tank landing ship
- Displacement: 4,080 long tons (4,145 t) full load; 2,160 long tons (2,190 t) landing
- Length: 328 ft (100 m) oa
- Beam: 50 ft (15 m)
- Draft: Full load: 8 ft 2 in (2.49 m) forward; 14 ft 1 in (4.29 m) aft; Landing at 2,160 t: 3 ft 11 in (1.19 m) forward; 9 ft 10 in (3.00 m) aft
- Installed power: 2 × 900 hp (670 kW) Electro-Motive Diesel 12-567A diesel engines; 1,700 shp (1,300 kW)
- Propulsion: 1 × Falk main reduction gears; 2 × Propellers
- Speed: 12 kn (22 km/h; 14 mph)
- Range: 24,000 nmi (44,000 km; 28,000 mi) at 9 kn (17 km/h; 10 mph) while displacing 3,960 long tons (4,024 t)
- Boats & landing craft carried: 2 or 6 x LCVPs
- Capacity: 2,100 tons oceangoing maximum; 350 tons main deckload
- Troops: 16 officers, 147 enlisted men
- Complement: 13 officers, 104 enlisted men
- Armament: Varied, ultimate armament; 2 × twin 40 mm (1.57 in) Bofors guns; 4 × single 40 mm Bofors guns; 12 × 20 mm (0.79 in) Oerlikon cannons

Service record
- Part of: LST Flotilla 11
- Operations: Normandy landings (6–25 June 1944)
- Awards: American Campaign Medal; European–African–Middle Eastern Campaign Medal; World War II Victory Medal

USS LST-27 was a United States Navy LST-1-class tank landing ship used exclusively in the Europe-Africa-Middle East Theater during World War II and crewed by the United States Coast Guard. Like many of her class, she was not named and is properly referred to by her hull designation.

== Construction ==
LST-27 was laid down on 10 December 1942, at Pittsburgh, Pennsylvania, by the Dravo Corporation; launched on 27 April 1943; sponsored by Mrs. R. R. Creed; and commissioned on 25 June 1943.

== Service history ==
On 4 April 1944, she was in the Mediterranean reaching Tunisia, on 13 April 1944. There are records that indicate she traveled from Oran, Algeria, joining Convoy MKS 46 sometime after 9 April 1944, arriving in Gibraltar on 21 April 1944. She departed Gibraltar on 22 April 1944, with Convoy MKS 46G to rendezvous with Convoy SL 155 on April 23, 1944, arriving in Liverpool on 3 May 1944.

She participated in the invasion at Omaha Beach. LST-27 departing from Trebah near Falmouth, Cornwall, for the Normandy coast on 5 June 1944, transporting units of the 29th Infantry Division. She remained in British waters until 2 July 1944, when she departed for Norfolk, Virginia, arriving there on 17 July 1944.

== Postwar career ==
LST-27 was decommissioned on 9 November 1945, at Boston, and was struck from the Navy list on 28 November 1945. On 15 December 1947, she was sold to the Rhode Island Navigation Co., of Newport, Rhode Island, for scrapping.

== Awards ==
LST-27 earned two battle stars for her World War II service.

== Bibliography ==
- "LST-27". Dictionary of American Naval Fighting Ships. Naval History and Heritage Command. 30 July 2015. This article incorporates text from this source, which is in the public domain.
- "USS LST-27". NavSource. 10 March 2017.
- "Convoy MKS.46". Arnold Hague Convoy Database.
- "Convoy MKS.46G". Arnold Hague Convoy Database.
- "Convoy SL.155/MKS.46". Arnold Hague Convoy Database.
- "USS LST-27" (PDF). United States Coast Guard. This article incorporates text from this source, which is in the public domain.
