= USS LST-11 =

American tank landing ship

History

United States
- Name: LST-11
- Builder: Dravo Corporation, Pittsburgh, Pennsylvania
- Laid down: 8 August 1942
- Launched: 18 November 1942
- Sponsored by: Miss Virginia Fowler
- Fate: Transferred to the Royal Navy, 22 March 1943

United Kingdom
- Name: LST-11
- Acquired: 22 March 1943
- Commissioned: 23 March 1943
- Decommissioned: 13 May 1946
- Fate: Returned to US Naval custody, 13 May 1946

United States
- Acquired: 13 May 1946
- Stricken: 5 June 1946
- Fate: Sold, 5 December 1947

General characteristics
- Type: LST-1-class tank landing ship
- Displacement: 4,080 long tons (4,145 t) full load; 2,160 long tons (2,190 t) landing
- Length: 328 ft (100 m) oa
- Beam: 50 ft (15 m)
- Draft: Full load: 8 ft 2 in (2.49 m) forward; 14 ft 1 in (4.29 m) aft; Landing at 2,160 t: 3 ft 11 in (1.19 m) forward; 9 ft 10 in (3.00 m) aft
- Installed power: 2 × 900 hp (670 kW) Electro-Motive Diesel 12-567A diesel engines; 1,700 shp (1,300 kW)
- Propulsion: 1 × Falk main reduction gears; 2 × Propellers
- Speed: 12 kn (22 km/h; 14 mph)
- Range: 24,000 nmi (44,000 km; 28,000 mi) at 9 kn (17 km/h; 10 mph) while displacing 3,960 long tons (4,024 t)
- Boats & landing craft carried: 2 or 6 x LCVPs
- Capacity: 2,100 tons oceangoing maximum; 350 tons main deckload
- Troops: 163
- Complement: 117
- Armament: Varied, ultimate armament; 2 × twin 40 mm (1.57 in) Bofors guns; 4 × single 40 mm Bofors guns; 12 × 20 mm (0.79 in) Oerlikon cannons

Service record
- Operations: Anzio-Nettuno advanced landings; Invasion of Normandy; Invasion of Malaya

HM LST-11 was an LST-1-class tank landing ship of the United States Navy built during World War II. LST-11 was transferred to the Royal Navy in March 1943, before being commissioned into the US Navy. Like many of her class, she was not named and is properly referred to by her hull designation. She never saw service with the US Navy.

== Construction ==
LST-11 was laid down on 8 August 1942, at Pittsburgh, Pennsylvania by the Dravo Corporation; launched on 18 November 1942; sponsored by Miss Virginia Fowler; transferred to the Royal Navy on 22 March 1943, and commissioned the following day.

== Service history ==
LST-11 left from Hampton Roads, Virginia for the Mediterranean on 14 May 1943, with convoy UGS 8A, arriving in Oran, Algeria, sometime before 8 June 1943.

She participated in the Anzio Advanced Landings from January to March of 1944, in the Mediterranean Theatre. LST-11 was sent to Cardiff, Wales, for repairs in May 1944. She then participated in the Normandy landings in June 1944, in the European Theatre. She was then sent to Thames and Portsmouth for repairs in June and August 1944.

LST-11 was then assigned to the Pacific theatre and participated in what was originally planned to be Operation Zipper, the recapture of Malay, in September 1945, but with Japan surrendering this was an unopposed action.

She was paid off at Subic Bay on 13 April 1946.

== Final disposition ==
She was returned to the US Navy on 13 May 1946, and was struck from the Navy list on 5 June 1946. On 5 December 1947, she was sold to Bosey, Philippines.

== Bibliography ==
- "LST-11". Dictionary of American Naval Fighting Ships. Naval History and Heritage Command. This article incorporates text from this source, which is in the public domain.
- "LST-11". NavSource. 16 May 2014.
- "Convoy UGS.8A". Arnold Hague Convoy Database.
