= USS LST-981 =

Tank landing ship

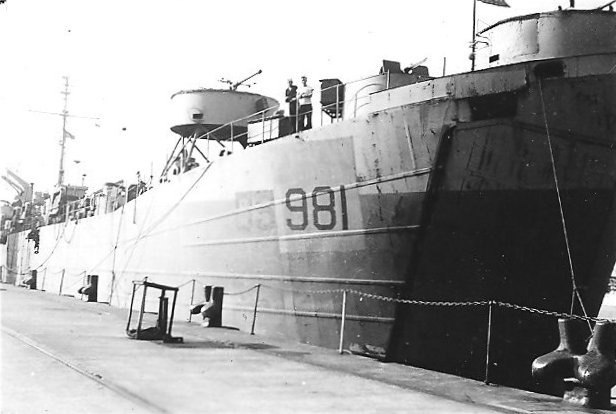
- USS LST-981

History

United States
- Name: LST-981
- Builder: Boston Navy Yard
- Laid down: 9 December 1943
- Launched: 27 January 1944
- Sponsored by: Miss Helen Madden
- Commissioned: 11 March 1944
- Decommissioned: 30 July 1946
- Stricken: 28 August 1946
- Identification: Hull symbol: LST-981; Code letters: NTLL
- Honors and awards: 2 × battle stars
- Fate: Sold for scrapping, 12 December 1947

General characteristics
- Class & type: LST-542-class tank landing ship
- Displacement: 1,625 long tons (1,651 t) (light); 4,080 long tons (4,145 t) (full (seagoing draft with 1,675 short tons (1,520 t) load); 2,366 long tons (2,404 t) (beaching)
- Length: 328 ft (100 m) oa
- Beam: 50 ft (15 m)
- Draft: Unloaded: 2 ft 4 in (0.71 m) forward; 7 ft 6 in (2.29 m) aft; Full load: 8 ft 3 in (2.51 m) forward; 14 ft 1 in (4.29 m) aft; Landing with 500 short tons (450 t) load: 3 ft 11 in (1.19 m) forward; 9 ft 10 in (3.00 m) aft; Limiting 11 ft 2 in (3.40 m); Maximum navigation 14 ft 1 in (4.29 m)
- Installed power: 2 × 900 hp (670 kW) Electro-Motive Diesel 12-567A diesel engines; 1,800 shp (1,300 kW)
- Propulsion: 1 × Falk main reduction gears; 2 × Propellers
- Speed: 11.6 kn (21.5 km/h; 13.3 mph)
- Range: 24,000 nmi (44,000 km; 28,000 mi) at 9 kn (17 km/h; 10 mph) while displacing 3,960 long tons (4,024 t)
- Boats & landing craft carried: 2 x LCVPs
- Capacity: 1,600–1,900 short tons (3,200,000–3,800,000 lb; 1,500,000–1,700,000 kg) cargo depending on mission
- Troops: 16 officers, 147 enlisted men
- Complement: 13 officers, 104 enlisted men
- Armament: Varied, ultimate armament; 2 × twin 40 mm (1.57 in) Bofors guns; 4 × single 40 mm Bofors guns; 12 × 20 mm (0.79 in) Oerlikon cannons

Service record
- Part of: LST Flotilla 35 (Pacific service)
- Operations: Invasion of Normandy (6–25 June 1944); Assault and occupation of Okinawa Gunto (29 May–10 June 1945)
- Awards: American Campaign Medal; European-African-Middle Eastern Campaign Medal; Asiatic–Pacific Campaign Medal; World War II Victory Medal; Navy Occupation Service Medal w/Asia Clasp

USS LST-981 was an LST-542-class tank landing ship in the United States Navy. Like many of her class, she was not named and is properly referred to by her hull designation.

== Construction ==
LST-981 was laid down on 9 December 1943, at the Boston Navy Yard; launched on 27 January 1944; sponsored by Miss Helen Madden; and commissioned on 11 March 1944.

== Service history ==
During World War II, LST-981 was assigned to the European Theater and participated in the invasion of Normandy in June 1944. Transferred to the Asiatic-Pacific Theater, she engaged in the assault and occupation of Okinawa Gunto in May and June 1945.

Following the war, she performed occupation duty in the Far East until mid-May 1946. She returned to the United States and was decommissioned on 30 July 1946, and struck from the Navy list on 28 August, that same year. On 12 December 1947, the ship was sold to the Salco Iron & Metal Co. for scrapping.

== Awards ==
LST-981 earned two battle stars for World War II service.

== Bibliography ==
Online resources

- "LST-981". Dictionary of American Naval Fighting Ships. Naval History and Heritage Command. This article incorporates text from this source, which is in the public domain.
- "USS LST-981". NavSource. 13 May 2016.
