= USS LST-1000 =

1944 LST-542-class tank landing ship

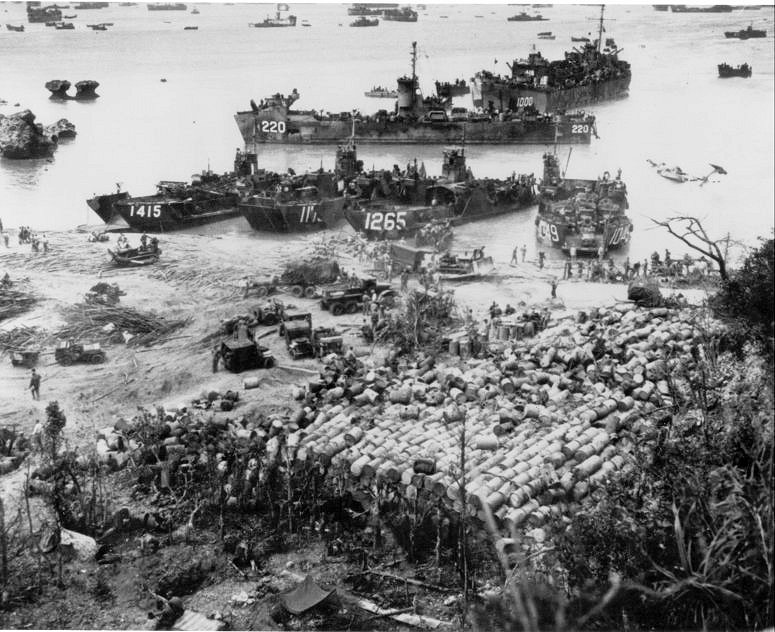
- INSERT ALTTEXT HERE

History

United States
- Name: USS LST-1000
- Laid down: 18 April 1944
- Launched: 26 May 1944
- Commissioned: 14 June 1944
- Decommissioned: 22 July 1946
- Fate: Sold, 13 June 1948
- Stricken: 28 August 1946
- Honours and awards: one battle star

General characteristics
- Class & type: LST-542-class LST
- Displacement: 1,490 tons (light); 4,080 tons (full load of 2,100 tons)
- Length: 328 ft (100 m)
- Beam: 50 ft (15 m)
- Draft: 8 ft (2.4 m) forward; 14 ft 4 in (4.37 m) aft (full load)
- Propulsion: Two diesel engines, two shafts
- Speed: 10.8 kn (20.0 km/h; 12.4 mph) (max); 9 kn (17 km/h; 10 mph) (econ)
- Complement: 7 officers, 204 enlisted
- Armament: 8 × 40 mm guns; 12 × 20 mm guns

USS LST-1000 was an LST-542-class tank landing ship in the United States Navy. Like many of her class, she was not named and is properly referred to by her hull designation.

LST-1000 was laid down on 26 February 1944 at the Boston Navy Yard; launched on 27 March 1944; and commissioned on 14 June 1944.

During World War II LST-1000 was first assigned to the European Theater: LST-1000 departed New York City to Avonmouth, UK, 25 July 1944 as part of convoy HXM 30, to resupply troops in Normandy and Mont Saint-Michel. LST-1000 returned to the US and arrived at Norfolk, Virginia 23 October 1944 LST-1000 departed New York City, 29 November 1944 en route to the Asiatic-Pacific Theater where she participated in the assault and occupation of Okinawa Gunto in April 1945

Following World War II LST-1000 performed occupation duty in the Far East and saw service in China until mid-April 1946.

LST-1000 earned one battle star for World War II service.
