= USS LST-984 =

Tank landing ship in the United States Navy

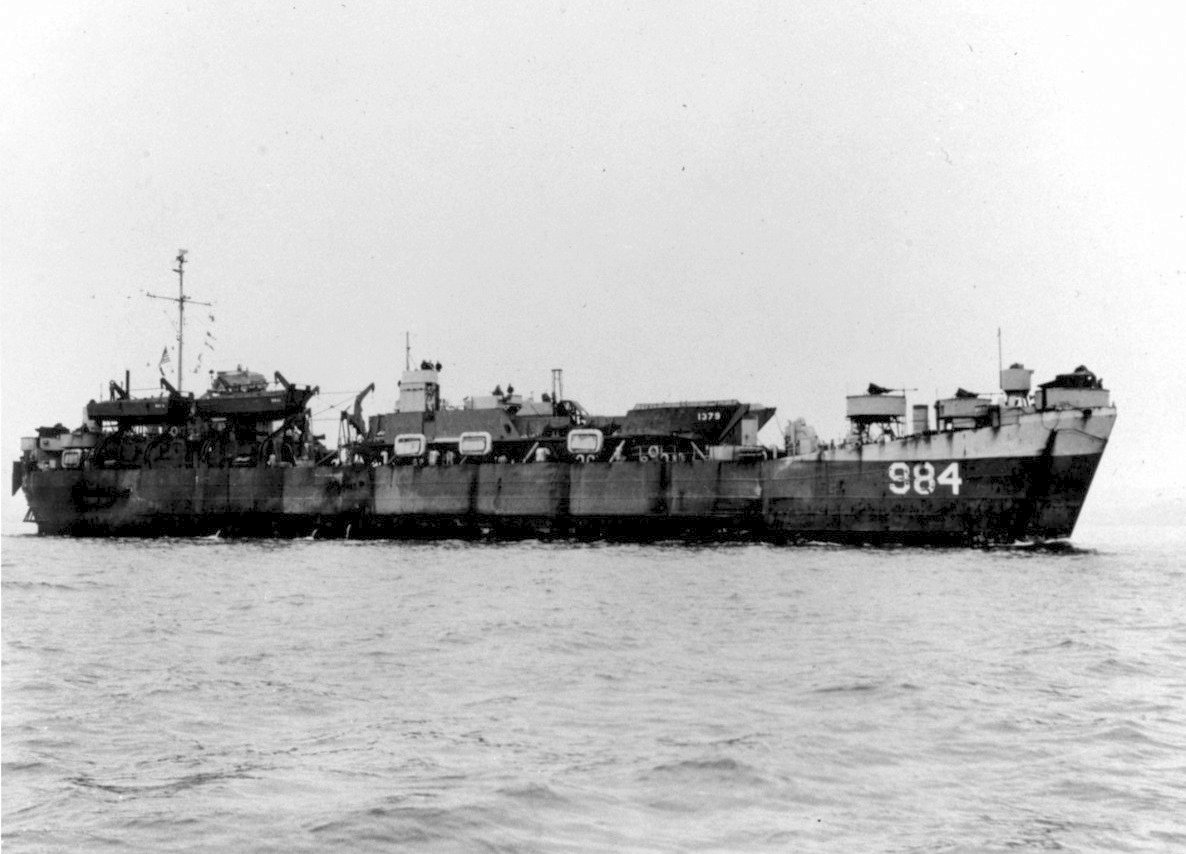
- LST-984 under way in San Francisco Bay in 1946, with LCT(6)-1379 loaded on her main deck.

History

United States
- Name: USS LST-984
- Builder: Boston Navy Yard
- Laid down: 3 January 1944
- Launched: 25 February 1944
- Commissioned: 1 April 1944
- Decommissioned: 25 June 1946
- Stricken: 31 July 1946
- Identification: IMO number: 8754865
- Fate: Sold, 19 June 1948

General characteristics
- Class & type: LST-542-class tank landing ship
- Displacement: 1,490 long tons (1,514 t) light; 4,080 long tons (4,145 t) full
- Length: 328 ft (100 m)
- Beam: 50 ft (15 m)
- Draft: 8 ft (2.4 m) forward; 14 ft 4 in (4.37 m) aft
- Propulsion: 2 × General Motors 12-567 diesel engines, two shafts
- Speed: 10.8 knots (20.0 km/h; 12.4 mph)
- Complement: 7 officers, 104 enlisted men
- Armament: 6 × 40 mm guns; 6 × 20 mm guns

USS LST-984 was an LST-542-class tank landing ship in the United States Navy. Like many of her class, she was not named and is properly referred to by her hull designation.

LST-984 was laid down on 3 January 1944 at the Boston Navy Yard; launched on 25 February 1944; sponsored by Mrs. Charles J. Donahue; and commissioned on 1 April 1944.

== Service history ==
LST-984 apparently did not see combat service during World War II.

Following World War II, LST-984 performed occupation duty in the Far East until mid-March 1946. She was decommissioned on 25 June 1946 and struck from the Navy list on 31 July that same year. On 19 June 1948, the ship was sold to the Humble Oil & Refining Co., of Houston, Texas, for operation.
