= USS LST-801 =

1944 LST-542-class tank landing ship

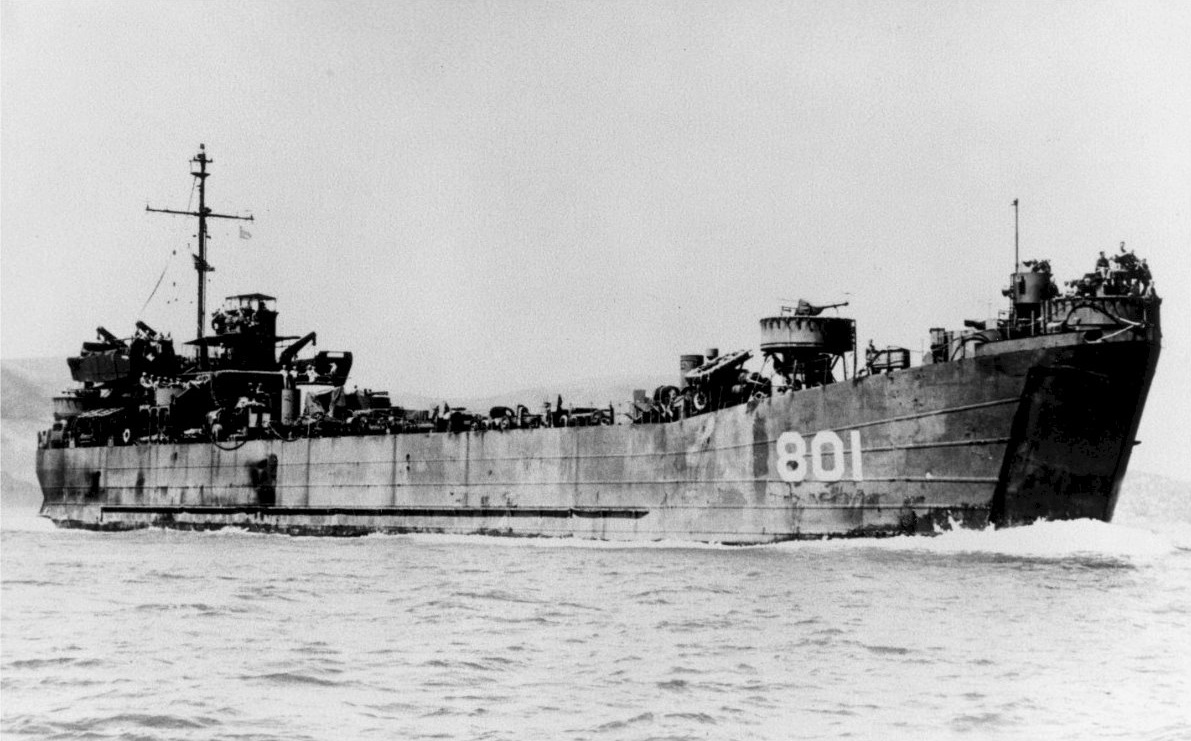
- LST-801 entering San Francisco Bay, circa July 1946

History

United States
- Name: USS LST-801
- Laid down: 6 September 1944
- Launched: 14 October 1944
- Commissioned: 8 November 1944
- Decommissioned: 18 July 1946
- Fate: Sold, 29 December 1947
- Stricken: 18 August 1946
- Honours and awards: one battle star

Argentina
- Name: ARA Cabo Buen Tiempo (BDT-13)
- Acquired: 1948
- Out of service: 1963

General characteristics
- Class & type: LST-542-class LST
- Displacement: 1,490 tons (light); 4,080 tons (full load of 2,100 tons)
- Length: 328 ft (100 m)
- Beam: 50 ft (15 m)
- Draft: 8 ft (2.4 m) forward; 14 ft 4 in (4.37 m) aft (full load)
- Propulsion: Two diesel engines, two shafts
- Speed: 10.8 knots (20 km/h) (max); 9 knots (17 km/h) (econ)
- Complement: 7 officers, 204 enlisted
- Armament: 8 × 40 mm guns; 12 × 20 mm guns

USS LST-801 was an LST-542-class tank landing ship in the United States Navy. Like many of her class, she was not named and is properly referred to by her hull designation.

== History ==
LST-801 was laid down on 6 September 1944 at Jeffersonville, Indiana, by the Jeffersonville Boat and Machine Co.; launched on 14 October 1944; sponsored by Miss Jane E. Calhoun; and commissioned on 8 November 1944.

During World War II, LST-801 was assigned to the Asiatic-Pacific theater and participated in the assault and occupation of Okinawa Gunto from March through June 1945. Following the war, LST-801 performed occupation duty in the Far East until early March 1946. She returned to the United States and was decommissioned on 18 July 1946 and struck from the Navy list on 18 August that same year. On 29 December 1947, the ship was sold to Pablo N. Ferrari & Co. for operation, and was transferred to Argentina and renamed Don Antonio.

LST-801 earned one battle star for World War II service.

=== Argentine service ===
In Argentine Navy service, Don Antonio was renamed ARA Cabo Buen Tiempo and redesignated BDT-13 (Buque Desembarco de Tanques). She was retired in 1963.
