= USS LST-872 =

1944 LST-542-class tank landing ship

History

United States
- Name: USS LST-872
- Builder: Jeffboat
- Laid down: 18 November 1944
- Launched: 28 December 1944
- Commissioned: 22 January 1945
- Decommissioned: 8 July 1946
- Fate: Sold, 27 October 1947
- Stricken: 15 August 1946

Argentina
- Name: ARA Cabo San Gonzalo (BDT-4/Q44)
- Acquired: 27 October 1947
- Out of service: 1979
- Identification: IMO number: 5402069

General characteristics
- Class & type: LST-542-class LST
- Displacement: 1,490 tons (light); 4,080 tons (full load of 2,100 tons)
- Length: 328 ft (100 m)
- Beam: 50 ft (15 m)
- Draft: 8 ft (2.4 m) forward; 14 ft 4 in (4.37 m) aft (full load)
- Propulsion: Two diesel engines, two shafts
- Speed: 10.8 knots (20 km/h) (max); 9 knots (17 km/h) (econ)
- Complement: 7 officers, 204 enlisted
- Armament: 8 × 40 mm guns; 12 × 20 mm guns

USS LST-872 was an LST-542-class tank landing ship in the United States Navy. Like many of her class, she was not named and is properly referred to by her hull designation.

== Operational history ==
LST-872 was laid down on 18 November 1944 at Jeffersonville, Indiana, by the Jeffersonville Boat & Machinery Co.; launched on 28 December 1944; sponsored by Mrs. Carrie I. Morris; and commissioned on 22 January 1945.

LST-872 performed no combat service with the United States Navy and was decommissioned on 8 July 1946 and struck from the Navy list on 15 August that same year. On 27 October 1947, she was sold to the Northwest Merchandising Service, renamed Doña Micaela and transferred to Argentina.

=== Argentine service ===
In Argentine Navy service, LST-872 was named ARA Cabo San Gonzalo and redesignated BDT-4 (Buque Desembarco de Tanques), later Q44. She was retired in 1979.
