= USS LST-558 =

United States Navy tank landing ship

History

United States
- Name: USS LST-558
- Builder: Missouri Valley Bridge and Iron Company, Evansville, Indiana
- Laid down: 11 February 1944
- Launched: 14 April 1944
- Sponsored by: Mrs. Henry Goodman
- Commissioned: 8 May 1944
- Decommissioned: 13 February 1946
- Stricken: 16 September 1947
- Honours and awards: 4 battle stars for World War II service
- Fate: Sold for scrapping, 24 May 1948

General characteristics
- Class & type: LST-542-class tank landing ship
- Displacement: 1,780 long tons (1,809 t) light; 3,640 long tons (3,698 t) full
- Length: 328 ft (100 m)
- Beam: 50 ft (15 m)
- Draft: Unloaded : 2 ft 4 in (0.71 m) forward; 7 ft 6 in (2.29 m) aft; Loaded : 8 ft 2 in (2.49 m) forward; 14 ft 1 in (4.29 m) aft
- Propulsion: 2 × General Motors 12-567 diesel engines, two shafts, twin rudders
- Speed: 12 knots (22 km/h; 14 mph)
- Boats & landing craft carried: 2 LCVPs
- Troops: Approximately 140 officers and enlisted men
- Complement: 8-10 officers, 100-115 enlisted men
- Armament: 1 × single 3"/50 caliber gun mount; 8 × 40 mm guns; 12 × 20 mm guns

USS LST-558 was a United States Navy tank landing ship in commission from 1944 to 1946.

LST-558 was laid down on 11 February 1944 at Evansville, Indiana, by the Missouri Valley Bridge and Iron Company. She was launched on 14 April 1944, sponsored by Mrs. Henry Goodman, and commissioned on 8 May 1944.

During World War II, LST-558 served in the Pacific Ocean Areas, a primarily NAvy command, and participated in the following operations:

- Capture and occupation of southern Palau Islands — September and October 1944
- Leyte landings — October and November 1944
- Lingayen Gulf landing — January 1945
- Zambales-Subic Bay — January 1945
- Iwo Jima - Assault and occupation, 19 to 25 February 1945
- Okinawa Gunto — April 1945

Following the war, LST-558 performed occupation duty in the Far East and saw service in China until early February 1946. She returned to the United States and was decommissioned on 13 February 1946 and struck from the Navy list on 16 September 1947. On 24 May 1948, she was sold to the Bethlehem Steel Company, of Bethlehem, Pennsylvania, for scrapping.

LST-558 earned four battle stars for her World War II service.
