= Russian corvette Bashkortostan =

Parchim-class corvette of the Russian Navy

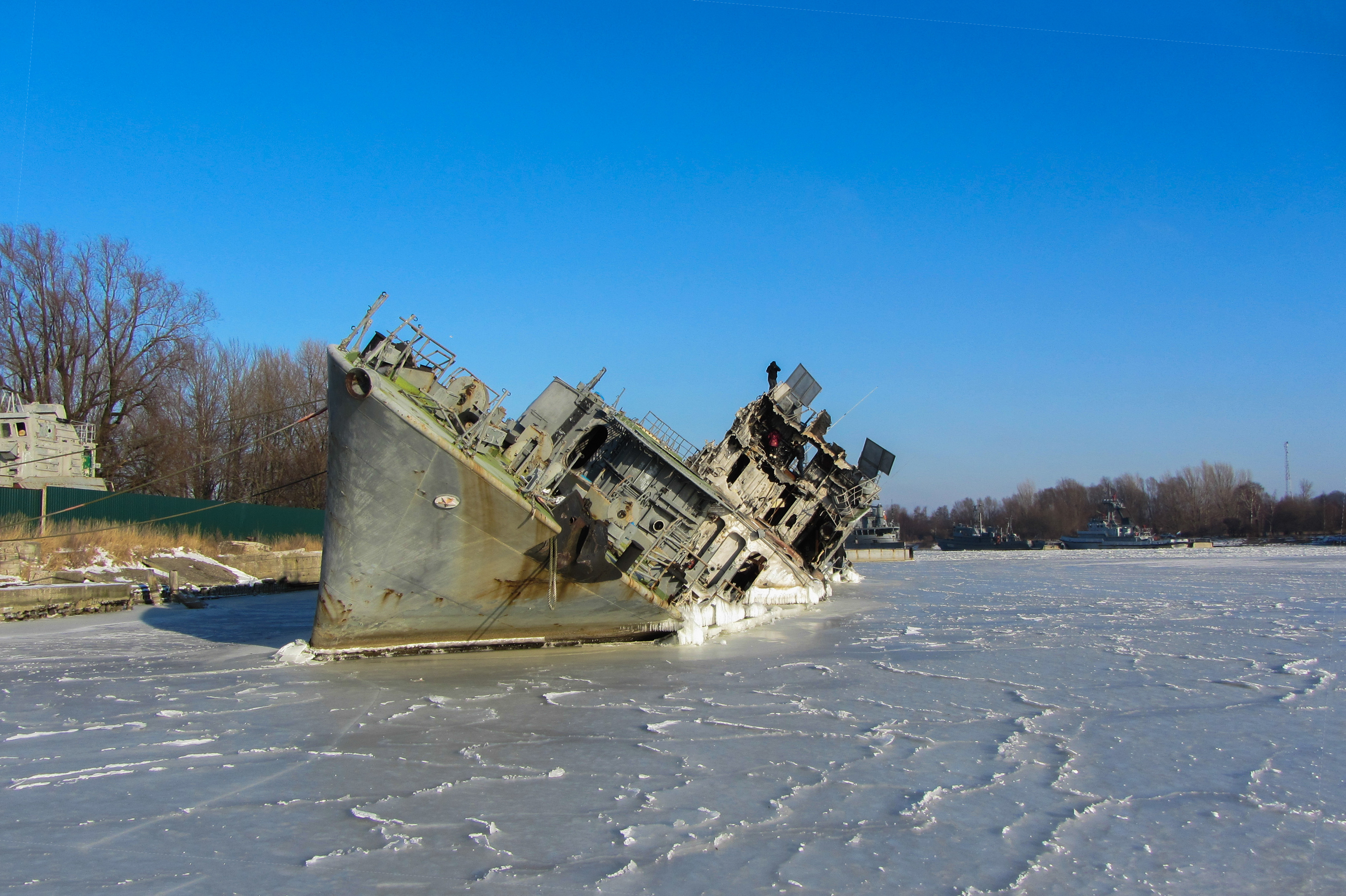
- Bashkortostan on 25 January 2014

History

Russia
- Name: MPK-228
- Builder: Peene-Werft, Wolgast
- Yard number: 383
- Laid down: 20 November 1987
- Launched: 31 October 1988
- Commissioned: 26 September 1989
- Renamed: Bashkortostan; (Башкортостан)
- Namesake: Bashkortostan
- Decommissioned: May 2010
- Identification: See Pennant numbers
- Fate: Scrapped, November 2015

General characteristics
- Class & type: Parchim-class corvette
- Displacement: 790 long tons (800 t) standard; 920 long tons (935 t) full load
- Length: 72 m (236 ft 3 in)
- Beam: 9.40 m (30 ft 10 in)
- Draught: 4.60 m (15 ft 1 in)
- Installed power: 14,250 hp (10,630 kW)
- Propulsion: 3 shaft M504 diesel engines
- Speed: 24.7 knots (45.7 km/h)
- Range: 2,100 nmi (3,900 km) at 14 knots (26 km/h; 16 mph)
- Complement: 80
- Sensors & processing systems: Positive-E, Spin Trough; Bass Tilt Hull Mounted Medium Frequency Sonar
- Armament: 1 × twin 57 mm gun AK-725; 1 × twin 30 mm gun AK-230; 2 × SA-N-5 MANPAD positions; 2 × RBU-6000 anti submarine depth charge rocket launchers; 4 × 400 mm torpedo tubes; 12 × depth charges

Bashkortostan (former MPK-228) was a Parchim-class corvette in the Soviet Navy and later Russian Navy.

== Specifications ==
Developed in the GDR by specialists from the Zelenodolsk shipyard, Captain 2nd Rank O.K. Korobkov was appointed the main observer from the Navy on the project. For the GDR Navy, 16 ships were built (in Germany, Project 133.1, Parchim), the head MPK entered service in 1981. In 1992, all ships of the Project 133.1 were sold to Indonesia. For the USSR Navy, they were built according to the 1331M Project, after the collapse of the Soviet Union, all ships were transferred to the Russian Navy. The modernized version was distinguished by updated artillery, hydroacoustic and radio-technical weapons.

Project 133.1 was developed on the basis of the IPC Project 1124 Albatross in the German Democratic Republic (GDR) with the help of specialists from the Zelenodolsk shipyard for the Navy of the National People's Army of the GDR and the Warsaw Pact countries, as well as for export sales.

Project 1331M was designed in the German Democratic Republic with the technical assistance of the Zelenodolsk Design Bureau for the USSR Navy, this project is a development of Project 133.1 and differs from it in the composition of weapons and navigation equipment.

== Construction and career ==
MPK-228 was laid down on 20 November 1987 at Peene-Werft, Wolgast. Launched on 31 October 1988 and commissioned on 26 September 1989 into the Baltic Fleet.

After the dissolution of the Soviet Union, on 26 July 1992, she was transferred from the USSR Navy to the Russian Navy.

On 2 September 1999, she was renamed Bashkortostan by the Russian Navy.

In April 2005, 20 tons of gifts were delivered to the ship's crew from Bashkiria to Baltiysk.

On 7 February 2007, a fire broke out on board the ship in Baltiysk, which began in the dry food storage room due to a short circuit in an abnormal electrical wiring. The fire of the highest category of complexity was extinguished by 13 fire engines and a fire boat of the Baltic Fleet. As a result of the fire, the bow superstructure of the ship were severely damaged.

The ship was decommissioned in May 2010 and later scrapped in November 2015.

=== Pennant numbers ===
Date	Pennant number
1989	11
1990	224
