= Russian corvette Aleksin =

Parchim-class corvette of the Russian Navy

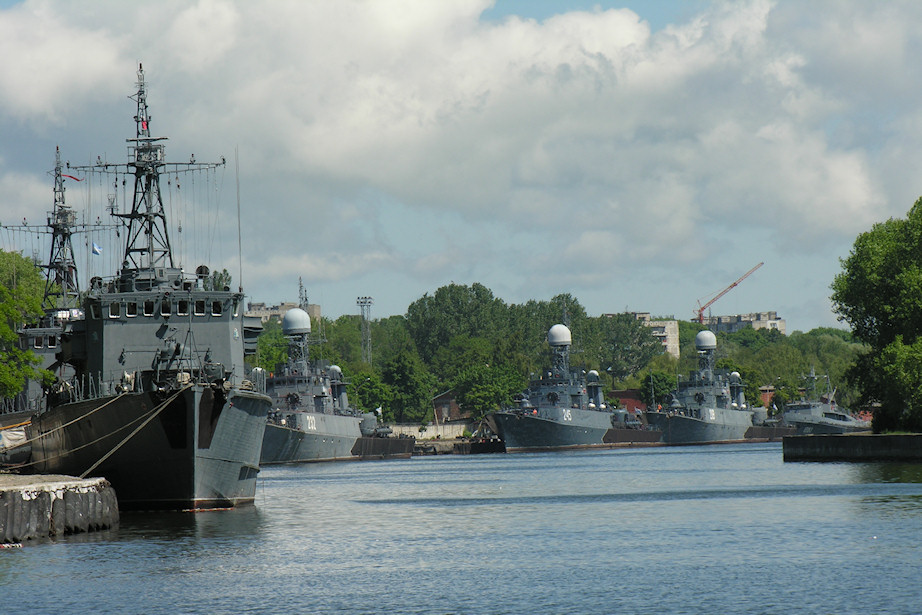
- Aleksin on 16 June 2010

History

Russia
- Name: MPK-224
- Builder: Peene-Werft, Wolgast
- Yard number: 381
- Laid down: 28 February 1987
- Launched: 30 March 1988
- Commissioned: 31 March 1989
- Renamed: Aleksin; (Алексин)
- Namesake: Aleksin
- Identification: See Pennant numbers
- Status: Active

General characteristics
- Class & type: Parchim-class corvette
- Displacement: 790 long tons (800 t) standard; 920 long tons (935 t) full load
- Length: 72 m (236 ft 3 in)
- Beam: 9.40 m (30 ft 10 in)
- Draught: 4.60 m (15 ft 1 in)
- Installed power: 14,250 hp (10,630 kW)
- Propulsion: 3 shaft M504 diesel engines
- Speed: 24.7 knots (45.7 km/h)
- Range: 2,100 nmi (3,900 km) at 14 knots (26 km/h; 16 mph)
- Complement: 80
- Sensors & processing systems: Positive-E, Spin Trough; Bass Tilt Hull Mounted Medium Frequency Sonar
- Armament: 1 × twin 57 mm gun AK-725; 1 × twin 30 mm gun AK-230; 2 × SA-N-5 MANPAD positions; 2 × RBU-6000 anti submarine depth charge rocket launchers; 4 × 400 mm torpedo tubes; 12 × depth charges

Aleksin (former MPK-224) is a Parchim-class corvette in the Soviet Navy and later Russian Navy.

== Specifications ==
Developed in the GDR by specialists from the Zelenodolsk shipyard, Captain 2nd Rank O.K. Korobkov was appointed the main observer from the Navy on the project. For the GDR Navy, 16 ships were built (in Germany, Project 133.1, Parchim), the head MPK entered service in 1981. In 1992, all ships of the Project 133.1 were sold to Indonesia. For the USSR Navy, they were built according to the 1331M Project, after the collapse of the USSR, all ships were transferred to the Russian Navy. The modernized version was distinguished by updated artillery, hydroacoustic and radio-technical weapons.

Project 133.1 was developed on the basis of the IPC Project 1124 Albatross in the German Democratic Republic (GDR) with the help of specialists from the Zelenodolsk shipyard for the Navy of the National People's Army of the GDR and the Warsaw Pact countries, as well as for export sales.

Project 1331M was designed in the German Democratic Republic with the technical assistance of the Zelenodolsk Design Bureau for the USSR Navy, this project is a development of Project 133.1 and differs from it in the composition of weapons and navigation equipment.

== Construction and career ==
MPK-224 was laid down on 28 February 1987 at Peene-Werft, Wolgast. Launched on 30 March 1988 and commissioned on 31 March 1989 into the Baltic Fleet.

In 1990 and 1993, as part of the KPUG, he became the owner of the Navy Commander's Prize for anti-submarine warfare.

On 5 March 2005, the ship was renamed Aleksin as the city of Aleksin in the Tula region is patronizing the ship.

In 2010, the interim commander of the IPC signed an inaccurate act of acceptance of the repair work performed on the ship and certified it with the seal of the military unit. On the basis of this document, the military department transferred more than 2.3 million rubles to a commercial organization. According to the investigation, virtually no work was carried out on the ship. Criminal case initiated.

At the end of 2014, he was recognized as the best in the combination of ships to guard the water area of the Baltic Fleet.

In May 2016, it became known that the ship sonar systems MGK-335MS, as well as the MG-339T Shelon-T descent stations, would be repaired.

On 2 August 2017, the IPC was involved in anti-submarine exercises in the Baltic Sea.

On 5 September 2017, the ship completed the tasks of searching for and destroying a simulated enemy submarine.

The ship remained active as of 2026.

=== Pennant numbers ===
Date	Pennant number
1989	09
1990	218
