= KRI Tjiptadi =

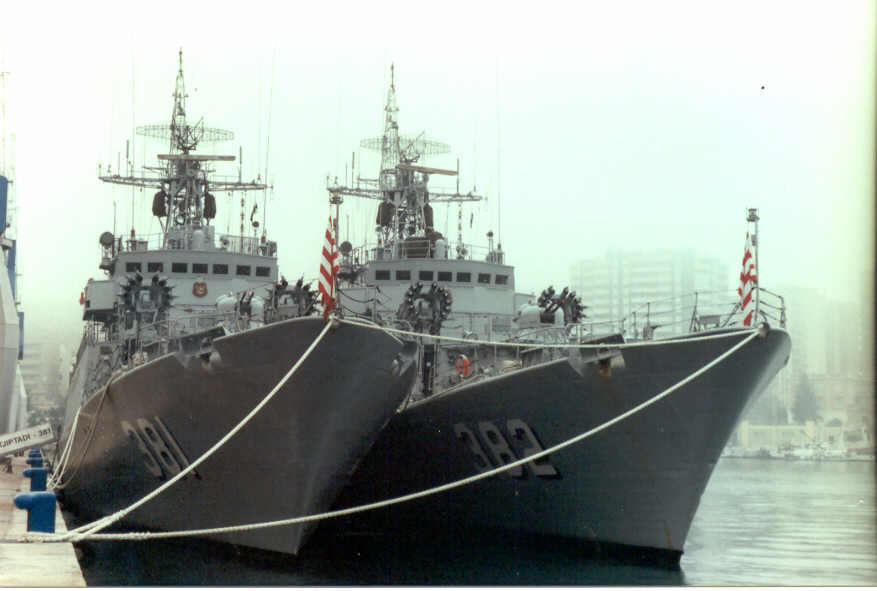
- Tjiptadi (left) in Málaga, 1994.

History

East Germany
- Name: Bergen
- Namesake: Bergen
- Builder: Peene-Werft, Wolgast
- Commissioned: 10 February 1985
- Decommissioned: 1996
- Identification: Hull number: 213
- Fate: Sold to Indonesia

Indonesia
- Name: Tjiptadi
- Namesake: Captain Ciptadi
- Commissioned: 10 May 1996
- Identification: Pennant number: 381
- Status: In service

General characteristics
- Type: Parchim-class corvette
- Displacement: 865 tonnes (standard); 935 tonnes (fully loaded)
- Length: 75.2 m (247 ft)
- Beam: 9.78 m (32.1 ft)
- Draft: 2.65 m (8.7 ft)
- Propulsion: 3 x 4750 hp M-504A diesel (total 14.250 hp); 3 fixed pitch propellers; 1 x 500 kW diesel generator; 2 x 200 kW diesel generators
- Speed: 24.5 knots (45.4 km/h)
- Range: 2,100 nautical miles (4,000 km) at 14 knots (26 km/h)
- Complement: 62 crew
- Armament: as Bergen; 1 x twin 57 mm gun AK-725; 1 x twin 30 mm gun AK-230; 2 x SA-N-5 MANPAD positions; 2 x RBU-6000 ASW rocket launcher; 4 x 400 mm torpedo tubes; as KRI Tjiptadi; 1 x twin 57 mm gun AK-725; 1 x twin 30 mm gun AK-230; 2 x 20 mm gun Denel GI-2; 2 x RBU-6000 ASW rocket launcher

KRI Tjiptadi (381) is a Parchim-class corvette currently operated by the Indonesian Navy. Prior to 1996, the Tjiptadi was part of the East German Volksmarine, as the Bergen (213).

== Specifications ==
Tjiptadi, being a Parchim-class corvette, has a displacement of 865 tonnes as standard and up to 935 tonnes when fully loaded. Ships of the class have lengths of 75.2 metres (247 ft) and a beam of 9.78 metres (32.1 ft), with a draft of 2.65 metres (8.7 ft). It has a maximum speed of 24.5 knots (45.4 km/h) and a range of 2,500 nautical miles (4,600 km) at 12 knots (22 km/h). Her propulsion of 3 fixed pitch propellers powered by 3 diesel generators, one 500 kW and two 200 kW.

== Armaments ==
As part of her armaments, Tjiptadi possesses the RBU-6000 anti-submarine weapon rocket launcher.

== Service history ==
The ship was initially part of the East German Volksmarine, developed as small anti-submarine ships. The Bergen (213) was built by Peene-Werft and was commissioned on 10 February 1985. Following the end of the Cold War and the reunification of Germany, Bergen was sold to the Indonesian Navy, alongside 15 other Parchim-class corvettes and 23 other vessels in a US$12.7 million deal. She was renamed Tjiptadi and was commissioned on 10 May 1996, following modifications.

Tjiptadi was assigned to the Indonesian Navy's Western Fleet Command (Koarmabar). In 2015, she participated in a coordinated patrol with the Indian Navy. She also participated in the search for the crashed Indonesia AirAsia Flight 8501.

On 27 April 2019, Tjiptadi was involved in a deliberate collision incident with two Vietnam Fisheries Resources Surveillance (VFRS) vessels (KN 264 and KN 231) in the South China Sea (or the North Natuna Sea). Tjiptadi was conducting patrols in the area, and according to statements from the Indonesian Navy, attempted to apprehend a Vietnamese fishing vessel which was fishing illegally in the Indonesian EEZ. The waters - which according to Indonesian sources was located 161 nautical miles (298 km) from the Riau Islands - were also claimed by Vietnam. KN 264 deliberately collided with Tjiptadi's starboard side, though the latter did not open fire. The apprehended Vietnamese fishing boat sank in the incident due to being rammed by KN 231, though 12 of her crew had been brought on board Tjiptadi and was transferred to the Indonesian Navy base in Ranai while 2 other crew members were taken by the Vietnamese vessels.

In January 2020, Tjiptadi encountered and drove out a Chinese Coast Guard patrol boat along with a number of fishing boats in the waters of Natuna Islands. In 2021, she took part in search and rescue operations following the crash of Sriwijaya Air Flight 182.
