= Russian corvette MPK-213 =

Parchim-class corvette of the Russian Navy

History

Russia
- Name: MPK-213
- Builder: Peene-Werft, Wolgast
- Yard number: 378
- Laid down: 8 April 1986
- Launched: 28 February 1987
- Commissioned: 29 July 1988
- Decommissioned: 28 May 2004
- Identification: See Pennant numbers
- Fate: Scrapped

General characteristics
- Class & type: Parchim-class corvette
- Displacement: 790 long tons (800 t) standard; 920 long tons (935 t) full load
- Length: 72 m (236 ft 3 in)
- Beam: 9.40 m (30 ft 10 in)
- Draught: 4.60 m (15 ft 1 in)
- Installed power: 14,250 hp (10,630 kW)
- Propulsion: 3 shaft M504 diesel engines
- Speed: 24.7 knots (45.7 km/h)
- Range: 2,100 nmi (3,900 km) at 14 knots (26 km/h; 16 mph)
- Complement: 80
- Sensors & processing systems: Positive-E, Spin Trough; Bass Tilt Hull Mounted Medium Frequency Sonar
- Armament: 1 × twin 57 mm gun AK-725; 1 × twin 30 mm gun AK-230; 2 × SA-N-5 MANPAD positions; 2 × RBU-6000 anti submarine depth charge rocket launchers; 4 × 400 mm torpedo tubes; 12 × depth charges

MPK-213 was a Parchim-class corvette in the Soviet Navy and later Russian Navy.

== Specifications ==
Developed in the GDR by specialists from the Zelenodolsk shipyard, Captain 2nd Rank O.K. Korobkov was appointed the main observer from the Navy on the project. For the GDR Navy, 16 ships were built (in Germany, Project 133.1, Parchim), the head MPK entered service in 1981. In 1992, all ships of the Project 133.1 were sold to Indonesia. For the USSR Navy, they were built according to the 1331M Project, after the collapse of the USSR, all ships were transferred to the Russian Navy. The modernized version was distinguished by updated artillery, hydroacoustic and radio-technical weapons.

Project 133.1 was developed on the basis of the IPC Project 1124 Albatross in the German Democratic Republic (GDR) with the help of specialists from the Zelenodolsk shipyard for the Navy of the National People's Army of the GDR and the Warsaw Pact countries, as well as for export sales.

Project 1331M was designed in the German Democratic Republic with the technical assistance of the Zelenodolsk Design Bureau for the USSR Navy, this project is a development of Project 133.1 and differs from it in the composition of weapons and navigation equipment.

== Construction and career ==
MPK-213 was laid down on 8 April 1986 at Peene-Werft, Wolgast. Launched on 28 February 1987 and commissioned on 29 July 1988 into the Baltic Fleet.

The ship was decommissioned on 28 May 2004 and was later scrapped.

=== Pennant numbers ===
Date	Pennant number
1988	06
1988	222
1996	226
