= Russian corvette MPK-67 =

Parchim-class corvette of the Russian Navy

History

Russia
- Name: MPK-67
- Builder: Peene-Werft, Wolgast
- Yard number: 375
- Laid down: 28 March 1985
- Launched: 19 April 1986
- Commissioned: 30 June 1987
- Decommissioned: 22 June 2005
- Identification: See Pennant numbers
- Fate: Scrapped

General characteristics
- Class & type: Parchim-class corvette
- Displacement: 790 long tons (800 t) standard; 920 long tons (935 t) full load
- Length: 72 m (236 ft 3 in)
- Beam: 9.40 m (30 ft 10 in)
- Draught: 4.60 m (15 ft 1 in)
- Installed power: 14,250 hp (10,630 kW)
- Propulsion: 3 shaft M504 diesel engines
- Speed: 24.7 knots (45.7 km/h)
- Range: 2,100 nmi (3,900 km) at 14 knots (26 km/h; 16 mph)
- Complement: 80
- Sensors & processing systems: Positive-E, Spin Trough; Bass Tilt Hull Mounted Medium Frequency Sonar
- Armament: 1 × twin 57 mm gun AK-725; 1 × twin 30 mm gun AK-230; 2 × SA-N-5 MANPAD positions; 2 × RBU-6000 anti submarine depth charge rocket launchers; 4 × 400 mm torpedo tubes; 12 × depth charges

MPK-67 was a Parchim-class corvette in the Soviet Navy and later Russian Navy.

== Specifications ==
Developed in the GDR by specialists from the Zelenodolsk shipyard, Captain 2nd Rank O.K. Korobkov was appointed the main observer from the Navy on the project. For the GDR Navy, 16 ships were built (in Germany, Project 133.1, Parchim), the head MPK entered service in 1981. In 1992, all ships of the Project 133.1 were sold to Indonesia. For the USSR Navy, they were built according to the 1331M Project, after the collapse of the USSR, all ships were transferred to the Russian Navy. The modernized version was distinguished by updated artillery, hydroacoustic and radio-technical weapons.

Project 133.1 was developed on the basis of the IPC Project 1124 Albatross in the German Democratic Republic (GDR) with the help of specialists from the Zelenodolsk shipyard for the Navy of the National People's Army of the GDR and the Warsaw Pact countries, as well as for export sales.

Project 1331M was designed in the German Democratic Republic with the technical assistance of the Zelenodolsk Design Bureau for the USSR Navy, this project is a development of Project 133.1 and differs from it in the composition of weapons and navigation equipment.

== Construction and career ==
MPK-67 was laid down on 28 March 1985 at Peene-Werft, Wolgast. Launched on 19 April 1986 and commissioned on 30 June 1987 into the Baltic Fleet.

On 28 July 1991, he was the last participant of the solemn parade of the Navy in Liepaja, the last parade of the Soviet Navy.

The ship was decommissioned on 22 June 2005 and later sold for scrap.

=== Pennant numbers ===
| Date | Pennant number |
|---|---|
| 1987 | 03 |
| 1987 | 233 |
| 1990 | 242 |
| 1997 | 301 |
