= Russian corvette Urengoy =

Parchim-class corvette of the Russian Navy

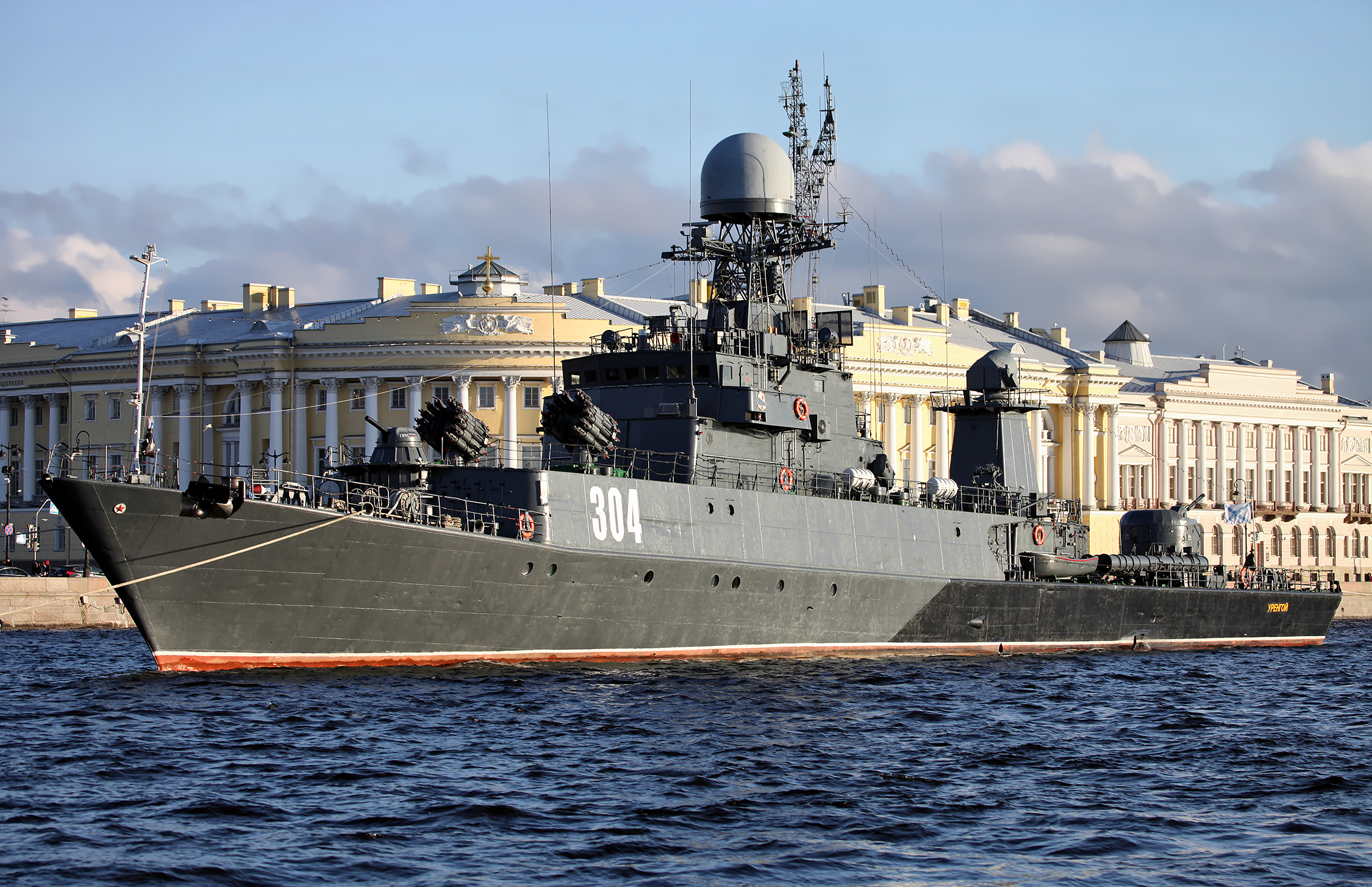
- Urengoy on 11 May 2015

History

Russia
- Name: MPK-192
- Builder: Peene-Werft, Wolgast
- Yard number: 373
- Laid down: 25 February 1985
- Launched: 29 August 1985
- Commissioned: 19 December 1986
- Renamed: Urengoy; (Уренгой)
- Namesake: Urengoy
- Identification: See Pennant numbers
- Status: Active

General characteristics
- Class & type: Parchim-class corvette
- Displacement: 790 long tons (800 t) standard; 920 long tons (935 t) full load
- Length: 72 m (236 ft 3 in)
- Beam: 9.40 m (30 ft 10 in)
- Draught: 4.60 m (15 ft 1 in)
- Installed power: 14,250 hp (10,630 kW)
- Propulsion: 3 shaft M504 diesel engines
- Speed: 24.7 knots (45.7 km/h)
- Range: 2,100 nmi (3,900 km) at 14 knots (26 km/h; 16 mph)
- Complement: 80
- Sensors & processing systems: Positive-E, Spin Trough; Bass Tilt Hull Mounted Medium Frequency Sonar
- Armament: 1 × twin 57 mm gun AK-725; 1 × twin 30 mm gun AK-230; 2 × SA-N-5 MANPAD positions; 2 × RBU-6000 anti submarine depth charge rocket launchers; 4 × 400 mm torpedo tubes; 12 × depth charges

Urengoy (former MPK-192) is a Parchim-class corvette in the Soviet Navy and later Russian Navy.

== Specifications ==
Developed in the German Democratic Republic by specialists from the Zelenodolsk shipyard, Captain 2nd Rank O.K. Korobkov was appointed the main observer from the Soviet Navy on the project. For the East German Navy, 16 ships were built (in Germany, Project 133.1, Parchim), the head MPK entered service in 1981. In 1992, all ships of the Project 133.1 were sold to Indonesia. For the USSR Navy, they were built according to the 1331M Project, after the collapse of the USSR, all ships were transferred to the Russian Navy. The modernized version was distinguished by updated artillery, hydroacoustic and radio-technical weapons.

Project 133.1 was developed on the basis of the IPC Project 1124 Albatross in the GDR with the help of specialists from the Zelenodolsk shipyard for the Navy of the National People's Army of the GDR and the Warsaw Pact countries, as well as for export sales.

Project 1331M was designed in the German Democratic Republic with the technical assistance of the Zelenodolsk Design Bureau for the USSR Navy, this project is a development of Project 133.1 and differs from it in the composition of weapons and navigation equipment.

== Construction and career ==
MPK-192 was laid down on 25 February 1985 at Peene-Werft, Wolgast. Launched on 29 August 1985 and commissioned on 19 December 1986 into the Baltic Fleet.

In 2005, the patronage of the ship was established by the Russian Party of Life.

On 28 May 2009, while trying to shoot down an aerial target during an exercise, the ship shot down the Green Grove coastal gardening area near Vyborg near St. Petersburg. Gardening suffered minor property losses. According to media reports, compensation for gardeners in the amount of 25-30 tr. provided by the crew.

On 26 May 2011, he received the name Urengoy at the request of the Administration of the Purovsky region of the Yamal-Nenets Autonomous Okrug within the established patronage relations between the administration of the Purovsky region and military unit No. 22830 of the Leningrad naval base.

At the end of June 2016, he took part in an exercise in the Gulf of Finland.

In July 2017, the ship was attracted to participate in the naval parade on the occasion of the celebration of the Day of the Navy in St. Petersburg.

In 2018, the ship was attracted to participate in the Main Naval Parade on the occasion of the Day of the Navy.

On 28 July 2019, the ship took part in the Main Naval Parade to mark the Day of the Russian Navy. The ship remained active as of 2025.

=== Pennant numbers ===
Date	Pennant number
1986	01
1987	262
1990	247
2000	304
