= Russian corvette Kazanets =

Parchim-class corvette of the Russian Navy

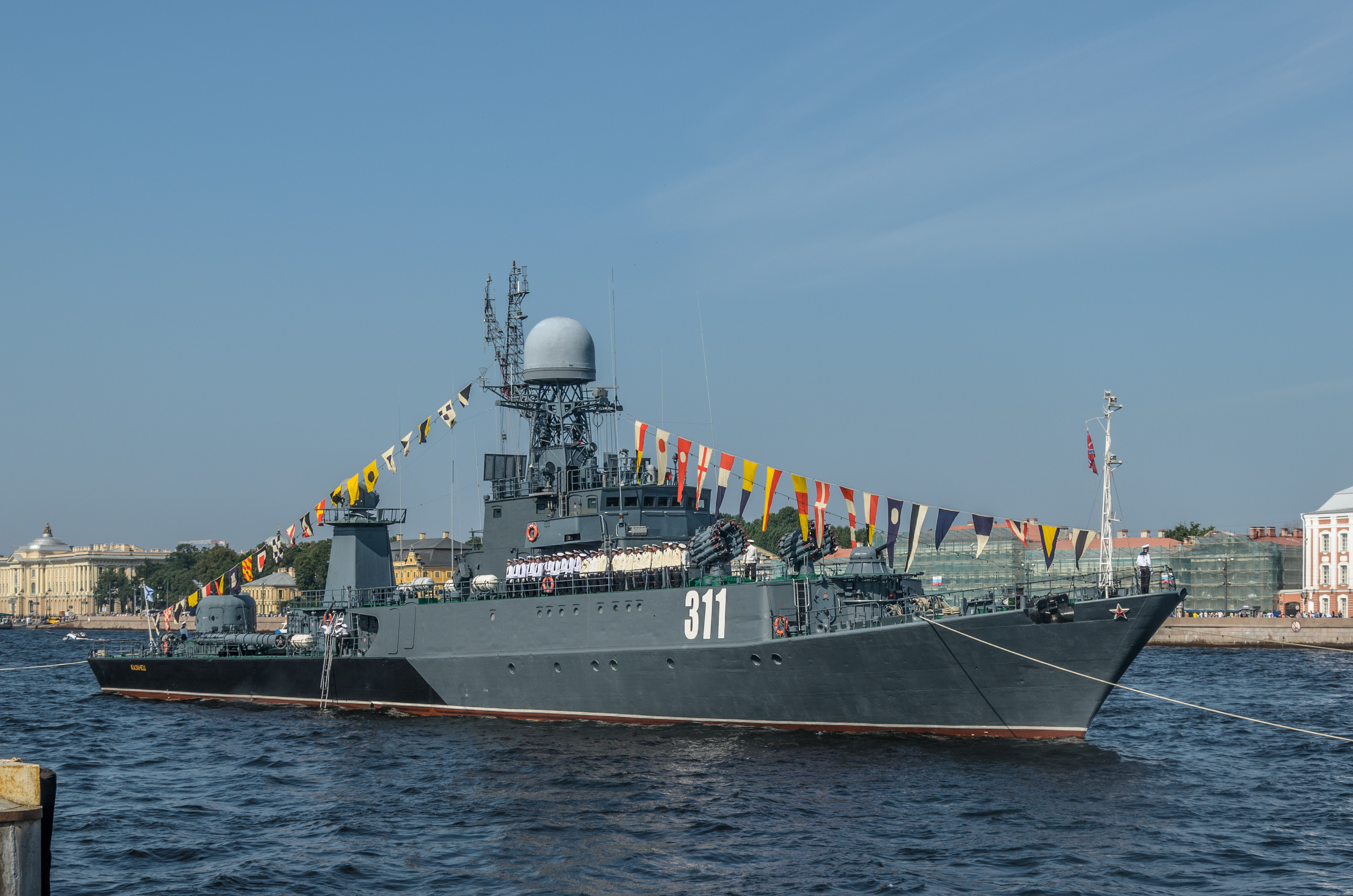
- Kazanets on 27 July 2014

History

Russia
- Name: MPK-205
- Builder: Peene-Werft, Wolgast
- Yard number: 374
- Laid down: 4 January 1985
- Launched: 28 December 1985
- Commissioned: 28 April 1986
- Renamed: Kazanets; (Казанец)
- Namesake: Ivan Kazanets
- Identification: See Pennant numbers
- Status: Active

General characteristics
- Class & type: Parchim-class corvette
- Displacement: 790 long tons (800 t) standard; 920 long tons (935 t) full load
- Length: 72 m (236 ft 3 in)
- Beam: 9.40 m (30 ft 10 in)
- Draught: 4.60 m (15 ft 1 in)
- Installed power: 14,250 hp (10,630 kW)
- Propulsion: 3 shaft M504 diesel engines
- Speed: 24.7 knots (45.7 km/h)
- Range: 2,100 nmi (3,900 km) at 14 knots (26 km/h; 16 mph)
- Complement: 80
- Sensors & processing systems: Positive-E, Spin Trough; Bass Tilt Hull Mounted Medium Frequency Sonar
- Armament: 1 × twin 57 mm gun AK-725; 1 × twin 30 mm gun AK-230; 2 × SA-N-5 MANPAD positions; 2 × RBU-6000 anti submarine depth charge rocket launchers; 4 × 400 mm torpedo tubes; 12 × depth charges

Kazanets (former MPK-205) is a Parchim-class corvette in the Soviet Navy and later Russian Navy.

== Specifications ==
Developed in the German Democratic Republic (GDR) by specialists from the Zelenodolsk shipyard, Captain 2nd Rank O.K. Korobkov was appointed the main observer from the Navy on the project. For the GDR Navy, 16 ships were built (in Germany, Project 133.1, Parchim), the head MPK entered service in 1981. In 1992, all ships of the Project 133.1 were sold to Indonesia. For the USSR Navy, they were built according to the 1331M Project, after the collapse of the USSR, all ships were transferred to the Russian Navy. The modernized version was distinguished by updated artillery, hydroacoustic and radio-technical weapons.

Project 133.1 was developed on the basis of the IPC Project 1124 Albatross in the GDR with the help of specialists from the Zelenodolsk shipyard for the Navy of the National People's Army of the GDR and the Warsaw Pact countries, as well as for export sales.

Project 1331M was designed in the German Democratic Republic with the technical assistance of the Zelenodolsk Design Bureau for the USSR Navy, this project is a development of Project 133.1 and differs from it in the composition of weapons and navigation equipment.

== Construction and career ==
MPK-205 was laid down on 4 January 1985 at Peene-Werft, Wolgast. Launched on 28 December 1985 and commissioned on 28 April 1986 into the Baltic Fleet.

In 1998, he received the name Kazanets in connection with the establishment of patronage over the ship by the Republic of Tatarstan.

At the end of June 2016, he took part in an exercise in the Gulf of Finland.

In July 2017, the ship was attracted to participate in the Main Naval Parade in Kronstadt on the occasion of the Navy Day.

In 2018, the ship was attracted to participate in the Main Naval Parade on the occasion of the Day of the Navy.

On 28 July 2019, the ship took part in the Main Naval Parade to mark the Day of the Russian Navy.

On 23 September 2020, the ship collided with a civilian ship named Ice Rose which was sailing under the flag of the Marshall Islands, in conditions of poor visibility in the Strait of Denmark. The Baltic Fleet said that the collision occurred in poor visibility, none of the Russian sailors was injured, the ship's hull received a hole. Both ships were later repaired. The ship remained active as of 2025.

=== Pennant numbers ===
Date	Pennant number
1986	02
1990	223
1998	311
