= KRI Imam Bonjol =

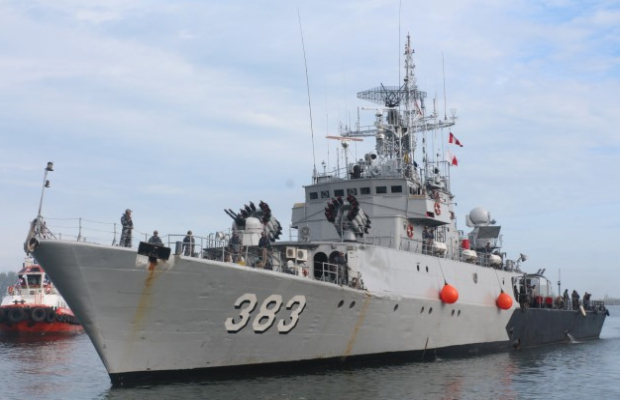
- KRI Imam Bonjol in 2016

History

East Germany
- Name: Teterow
- Namesake: Teterow
- Builder: Peene-Werft, Wolgast
- Laid down: 1 July 1981
- Launched: 27 March 1982
- Commissioned: 27 January 1984
- Decommissioned: 2 October 1990
- Identification: Hull number: 234
- Fate: Integrated with unified German Navy, 3 October 1990

Germany
- Name: Teterow
- Namesake: Teterow
- Commissioned: 3 October 1990
- Decommissioned: 1991
- Identification: Hull number: P 6168
- Fate: Laid up 1991, sold to Indonesia 1993

Indonesia
- Name: KRI Imam Bonjol
- Namesake: Tuanku Imam Bonjol
- Commissioned: 26 April 1994
- Identification: Pennant number: 383
- Status: In service

General characteristics
- Type: Parchim-class corvette
- Displacement: 865 tonnes (standard); 935 tonnes (fully loaded)
- Length: 75.2 m (247 ft)
- Beam: 9.78 m (32.1 ft)
- Draft: 2.65 m (8.7 ft)
- Propulsion: 3 x 4750 hp M-504A diesel (total 14.250 hp); 3 fixed pitch propellers; 1 x 500 kW diesel generator; 2 x 200 kW diesel generators
- Speed: 24.5 knots (45.4 km/h)
- Range: 2,100 nautical miles (4,000 km) at 14 knots (26 km/h)
- Complement: 62 crew
- Armament: as Teterow; 1 x twin 57 mm gun AK-725; 1 x twin 30 mm gun AK-230; 2 x SA-N-5 MANPAD positions; 2 x RBU-6000 ASW rocket launcher; 4 x 400 mm torpedo tubes; as KRI Imam Bonjol; 1 x twin 57 mm gun AK-725; 1 x twin 30 mm gun AK-230; 2 x 20 mm gun Denel GI-2; 2 x RBU-6000 ASW rocket launcher

KRI Imam Bonjol (383) is a Parchim-class corvette currently operated by the Indonesian Navy. Prior to 1994, the Imam Bonjol was part of the East German Volksmarine, as the Teterow (234).

== Specifications ==
Imam Bonjol, being a Parchim-class corvette, has a displacement of 865 tonnes as standard and up to 935 tonnes when fully loaded. Ships of the class have lengths of 75.2 metres (247 ft) and a beam of 9.78 metres (32.1 ft), with a draft of 2.65 metres (8.7 ft). It has a maximum speed of 24.5 knots (45.4 km/h) and a range of 2,500 nautical miles (4,600 km) at 12 knots (22 km/h). Her propulsion of 3 fixed pitch propellers powered by 3 diesel generators, one 500 kW and two 200 kW.

== Service history ==
The ship was initially part of the East German Volksmarine, developed as small anti-submarine ships. The Teterow (234) was built by Peene-Werft and was laid on 1 July 1981, launched the following year on 27 March 1982 and commissioned on 27 January 1984.

Following the end of the Cold War and the reunification of Germany, Teterow was formally decommissioned by Volksmarine on 2 October 1990 and integrated with the unified German Navy on 3 October. Teterow was assigned hull number P 6168 during its brief service in the German Navy and later was laid up in 1991. The ship was sold to the Indonesian Navy, alongside 15 other Parchim-class corvettes and 23 other vessels in a US$12.7 million deal. She was renamed Imam Bonjol and was commissioned on 26 April 1994, following modifications.

The Imam Bonjol was assigned to patrol waters around the Strait of Malacca in early 2016. She was part of the Indonesian Navy's Western Fleet (Koarmabar), participating in anti-piracy operations and EEZ patrols.

On 17 June 2016, Imam Bonjol received aerial reconnaissance reports of foreign fishing ships in Indonesian waters around the Natuna Archipelago, and proceeded to pursue the vessels. She fired warning shots, which according to the Chinese Ministry of Foreign Affairs injured a fisherman. One of the vessels, the Han Tan Cou (19038) was captured with her crew of 7 Chinese nationals. Chinese Coast Guard vessels shadowed the Imam Bonjol as she escorted Han Tan Cou to the Indonesian naval base at Ranai, though no fighting occurred.

President of Indonesia Joko Widodo held a limited cabinet meeting on board the Imam Bonjol shortly after the incident.
