= Russian corvette Kabardino-Balkariya =

Parchim-class corvette of the Russian Navy

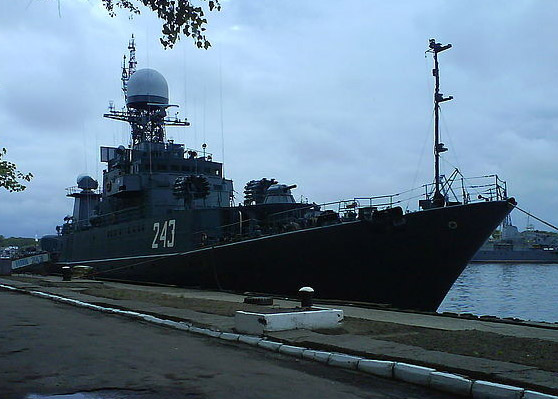
- Kabardino-Balkariya in 2009

History

Russia
- Name: MPK-227
- Builder: Peene-Werft, Wolgast
- Yard number: 382
- Laid down: 9 February 1987
- Launched: 16 August 1988
- Commissioned: 29 June 1989
- Renamed: Kabardino-Balkariya; (Кабардино-Балкария)
- Namesake: Kabardino-Balkariya
- Identification: See Pennant numbers
- Status: Active

General characteristics
- Class & type: Parchim-class corvette
- Displacement: 790 long tons (800 t) standard; 920 long tons (935 t) full load
- Length: 72 m (236 ft 3 in)
- Beam: 9.40 m (30 ft 10 in)
- Draught: 4.60 m (15 ft 1 in)
- Installed power: 14,250 hp (10,630 kW)
- Propulsion: 3 shaft M504 diesel engines
- Speed: 24.7 knots (45.7 km/h)
- Range: 2,100 nmi (3,900 km) at 14 knots (26 km/h; 16 mph)
- Complement: 80
- Sensors & processing systems: Positive-E, Spin Trough; Bass Tilt Hull Mounted Medium Frequency Sonar
- Armament: 1 × twin 57 mm gun AK-725; 1 × twin 30 mm gun AK-230; 2 × SA-N-5 MANPAD positions; 2 × RBU-6000 anti submarine depth charge rocket launchers; 4 × 400 mm torpedo tubes; 12 × depth charges

Kabardino-Balkariya (former MPK-227) is a Parchim-class corvette in the Soviet Navy and later Russian Navy.

== Specifications ==
Developed in the GDR by specialists from the Zelenodolsk shipyard, Captain 2nd Rank O.K. Korobkov was appointed the main observer from the Navy on the project. For the GDR Navy, 16 ships were built (in Germany, Project 133.1, Parchim), the head MPK entered service in 1981. In 1992, all ships of the Project 133.1 were sold to Indonesia. For the USSR Navy, they were built according to the 1331M Project, after the collapse of the USSR, all ships were transferred to the Russian Navy. The modernized version was distinguished by updated artillery, hydroacoustic and radio-technical weapons.

Project 133.1 was developed on the basis of the IPC Project 1124 Albatross in the German Democratic Republic (GDR) with the help of specialists from the Zelenodolsk shipyard for the Navy of the National People's Army of the GDR and the Warsaw Pact countries, as well as for export sales.

Project 1331M was designed in the German Democratic Republic with the technical assistance of the Zelenodolsk Design Bureau for the USSR Navy, this project is a development of Project 133.1 and differs from it in the composition of weapons and navigation equipment.

== Construction and career ==
MPK-227 was laid down on 9 February 1987 at Peene-Werft, Wolgast. Launched on 16 August 1988 and commissioned on 29 June 1989 into the Baltic Fleet.

During the period of its service, the ship visited the ports of Germany, Poland and Latvia. Repeatedly performed the tasks of military service in the Baltic and North Seas. Took part in West-2009 and West-2013. The ship 5 times as part of the ship search strike group won the Cup of the Commander-in-Chief of the Russian Navy in anti-submarine training. The IPC has successfully carried out more than 100 artillery, 80 torpedo and bombs.

On 27 January 2003, the captain of the ship, Pyotr Pavlov, was found dead in his cabin.

In 2007 and 2011 it was recognized as the best ship of the Baltic naval base guarding ships formation.

At the end of 2013, MPK-227 was recognized as the best ship in navigational training in the Russian Navy.

On 25 May 2015, the ship was renamed Kabardino-Balkariya.

On 2 August 2017, the IPC was involved in anti-submarine exercises in the Baltic Sea.

On 5 September 2017, the ship completed the tasks of searching for and destroying a simulated enemy submarine.

The ship remained active as of 2026.

=== Pennant numbers ===
Date	Pennant number
1989	10
1990	243
