= Russian corvette Kalmykia =

Parchim-class corvette of the Russian Navy

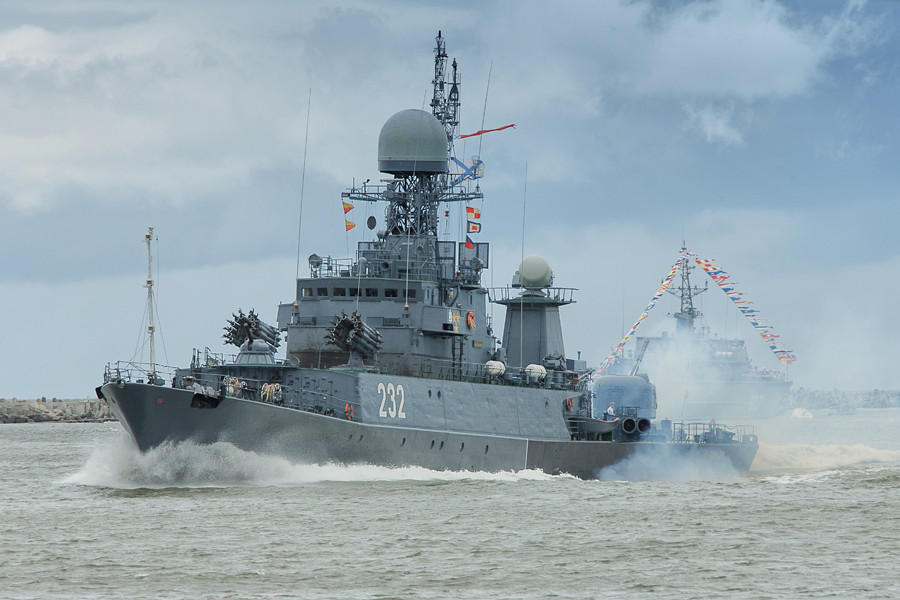
- Kalmykia on 26 July 2015

History

Russia
- Name: MPK-229
- Builder: Peene-Werft, Wolgast
- Yard number: 384
- Laid down: 23 February 1988
- Launched: 31 January 1989
- Commissioned: 6 April 1990
- Renamed: Kalmykia; (Калмыкия)
- Namesake: Kalmykia
- Identification: See Pennant numbers
- Status: Active

General characteristics
- Class & type: Parchim-class corvette
- Displacement: 790 long tons (800 t) standard; 920 long tons (935 t) full load
- Length: 72 m (236 ft 3 in)
- Beam: 9.40 m (30 ft 10 in)
- Draught: 4.60 m (15 ft 1 in)
- Installed power: 14,250 hp (10,630 kW)
- Propulsion: 3 shaft M504 diesel engines
- Speed: 24.7 knots (45.7 km/h)
- Range: 2,100 nmi (3,900 km) at 14 knots (26 km/h; 16 mph)
- Complement: 80
- Sensors & processing systems: Positive-E, Spin Trough; Bass Tilt Hull Mounted Medium Frequency Sonar
- Armament: 1 × twin 57 mm gun AK-725; 1 × twin 30 mm gun AK-230; 2 × SA-N-5 MANPAD positions; 2 × RBU-6000 anti submarine depth charge rocket launchers; 4 × 400 mm torpedo tubes; 12 × depth charges

Kalmykia (former MPK-229) is a Parchim-class corvette in the Soviet Navy and later Russian Navy.

== Specifications ==
Developed in the GDR by specialists from the Zelenodolsk shipyard, Captain 2nd Rank O.K. Korobkov was appointed the main observer from the Navy on the project. For the GDR Navy, 16 ships were built (in Germany, Project 133.1, Parchim), the head MPK entered service in 1981. In 1992, all ships of the Project 133.1 were sold to Indonesia. For the USSR Navy, they were built according to the 1331M Project, after the collapse of the USSR, all ships were transferred to the Russian Navy. The modernized version was distinguished by updated artillery, hydroacoustic and radio-technical weapons.

Project 133.1 was developed on the basis of the IPC Project 1124 Albatross in the German Democratic Republic (GDR) with the help of specialists from the Zelenodolsk shipyard for the Navy of the National People's Army of the GDR and the Warsaw Pact countries, as well as for export sales.

Project 1331M was designed in the German Democratic Republic with the technical assistance of the Zelenodolsk Design Bureau for the USSR Navy, this project is a development of Project 133.1 and differs from it in the composition of weapons and navigation equipment.

== Construction and career ==
MPK-229 was laid down on 23 February 1988 at Peene-Werft, Wolgast. Launched on 31 January 1989 and commissioned on 6 April 1990 into the Baltic Fleet.

Since 19 April 1996, he bears the name Kalmykia in honor of the Republic of Kalmykia patronizing over it.

In 1992 and 1993, as part of the KPUG, he became the owner of the Navy Commander's Prize for anti-submarine warfare.

In May 2000, as part of a detachment of warships of the Baltic Fleet, he participated in the ceremony of giving military honors to the sailors of the Soviet submarine S-8, which sank in August 1941 in the Baltic Sea.

In June 2007, he took part in the exercises of the search and rescue forces of the Baltic Fleet to provide assistance to an emergency submarine.

The Republic of Kalmykia has not maintained patronage ties with the ship for many years.

On 26 July 2015, the ship took part in the naval parade on Navy Day in Baltiysk.

On 6 April 2016, an emergency occurred on board the ship: 29-year-old midshipman Rinat Kinzhabayev was shot dead in his cabin while staying in Baltiysk. A criminal case was initiated against the senior midshipman of Kalmykia.

In May 2016, it became known that the ship sonar systems MGK-335MS, as well as the MG-339T Shelon-T descent stations.

As of the end of 2018, the ship was in the combat composition of the Russian Navy.

As of 2019, the ship is undergoing repairs.

=== Pennant numbers ===
Date	Pennant number
1989	12
1990	232
