= Parchim-class corvette =

East German anti-submarine ship

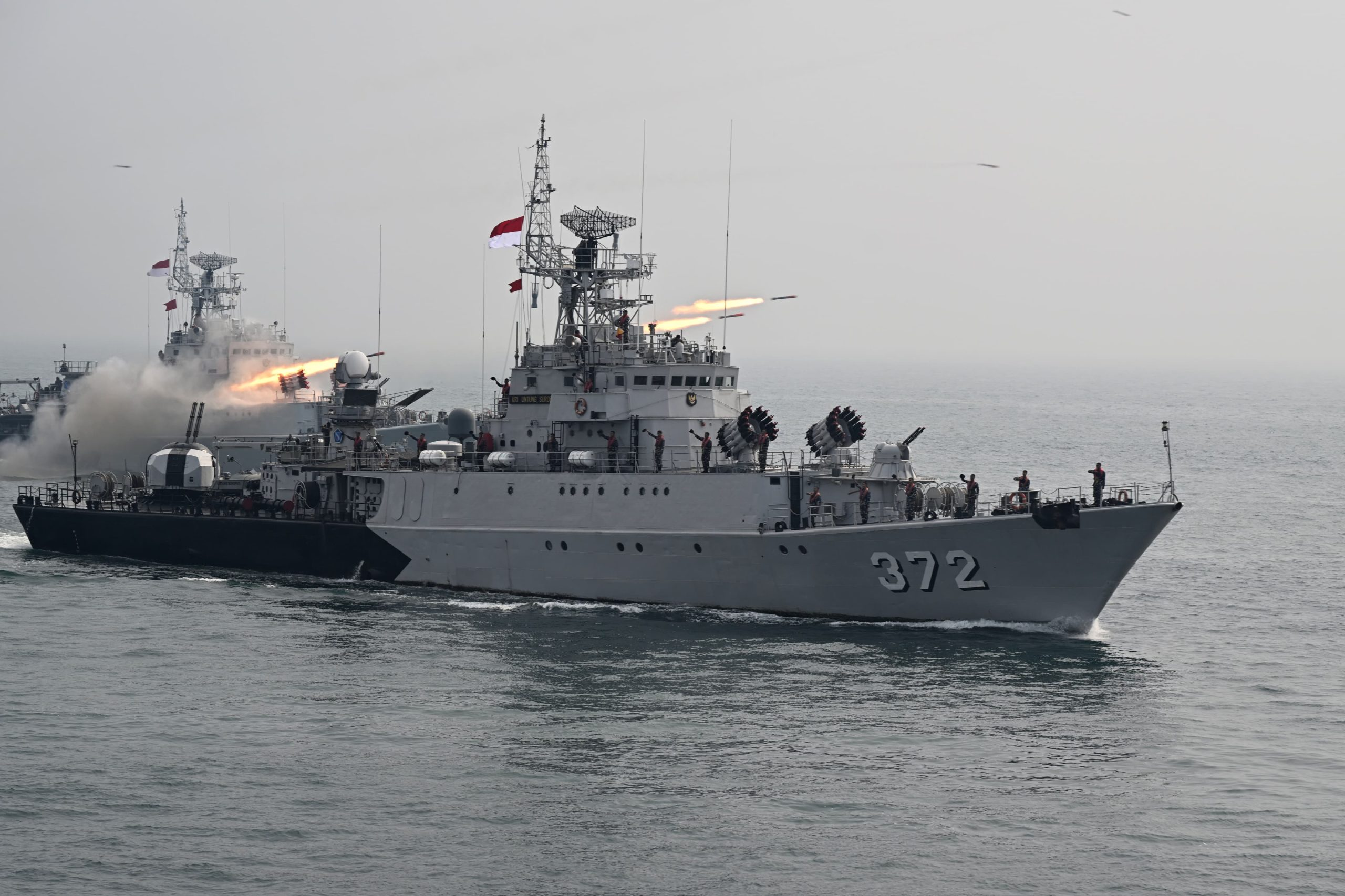
- Indonesian corvette KRI Untung Surapati and RBU-6000 anti-submarine rockets

Class overview
- Name: Parchim class
- Builders: Peene-Werft, Wolgast
- Operators: Volksmarine; German Navy; Soviet Navy; Russian Navy; Indonesian Navy
- Built: 1985–1989
- Completed: 28
- Active: 14 active in Indonesia, 6 active in Russia (Baltic Fleet)
- Retired: 2 (Indonesian Navy); 6 (Russian Navy)

General characteristics
- Type: Anti-submarine corvette
- Displacement: 800 tons standard, 950 tons full load
- Length: 72 m (236 ft 3 in)
- Beam: 9.40 m (30 ft 10 in)
- Draught: 4.60 m (15 ft 1 in)
- Installed power: 14,250 hp (10,630 kW)
- Propulsion: 3 shaft M504 diesels
- Speed: 24.7 knots (45.7 km/h)
- Range: 2,100 nmi (3,900 km) at 14 knots (26 km/h; 16 mph)
- Complement: 80
- Sensors & processing systems: Radar: Positive-E, Spin Trough; Bass Tilt Hull Mounted Medium Frequency Sonar
- Armament: 1x twin 57 mm gun AK-725; 1x twin 30 mm gun AK-230; 2x SA-N-5 MANPAD positions; 2x RBU-6000 anti submarine depth charge rocket launchers; 4x 400 mm torpedo tubes; 12 depth charges

The Parchim-class corvette, Soviet designation Project 133.1, was developed for the East German Navy in the late 1970s, and built by the Wolgast Peene-Werft. The ships were designed for coastal anti-submarine warfare. In case of an all-out NATO-Warsaw Pact war in Europe their prime targets would have been the small U-206 coastal submarines of the West German navy. The first ship, Wismar (now the Indonesian KRI Sutanto), was launched on 6 July 1979 in Rostock, and subsequently another 15 ships were built until 1986. To make production more economical, the Soviet Union agreed to purchase another 12 ships from Wolgaster Peenewerft built between 1986 and 1990, thereby effectively subsidising the East German shipbuilding industry.

The ships of the Soviet Navy were named Parchim II by NATO (Soviet designation Project 133.1M). Though useful as a coastal ASW platform, the Soviet production of the similar but far more powerful Grisha class made this purchase even more illogical for the Soviet Navy. After German re-unification, some of the former East German ships were used briefly by the unified German Navy before all of them were sold to the Indonesian Navy in 1993. The Indonesian Navy extensively refurbished their Parchims, to the point where the refurbishing exceeded the cost of purchase. They are still in service, both in the Indonesian Navy and in the Russian Baltic Fleet.

== Construction ==
The Parchims were built to replace the obsolete HAI III-class subhunters of the Volksmarine. Because of their displacement, over 800 tons in full load, they were able to leave coastal waters, even in rough weather. Propulsion consisted of three Soviet-designed M 504 56-cylinder diesel engines, a development of the M 503 A fast attack craft engine. The middle engine provided power to a variable-pitch propeller for cruising speed, while the two outer engines served two outer fixed-pitch propellers for boost speed. Total power output was 14,250 hp (10,630 kW). The ships were constructed with regular (stainless) steel and consisted of ten waterproof compartments.

== Weapon systems and sensors ==
=== Air defence ===
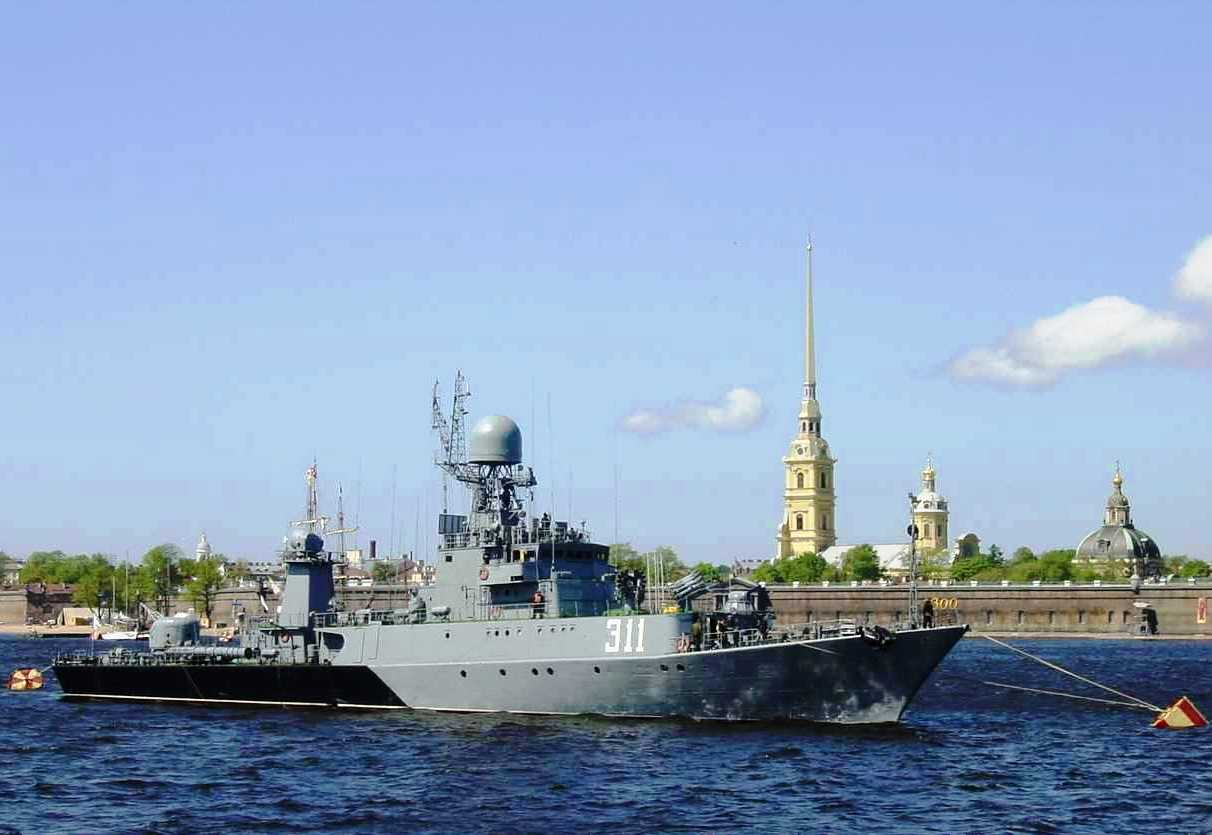
Russian corvette Kazanets, photographed before its collision in Øresund.

For air defence, the ships were equipped with one double-barrel AK-230 30 mm gun and one double-barrel AK-725 57 mm gun. The AK-725 double 57 mm AA gun, designed in 1959, was directed by the ESP-72 fire control system, which received ranging and target bearing information from an MR 103 (NATO codename 'MUFF COB') radar. The MR 103 had a 1.30 m (4.3 ft) parabolic radar dish, with an optical camera system slaved to it, as a backup system in case of failure or heavy EW environment. The barrels of the gun were water-cooled and belt-fed, with each belt containing 550 rounds, but the first round had to be manually chambered. In an emergency, the turret could be manually operated with an optical fire control system. The MR 103 radar system, already outdated when the Parchims were developed, used 1950s-style electromechanical systems, built around vacuum tubes. As a result, it was not considered to be an effective anti-missile system, or CIWS (Close-in weapon system), as was evidenced by a Soviet training accident in 1987 when a test missile drone accidentally locked in on a small Soviet Navy training vessel. Although the ship's AK-725 system kept firing until the moment of impact, no hits were scored and the ship was destroyed by the resulting fire, allegedly killing 39 crew members.

The AK-230 gun was a fully automatic, stabilized, NN-30 double-barrel, water-cooled, four-chamber revolver cannon. The guns had a 1,000 round per minute (rpm) rate of fire and were fed by independent 500 round ammunition belts. The regular associated radar system was the (NATO codename) DRUM TILT radar, which was not used in the Parchim class. According to some sources the AK-230 could not only be linked with the DRUM TILT but also with the MUFF COB radar system, but this is disputed by old East German naval sources. According to these East German sources, the AK-230 gun on the Parchim-class corvette was optically guided, thereby leaving the Parchim class without an effective CIWS, and therefore unable to counter anti-shipping missiles.

There were also two SA-N-5 (Naval SA-7 or Strela II) MANPAD positions aboard the Parchims. But without an effective, radar guided SAM missile system, the Parchims were left completely vulnerable to enemy precision guided anti-shipping weapons. This was a major restriction and confined the Parchims to brown water coastal operations, close to the protective air force and air defence umbrella.

The air search radar was the ubiquitous (NATO codename) STRUT CURVE radar. This radar had a 4 m (13 ft) parabolic radar dish, worked in the F-band frequency, and had a respectable 60 nautical miles (110 km) radar range against aircraft flying at 5,000 m (16,000 ft) height, and a less respectable 20 nautical miles (40 km) radar range against surface shipping or low flying aircraft. The electronic defense suite was very basic, and consisted of an IFF (Identification Friend or Foe) receiver and transmitter, and an 'ELOKA' multiband passive RWR antenna slaved to a double 16-cell chaff dispenser. All in all, air defence — or the lack of one — was a very restrictive factor in the tactical usefulness of the Parchim design.

=== Anti-submarine warfare ===
A major evolution over the old HAI III design was the new hydro-acoustic system. The sonar suite consisted of a bow sonar and a variable depth dipping sonar. The sonar screen was panoramic, meaning that it gave a two dimensional radarscope-like view of the surrounding waters. This was a major improvement over the old auditive system in the HAI III class. Another weakness of the old HAI III was its inability to 'see through' water layers with different temperatures. While sound propagates pretty well in water of the same temperature, it gets easily disturbed by even modest differences in water temperature. Especially in the hot summer months these natural occurring phenomena give submarines an easy hide out for probable sub-chasing surface vessels. A solution is the use of a 'dipping sonar', which in a way is nothing more than a small sonar attached to a long cable. By using this device the Parchim's sonar system was able to search the different water layers.

The Parchims were also provided with capable anti-submarine warfare weapons. The 400 mm (16 in) torpedo tubes were loaded with acoustical and/or wire guided torpedoes. This gave the Parchims a precision submarine strike capability. The two RBU-6000 depth charge rocket launchers created a barrier defense against submarines, incoming torpedoes and frogmen. Though relatively unsophisticated by western standards, the RBU-6000 was a very successful and popular system, used on many small or large surface ships. It consisted of a twelve launch tubes for unguided rockets, armed with a compact but powerful depth charge. Rockets were directed by simply changing the angle of the tubes and thereby the ballistics of the unguided rockets. The launcher could elevate between -15° and +60°, and could traverse 180°, with each launcher thus covering one side of the ship. Range was between 350 m and 6000 m, and the charges could reach 500 m deep. The rockets, RGB-60's, weighed 110 kg (240 lb) of which 25 kg (55 lb) was a high-explosive warhead. The ammunition was swiftly and automatically reloaded from a magazine below deck, by turning the tubes 90° vertically. Maximum magazine capacity was 96 rounds. The whole system was remotely directed by the Burya fire control system. The RBU-6000 could also be used for shore bombardment. The Parchims were also able to simply drop bigger and more powerful depth charges, and could transport and lay up to 60 mines.

== Overview ==
All in all, the Parchims were up to their task, namely to hunt and destroy enemy submarines in coastal waters. Because of their lack of any real anti-shipping weapons and more importantly because of the absence of a modern air defence capability, their 'blue water' (out of the coastal regions) value would indeed have been slight. This shortcoming was partially offset by Volksmarine doctrine, which regarded the Koni-class frigates, equipped with the radar guided OSA/SA-N-4 SAMs, as the cornerstone of their naval blue water air defence. In other words, in order to survive a modern naval war, they had to be escorted by radar guided SAM carriers. But, as the biggest GDR warship building project in history, the Parchim class truly was the "Höhepunkt des DDR-Kampfschiffbaus" ("Highpoint of East German warship construction".)

== Ships ==
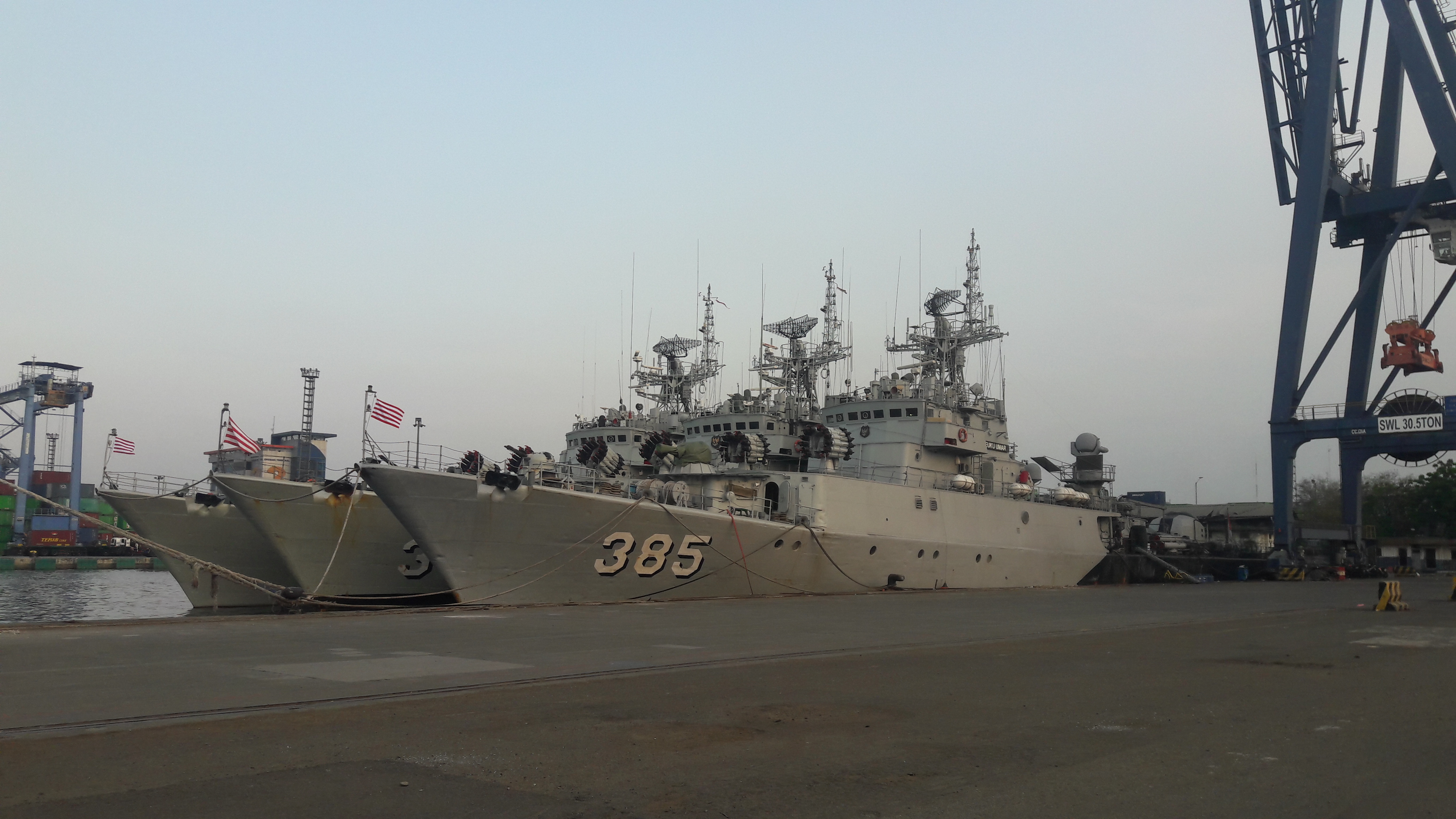
Indonesian Navy's Parchim-class corvettes in 2019

Indonesian Navy

- The 16 Parchims from the GDR were purchased by Indonesia in 1992 in a deal worth US$12.7 million arranged by then Minister of Research and Technology, B.J. Habibie. The transfer from the Volksmarine also included 14 Frosch-class landing ships and 9 Kondor-class minesweepers.
- The Parchims, also known as the Kapitan Pattimura-class underwent a significant rehabilitation which included air-conditioning and engine replacements in 2005.
- All the twin 57 mm AK-725 and twin 30 mm AK-230 gun were retained except for KRI Sultan Thaha Syaifuddin (376) & KRI Silas Papare (386) where their 30 mm AK-230 was replaced by Chinese made Type 730 CIWS. Some of the fleets MANPADS, SA-N-5 were also removed and being replaced by either one or two 20 mm autocannon. Similarly, the four 400 mm Russian-made torpedo launcher on some ship were replaced by two Mk 32 triple torpedo launcher.
- Currently 14 out of 16 original Parchims were in service with Indonesian navy.

Name (IDN)	Hull number (IDN)	Name (GDR)	Hull number (GDR)	Commissioned (GDR)	Commissioned (IDN)	Status	Notes
KRI Kapitan Pattimura	371	Prenzlau	231	11 May 1983	23 September 1993	Active	
KRI Untung Surapati	372	Ribnitz	233	29 October 1983	23 September 1993	Active	
KRI Sultan Nuku	373	Waren	224	23 November 1982	15 December 1993	Active	Initially commissioned as Nuku
KRI Lambung Mangkurat	374	Angermünde	214	26 July 1985	12 July 1994	Active	
KRI Cut Nyak Dhien	375	Lübz	221	12 February 1982	25 February 1994	Active	Served briefly in unified German Navy with hull number P 6169
KRI Sultan Thaha Syaifuddin	376	Bad Doberan	222	30 June 1982	25 February 1995	Active	
KRI Sutanto	377	Wismar	241	9 July 1981	10 March 1995	Active	Served briefly in unified German Navy with hull number P 6170
KRI Sutedi Senoputra	378	Parchim	242	9 April 1981	19 September 1994	Active	
KRI Wiratno	379	Perleberg	243	19 September 1981	19 September 1994	Active	
KRI Memet Sastrawiria	380	Bützow	244	30 December 1981	2 June 1995	Retired	Caught fire on 18 August 2008, later decommissioned
KRI Tjiptadi	381	Bergen	213	1 February 1985	10 May 1996	Active	
KRI Hasan Basri	382	Güstrow	223	10 November 1982	10 May 1996	Active	
KRI Imam Bonjol	383	Teterow	234	27 January 1984	26 April 1994	Active	Served briefly in unified German Navy with hull number P 6168
KRI Pati Unus	384	Ludwiglust	232	4 July 1983	21 July 1995	Retired	Partially sunk after hitting a shipwreck on 13 May 2016, decommissioned on 19 April 2017
KRI Teuku Umar	385	Grevesmühlen	212	21 September 1984	27 October 1996	Active	Served briefly in unified German Navy with hull number P 6164
KRI Silas Papare	386	Gadebusch	211	31 August 1984	27 October 1996	Active	Served briefly in unified German Navy with hull number P 6167

Engine	Power	Ships
2 x Deutz TBD 620 V16 diesels	6,000 hp (4.5 MW)	372, 373, 374, 377, 378, 381
2 x MTU 16V 4000 M 90 diesels	7,300 hp (5.4 MW)	371, 379, 380, 382, 383,386
2 x Caterpillar 3516B diesels	5,200 hp (3.9 MW)	375, 376, 384, 385

Armament:

- 1 x twin 57 mm gun AK-725
- 1 x twin 30 mm gun AK-230 or 1 x Type 730 CIWS (on two ship, 376 & 386)
- 2 x SA-N-5 MANPADS or 2 x 20 mm gun Autocannon (on some ship)
- 2 x RBU-6000 ASW rocket launcher
- 4 x 400 mm lightweight torpedo tubes or 2 x 324 mm triple Mk 32 torpedo launchers (on some ships)

Russian Navy

- Six ships are in service with the Baltic Fleet.

Name	Laid down	Launched	Commissioned	Status	Notes
Urengoy	25 February 1985	29 August 1985	19 December 1986	Active	
Kazanets	4 January 1985	28 December 1985	28 April 1986	Active	Damaged in 2020; repaired and active as of 2021
MPK-67	28 March 1985	19 April 1986	30 June 1987	Decommissioned in 2005	
Zelenodolsk	25 June 1985	12 August 1986	28 December 1987	Active	
MPK-105	30 December 1985	20 November 1986	16 March 1988	Decommissioned in 2014	
MPK-213	8 April 1986	28 February 1987	29 July 1988	Decommissioned in 2004	
MPK-216	22 June 1986	25 June 1987	30 September 1988	Decommissioned in 2005	
MPK-219	7 November 1986	30 September 1987	23 December 1988	Decommissioned in 2002	
Aleksin	28 February 1987	30 March 1988	31 March 1989	Active	
Kabardino-Balkariya	9 February 1987	16 August 1988	29 June 1989	Active	
Bashkortostan	20 November 1987	31 October 1988	26 September 1989	Decommissioned in 2010	
Kalmykia	23 February 1988	31 January 1989	6 April 1990	Active	

== See also ==
- List of ships of the Soviet Navy
- List of ships of Russia by project number
