= Peene-Werft =

German company

Coordinates: 54.0491667°N 13.7808333°E

Peene-Werft GmbH & Co.KG
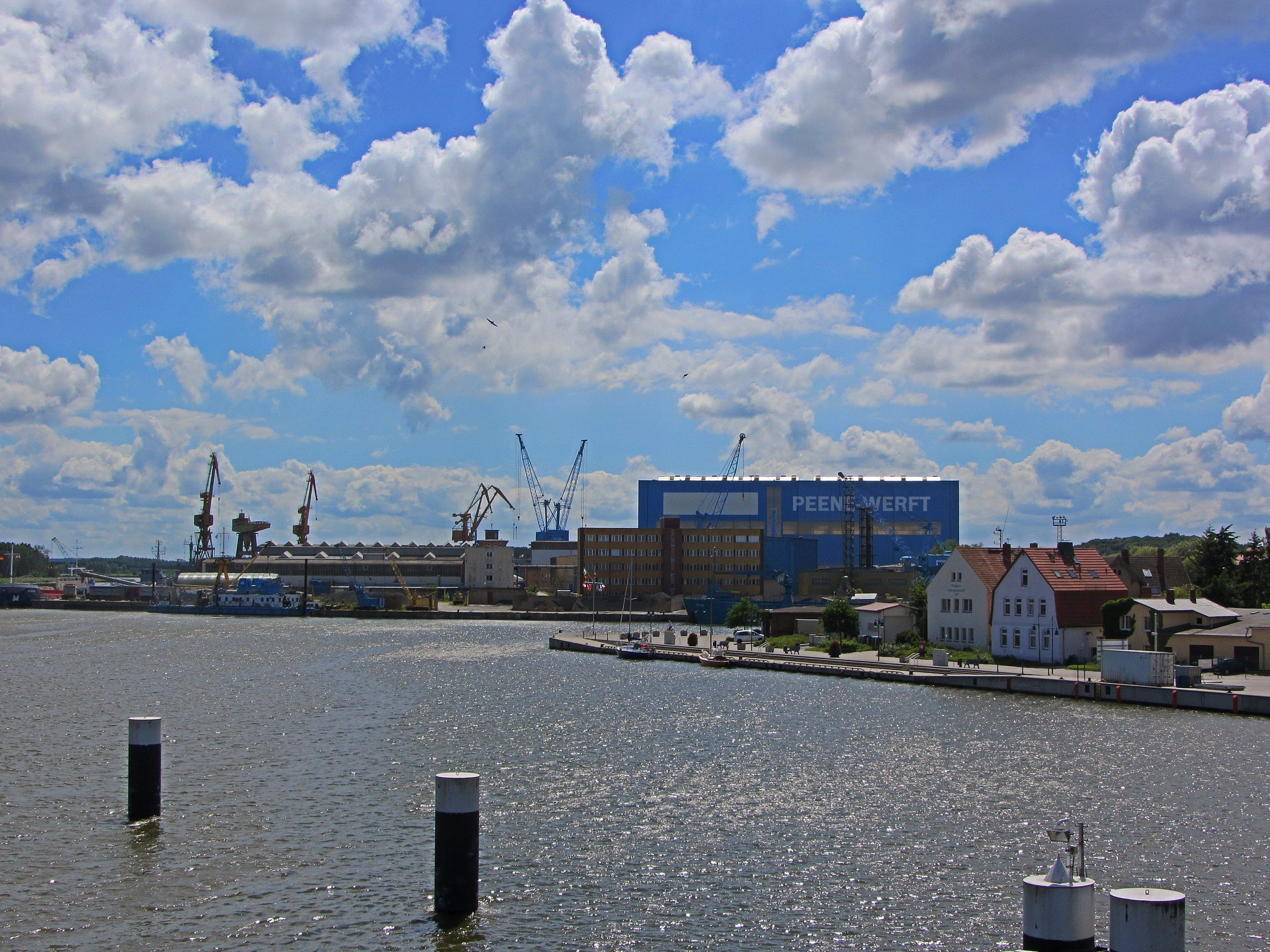
- Type: GmbH
- Industry: Shipbuilding
- Founded: 1948; 78 years ago
- Headquarters: Wolgast, Mecklenburg-Vorpommern, Germany
- Area served: worldwide
- Key people: Harald Jaekel; Ferdinand Mülhens
- Products: Yachts; Naval ships
- Revenue: € 0.2761 billion (2008)
- Owner: Rheinmetall
- Number of employees: 320
- Website: www.luerssen.de

Peene-Werft is a German shipyard in Wolgast, Mecklenburg–West Pomerania. It was part of the Bremen Lürssen Group from May 2013 until 2025, when was sold to Rheinmetall.

== Background ==
The shipyard was founded on 20 June 1948 by the Soviet military administration with significant participation of the Red Army. Initially, cutters and coasters were built as reparations for the Soviet Union. In 1951 the construction of naval ships began. The shipyard was a state-owned enterprise in the shipbuilding combine of the GDR

From 1953 till until the German reunification, mainly light torpedo speedboats (LTS boats) of Kondor-class and minesweepers in short and long form were produced at Peene shipyard. The GDR-state yacht Ostseeland was based on the long minesweeper design. The shipyard was also building landing ships and a class of Anti-submarine boats (U-Jagdtboote) for the People's Navy as Parchim-class and for the Soviet Navy as Project 133.1 were built. Almost the entire fleet of the Volksmarine were built at Peene shipyard.

In the late 1970s, a number of sea bucket chain dredgers were keeled for the USSR. In addition, in the 1980s, small cabin boats with internal combustion engines were produced as part of the “consumer goods production” prescribed by the SED. The number of employees in 1989 was around 2,900.

=== 1990s ===
In 1992, the Bremen-based Hegemann Group acquired the Peene Shipyard.

=== 2010s ===
On 7 June 2010 the shipyard was realigned; the merger of Volkswerft Stralsund GmbH and Peene-Werft GmbH resulted in P+S Werften GmbH. The shareholders were the Hegemann Group with around seven percent stake and HSW Treuhand and Beteiligungsgesellschaft mbH with around 93 percent. The number of employees was around 750 in 2012.

According to the Ostsee-Zeitung, the managing director of P+S Werften GmbH, Dieter Brammertz, declared in March 2012 that there would probably be no more shipbuilding in Wolgast; the Peene river would be too small to build larger ships, and the company would rely on the construction of sub-parts for offshore wind turbines, so-called jackets. In August 2012, P+S Werften GmbH filed for bankruptcy.

In December 2012, the Wolgast shipyard was taken over for around 17 million euros by the Lürssen Group from Bremen, which relocated the construction of two foreships for the Baden-Württemberg-class frigates of the German Navy to Wolgast. In the takeover proceedings after the bankruptcy of P+S Werften GmbH, Abu Dhabi MAR (ADM) also signaled its interest.

At the beginning of September 2013, a new flame cutting center for the construction of ships for the foreign and German navy was put into operation at the shipyard. There are were an order to build 35–40 meter 30 patrol boats for Saudi Arabia. An export ban was imposed on the patrol boats in November 2018, as a result of which the shipyard had to register short-time work for a large part of the workforce.

=== 2020s ===
At the beginning of November 2020, Lürssen confirmed the delivery of ten coast guard boats to Egypt. The boats were designed for domestic coastal protection tasks. These were, for example, the protection of sensitive offshore installations, the prevention of smuggling, the containment of piracy and sea rescue.

The keel of the Oste-class 424 fleet service vessel was laid in 2025 at Peene shipyard. It is the second of three planned reconnaissance ships for the Bundeswehr. The new vessels are scheduled to replace the current Oste-class fleet service ships starting in 2029.

== Naval ships ==
Naval ships built by Penne-Werft include:

- Kondor-class minesweeper
- Hai-class submarine hunter
- Krake-class mine-warfare vessel
- Jugend-class supply ship
- Ohre-class accommodation ship
- Berlin-class replenishment ship
- Parchim-class corvette
- Baden-Württemberg-class frigate
- Oste-class spy vessel
- Niedersachsen-class frigate stopped in 2026
