= AK-230 =

Soviet fully automatic naval twin 30 mm gun

AK-230 / Type 69
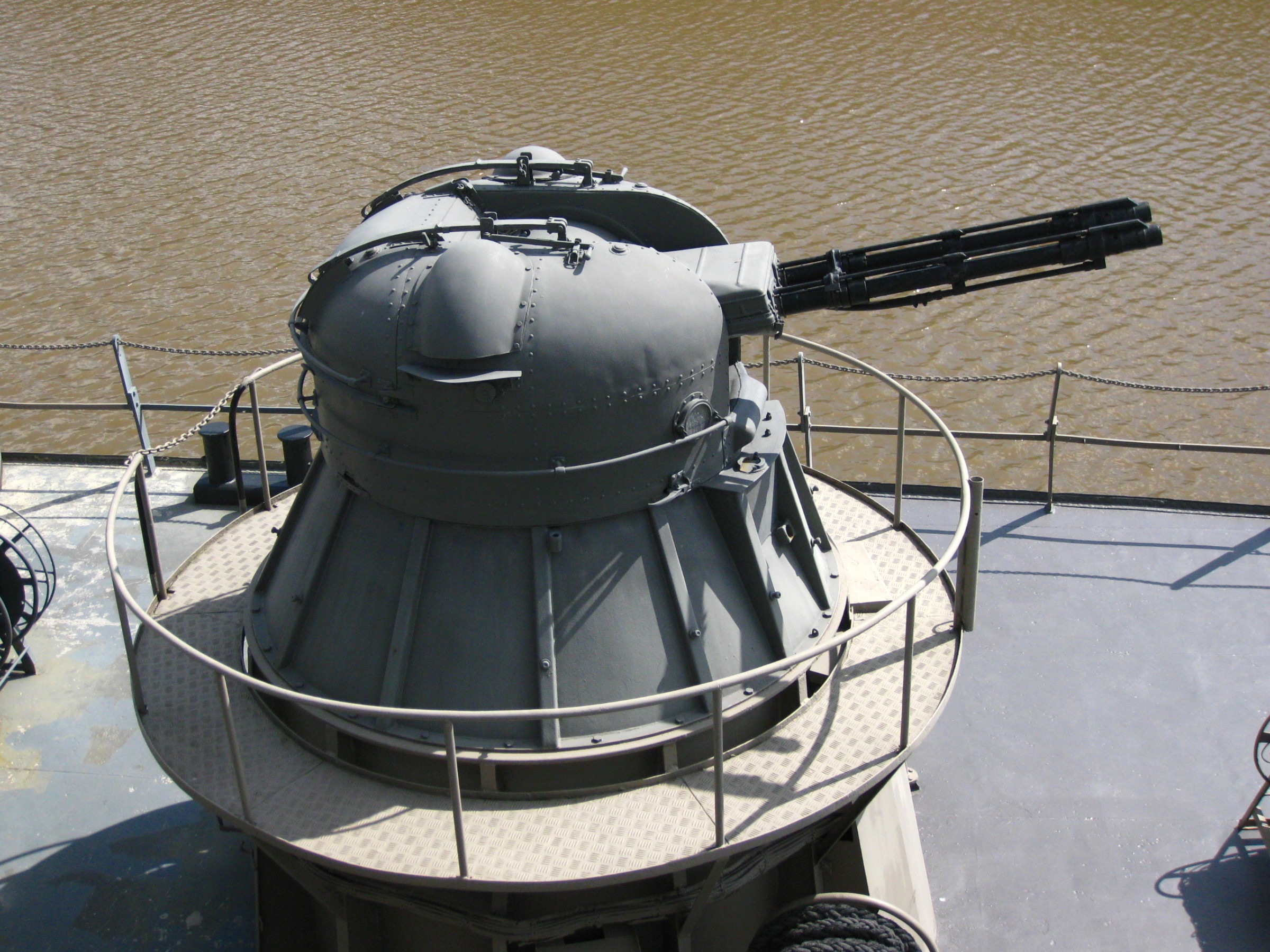
- AK-230 mounted on Finnish minelayer Keihässalmi
- Type: CIWS
- Place of origin: Soviet Union

Service history
- In service: 1969-1990s

Production history
- Designed: 1956
- Manufacturer: Tulamashzavod
- Produced: 1959-1984
- No. built: 1750
- Variants: See Variants

Specifications
- Mass: 156 kg (344 lb) per gun; 1,974 kg (4,352 lb) for full mount
- Length: 2.140 m (7.02 ft)
- Barrel length: 1.897 m (6.22 ft)
- Width: 2.1 m (6.9 ft)
- Height: 1.46 m (4.8 ft)
- Crew: 2 (remote)
- Cartridge: 30x210mmB
- Cartridge weight: 1.07 kg (2.4 lb) to 1.13 kg (2.5 lb)
- Caliber: 30mm
- Barrels: 2
- Action: Gas-operated revolver cannon
- Rate of fire: 1000 rpm (per barrel)
- Muzzle velocity: 1,050 m/s (3,400 ft/s)
- Maximum firing range: 6.5 km (21,000 ft) against surface targets; 4 km (13,000 ft) against aircraft; 2 km (6,600 ft) against missiles
- Feed system: 500-round belt

The AK-230 is a Soviet radar-controlled 30mm naval anti-aircraft autocannon. It is mounted in an enclosed automatic turret and directed by radar. The AK-230 is widely used, mounted on large warships as well as small craft. About 1450 guns were produced in the USSR, and about 300 were produced in China as the Type 69. It was succeeded by the more powerful AK-630 from the mid-to-late 1970s. AK-230 is a close-in weapon system (CIWS).

== Development and service ==
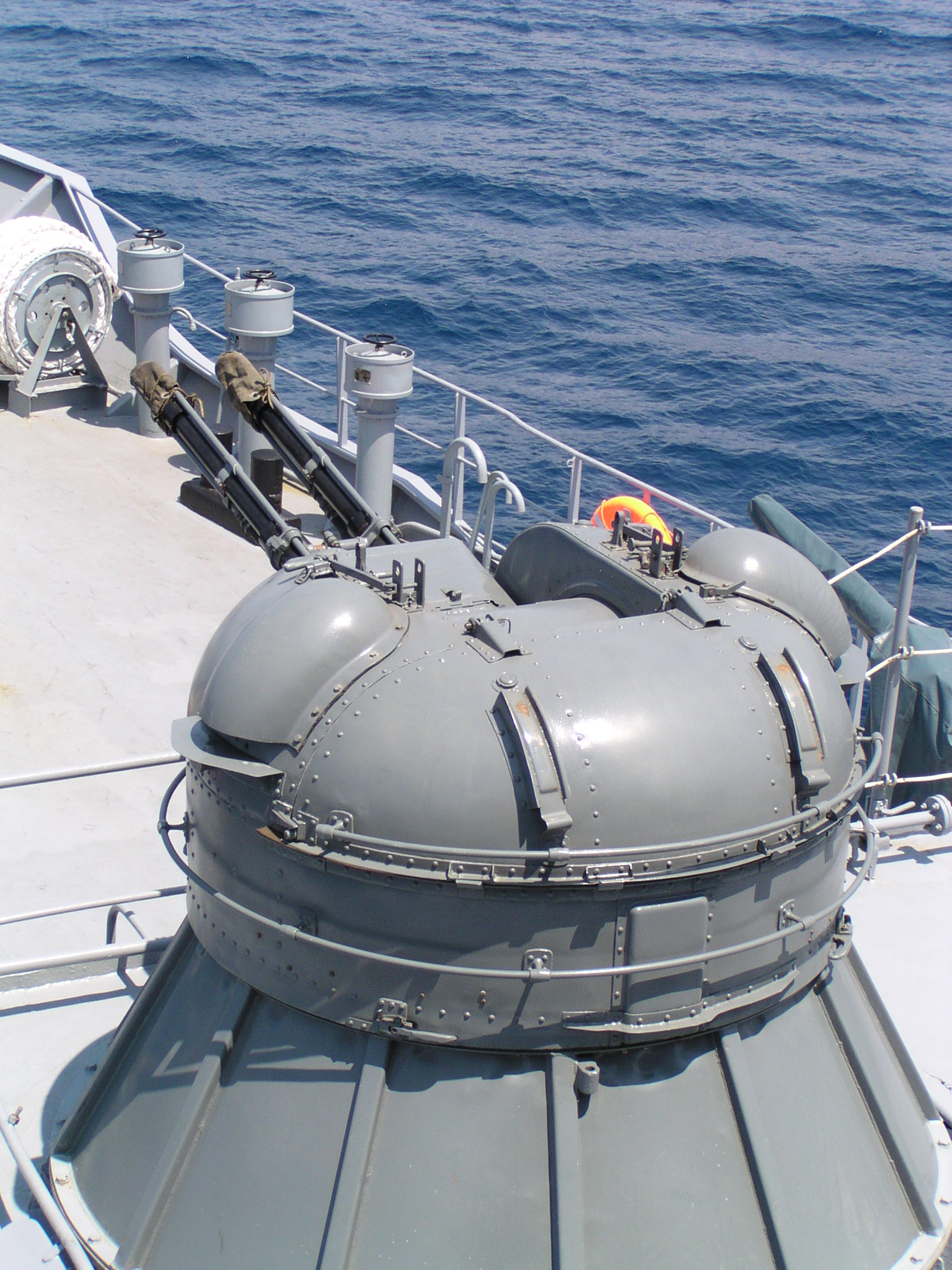
The rear of an AK-230 on the deck of the ORP Wodnik.

Development of the weapon began during the 1950s, with the first trial weapon fitted to the Osa class of fast attack missile boats and Shershen class torpedo boats. The weapon was officially accepted into service in 1969. Its service life was relatively short due to the fielding of the AK-630 system in the mid-1970s, which uses the same mountings and can be controlled by the same fire control systems. While its 30×210 mm round was much more powerful than the AK-630's 30×165 mm one, having the muzzle velocity of 1,050 m/s (3,400 ft/s) (the same as with 30×173 mm GAU-8's cartridge), the moderately powered AK-630's round allowed for much higher rates of fire, especially in a Gatling-type weapon, which was considered more advantageous for the anti-aircraft system.

== Description ==
The weapon consists of two stabilized NN-30 30 mm water-cooled four chamber revolver cannons, which are mounted inside a riveted steel turret. The gun mechanism is gas operated. The guns each weigh 155 kg (342 lb) and have barrels 1,930 mm (76 in) long, and a total length of 2,670 mm (105 in). The barrels are rifled with 12 grooves. The guns each have a rate of fire of 1,000 round per minute; they are fed by independent 500-round belts of ammunition.

The rounds are electrically fired; propellent gases are used to eject the spent shells and belt links into a space between the magazine and the hull. The ballistic maximum range for the weapon is about 6.7 km (4.2 mi), but realistic ranges for engaging air targets are quoted as between 2.5 to 4 km (1.6 to 2.5 mi).

The weapon is remote-directed, typically by a fire-control system linked to either a MR-104 Rys (NATO reporting name: Drum Tilt) or MR-103 Bars (NATO reporting name: Muff Cobb) radar systems.

== Ammunition ==
The AK-230 fires specially developed 30x210B 30 mm ammunition that is electrically primed. Two rounds were developed: a high-explosive round with an impact fuze, and an armour-piercing round. The Chinese Type 69 fires only a locally produced version of the high-explosive round. Ammunition is also produced in Romania and Serbia.

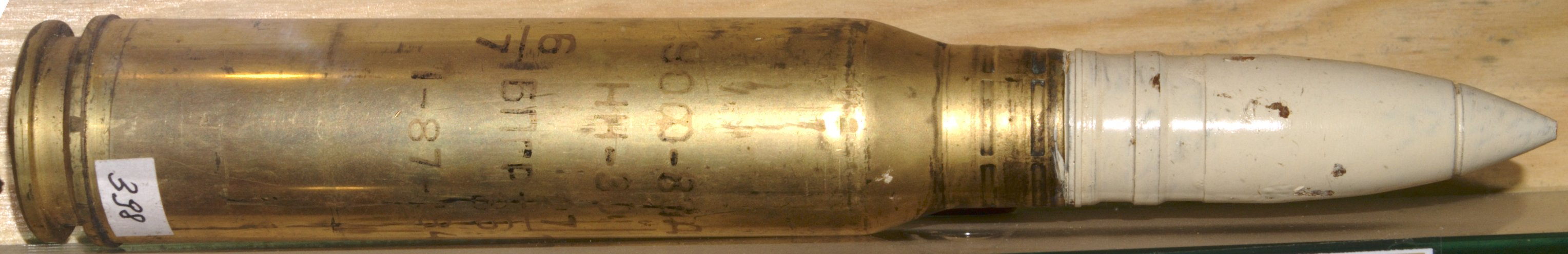
Dummy cartridge

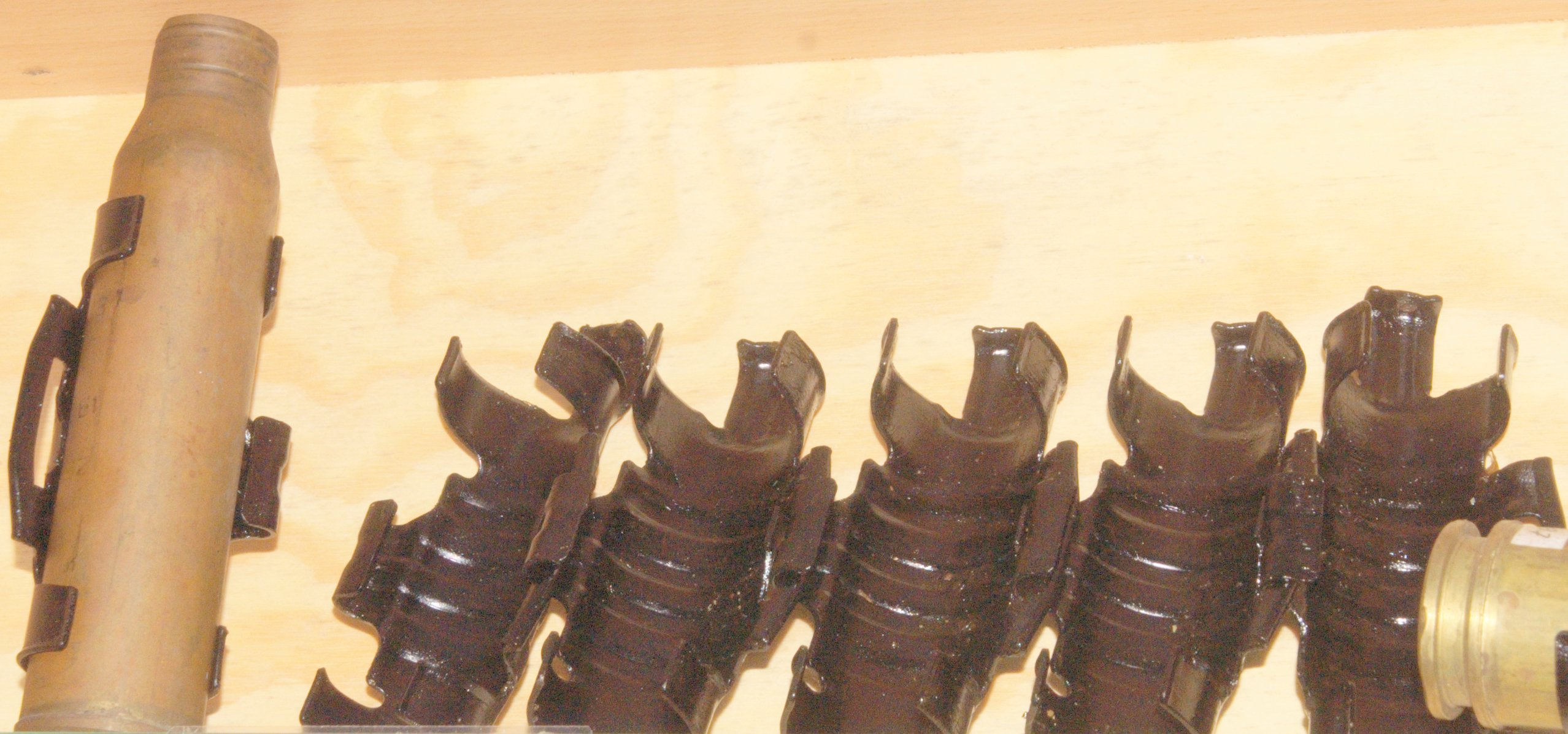

Type	HE	AP-T
Designation	OF-83D	BR-83
Weight
Round	1.13 kg (2.5 lb)	1.12 kg (2.5 lb)
Projectile	0.27 kg (0.60 lb)	0.35 kg (0.77 lb)
Explosive content	30 g (1.1 oz) of A-IX-2	-
Muzzle velocity	1,050 m/s (3,400 ft/s)	

== Specifications ==
- Calibre: 30 mm
- Traverse: +180 to -180 degrees at 35 degree/s
- Elevation: -12 to +87 degrees at 50 degree/s
- Mounting weight: 1,857 to 1,905 kg (4,094 to 4,200 lb)
- Rate of fire: 2,000 rpm (system)
- Gun Weight: 156 kg (344 lb)
- Gun Length oa: 2.140 m (7 ft 0.3 in)
- Bore Length: 1.897 m (6 ft 2.7 in)
- Rifling Length: 1.805 m (5 ft 11.1 in)
- Grooves: 12
- Chamber Volume: 221.1 cm^{3} (13.49 cu in)
- Rate Of Fire: over 1,000 rounds per minute cyclic

== Variants ==
- AK-230 A type - For ships with 220 V DC power systems.
- AK-230 B type - For ships with 380 V AC power systems.
- AK-230M - Less magnetized version for minesweepers (380 V AC).
- Type 69 - Chinese upgraded version, total weight 3,600 kg. Shells are ejected outside of the turret. a faster 50 degree/second traverse.

== Platforms ==
=== AK-230 ===
- Soviet cruiser Mikhail Kutuzov - 8 mounts
- Polnocny-class landing ship - 2 or 4 mounts
- Project 133.1 corvette - 1 mount
- Soviet cruiser Admiral Senyavin - 8 mounts (after 1972 modernization)
- Project 57bis - 4 mounts (after modernization)
- Project 56 - 4 mounts (after modernization)
- Project 205 Moskit - 2 mounts
- Project 205P Tarantul - 2 mounts
- Project 206 Shtorm - 2 mounts
- Project 1159 Del'fin - 2 mounts
- Project 12321 Dzheyran - 2 mounts

=== AK-230M ===
- Project 257 - 1 mount
- Project 266 Rubin - 2 mounts
- Project 266M Akvamarin - 2 mounts
