= Military Sealift Command (Indonesia) =

Indonesian Military Sealift Command

- Komando Lintas Laut Militer
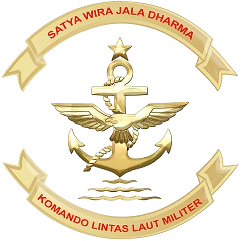
- Insignia of the Military Sealift Command
- Founded: 1 July 1961; 64 years ago
- Country: Indonesia
- Allegiance: President of Indonesia
- Branch: Indonesian Navy
- Type: Naval Support Fleet
- Role: Sealift; Ocean transportation
- Part of: Indonesian National Armed Forces
- Garrison/HQ: North Jakarta
- Nickname: Kolinlamil
- Mottos: Satya Wira Jala Dharma (Faithful Warriors Devoted to the Sea)
- Engagements: Operation Trikora; MV Sinar Kudus hijacking
- Website: https://kolinlamil.tnial.mil.id/

Commanders
- Commander: Rear Admiral Hudiarto Krisno Utomo
- Chief of Staff: Rear Admiral Lower Half Mochammad Riza

The Indonesia Military Sealift Command (Indonesian: Komando Lintas Laut Militer, abbr.: Kolinlamil), is an organization that controls the replenishment and military transport ships of the Indonesian Navy. Military Sealift Command has the responsibility for providing sealift and ocean transportation for all Indonesian military services as well as for other government agencies. It first came into existence on 1 July 1961 when the Naval Transport Department (Djawatan Angkutan Laut Militer / Dalmil) was established as the sole service responsible for the Ministry of Defense's ocean transport requirements for both peacetime and war.

== History ==
Military Sealift Command was formed in Jakarta on 1 July 1961 under the name of the Naval Transport Department (Djawatan Angkutan Laut Militer / Dalmil) using for heavy amphibious transport purposes the Navy's newly acquired Teluk Langsa-class LSTs from the US and one Polnocny-class LST, manufactured in Poland for the service. The establishment of the Dalmil was based on considerations for the logistical interests of the Navy and the Indonesian National Armed Forces in general, including the interests of the government in the field of marine transportation.

Dalmil was renamed into the Naval Transport Command (Komando Angkutan Laut Militer / Koalmil) while it served its first combat duty: Operation Trikora in April 1962.

On 27 February 1970, the name was renamed into the Naval Transport Service (Dinas Angkutan Laut Militer / Disanglamil) in February 1970. Later that year on 4 May, it was renamend again to Military Sealift Command (Komando Lintas Laut Militer / Kolinlamil).

Starting 23 July 1971, the name of the Military Sealift Command used and confirmed as the official title based on the resolution of the office of the Minister of Defense and Security/Commander of the Armed Forces, concerning Organizational Principles and the needs of the ALRI.

In 1985, the Military Sealift Command was organized into two Sealift Forces when the National Fleet Command, upon which it supported for 24 years, was split into the Western and Eastern Fleets.

== Area Commands ==
Military Sealift Command has the main task of fostering the capability of the Military Sea Transportation system, fostering the potential of national sea transportation for the benefit of national defense, carrying out sea transportation of the National Armed Forces and National Police which includes personnel, equipment and supplies, both administrative and strategic tactical and carrying out sea transportation assistance in order to support national development.

In accordance with the functions and duties of carrying out a shift in military strength, both troops and logistics by sea in all Indonesian waters. Sea crossing activities by Military Sealift Command elements as well as elements under the Operational Control of Military Sealift Command can be carried out individually or in formation both in times of peace and war. Shifting troops and logistics can be done from a Naval Base, Public Port, Coast to Naval Base or to a Public Port and other beaches.

=== Development ===
In the field of development, Military Sealift Command is tasked with compiling and planning programs for the development of elemental strength, terminals and supporting facilities and infrastructure within the ranks of the command through maintenance, delivery, tactical development and procedures for Military Sea Transportation in accordance with the level and environment of its authority

=== Program ===
In the operational field, Military Sealift Command coordinates and prepares plans and programs for sea transportation for all ranks of the National Armed Forces and National Police. As a Principal Command carrying out operational duties, the Military Sealift Command operates several ships of various types, including: Tank Landing Ship, General Support, Personnel Transport Assistance and Landing Platform Dock types.

Besides the Navy facilities, it includes the management of two Military Sealift Command terminals, as an element of the Executing Command or Anglanas responsible for the three Executive Commands:

- Military Sealift Force Jakarta
- Military Sealift Force Surabaya
- Military Sealift Force Makassar

== Fleet ==
Military Sealift Command operates several types of Landing Ship Tank (LST) elements based in naval bases in Jakarta, Surabaya, and Makassar. These bases form the basis of the Military Sealift Command's Sealift Forces, which correspond to the three Naval Fleet Commands.

=== Military Sealift Force Jakarta ===
- KRI Teluk Amboina (503)
- KRI Teluk Manado (537)
- KRI Teluk Hading (538)
- KRI Banda Aceh (593)
- KRI Teluk Mentawai
- KRI Tanjung Kambani (971)
- KRI Tanjung Nusanive (973)

=== Military Sealift Force Surabaya ===
- KRI Teluk Ratai (509)
- KRI Teluk Bone (511)
- KRI Teluk Parigi (539)
- KRI Teluk Lampung (540)
- KRI Banjarmasin (592)
- KRI Teluk Bintuni (520)

=== Military Sealift Force Makassar ===
- KRI Teluk Lada (521)
- KRI Nuku (373)
- KRI Sorong (911)
- KRI Rencong (622)

== Commander ==
Commanders of the Military Sealift Command are known as Panglima Komando Lintas Laut Militer / PANGKOLINLAMIL and are appointed by and relieved by the Chief of Staff of the Navy.

== See also ==
- Indonesian Navy
