= Irwan Achmadi =

Indonesian admiral

Rear Admiral Irwan Achmadi
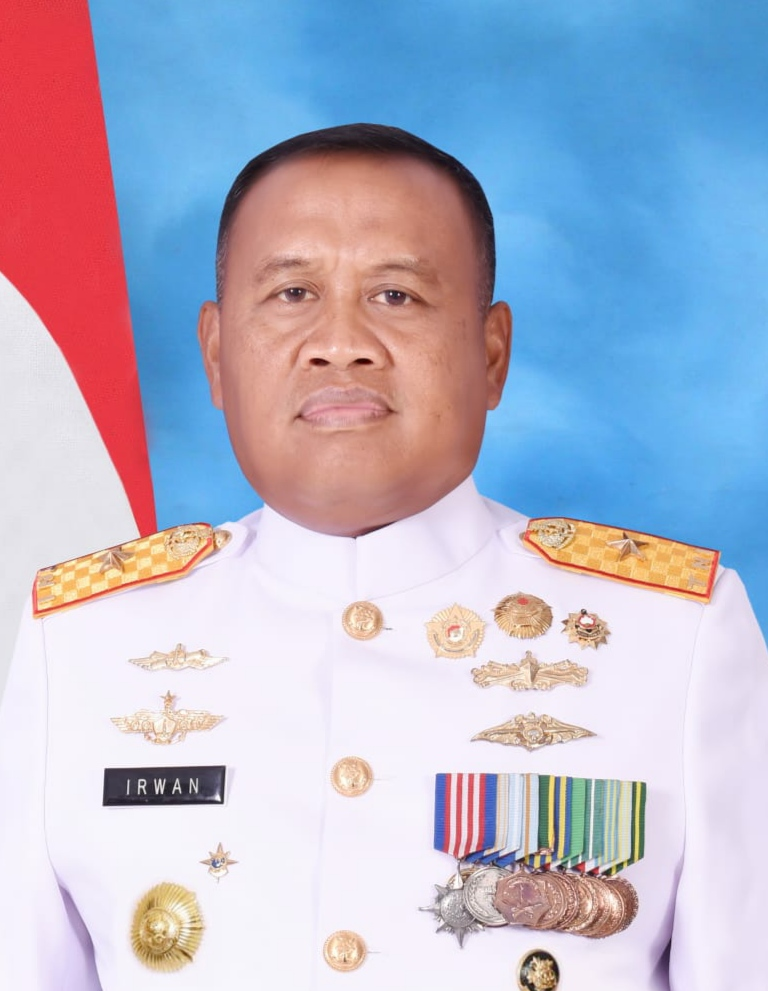
- Born: Majalengka, West Java, Indonesia
- Military career
- Allegiance: Indonesia
- Branch: Indonesian Navy
- Service years: 1988-present
- Rank: Rear Admiral
- Commands: Senior Officer of Indonesian Navy
- Awards: See Awards

Rear Admiral Irwan Achmadi is a rear admiral in the Indonesian Navy who served as a Senior Officer (Indonesian: Perwira Tinggi) who since 18 November 2020, has carried out the mandate as Aspers Kasal. The last position of this two-star general was Commander of the Military Seaborne Command.

== Career ==
He graduated from the Naval Academy in 1988. He has served various assignments both on warships and on staff.

His education and training later included Dikpespa, Seskoal, Sesko TNI (2013) and Lemhanas.

On 13 November 2017, the position of the Commander of the Eastern Fleet (Pangarmatim) has changed. Rear Admiral (Laksda) Darwanto, who was serving as Pangarmatim, have been replaced by Admiral Didik Setiyono. Ahead of the change of command, Armatim held an exit briefing at the Panti Tjahaja Timur Koarmatim Ujung Surabaya building. In this activity, Admiral Darwanto expressed his gratitude to all officers in the ranks of Armatim who sincerely and worked hard to help him as Pangarmatim by carrying out their duties.

== Position ==
- KRI Mongisidi Satkor
- Communication Division Officer
- Maritime Weapons Division Officer
- Head of KRI Teluk Sibolga Depsops
- Implementing Officer of KRI Teluk Sibolga
- Implementing Officer of KRI Teluk Sabang
- Commander of KRI Teluk Sabang (2001–2002)
- Danlanal Tarempa (2002)
- Head of Sub-Directorate of Ditjiansta Ops Seskoal
- Head of Subdiscomlekal
- Dansatlinlamil Surabaya
- Koarmatim Amphibious Ship Dansat
- Lecturer at Sesko TNI
- Asrena Pangkoarmabar
- Naval Academy Planning and Development Director
- Dirdok Kodiklatal
- Kaskolinlamil (2017–2019)
- Dankodikopsla (2019–2020)
- Pankolinlamil (2020)
- Kasal Aspers (2020–)

== See also ==
- Indonesian military ranks
