= KRI Teluk Jakarta =

Frosch-class landing ship

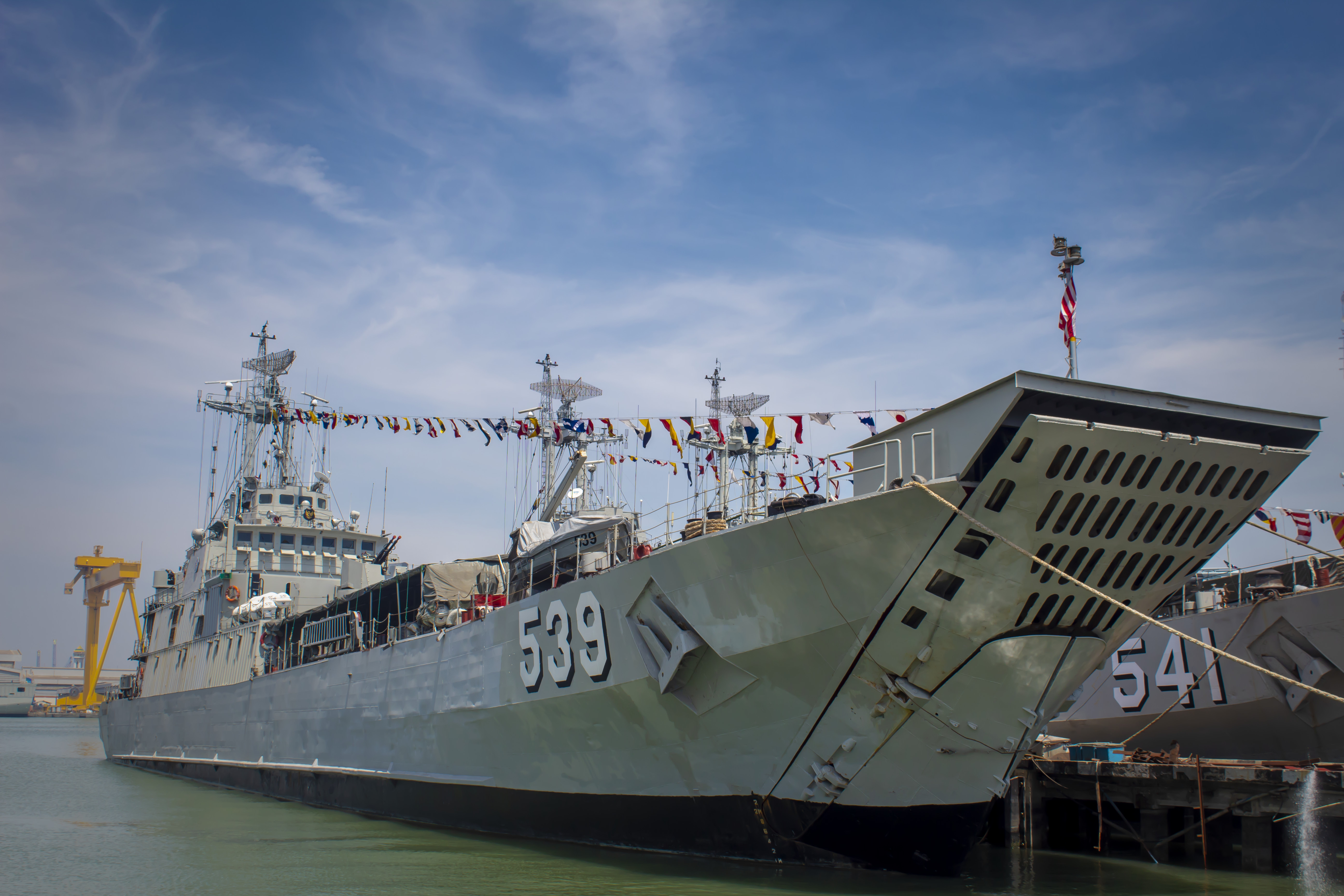
- KRI Teluk Jakarta (background) and KRI Teluk Parigi (foreground) at Surabaya in 2018

History

East Germany
- Name: Eisenhüttenstadt
- Namesake: Eisenhüttenstadt
- Builder: VEB Peenewerft, Wolgast
- Yard number: 341
- Laid down: 18 August 1977
- Launched: 8 March 1978
- Commissioned: 4 January 1979
- Decommissioned: 2 October 1990
- Stricken: 1 October 1990
- Identification: Pennant number: 615
- Fate: Sold to Indonesia 1993

Indonesia
- Name: Teluk Jakarta
- Namesake: Jakarta Bay
- Acquired: 25 August 1993
- Commissioned: 19 September 1994
- Out of service: 14 July 2020
- Identification: Pennant number: 541
- Fate: Sunk due to leakage, 14 July 2020

General characteristics
- Class & type: Frosch-class landing ship
- Displacement: 1,950 long tons (1,980 t)
- Length: 98 m (321 ft 6 in)
- Beam: 11.1 m (36 ft 5 in)
- Draught: 2.8 m (9.2 ft)
- Installed power: 5,000 hp (3.7 MW)
- Propulsion: 2 x diesel engines; 2 x shafts
- Speed: 18 knots (33 km/h; 21 mph)
- Capacity: 11 amphibious tanks or 400–600 tons cargo
- Troops: 1 company of marines
- Complement: 46
- Sensors & processing systems: TSR-333 I-band navigation radar; MR-302 Strut Curve F-band air/surface radar
- Electronic warfare & decoys: 2 x PK-16 chaff launchers
- Armament: 1 × single Bofors 40 mm L/60 gun; 1 × twin V-11 37 mm L/63 guns; 2 × twin 2M-3 25 mm guns

KRI Teluk Jakarta (541) was a Frosch-class landing ship operated the Indonesian Navy. The ship was former Eisenhüttenstadt (615) of the Volksmarine.

== Characteristics ==
KRI Teluk Jakarta is a Project 108 (NATO reporting name: Frosch I) regular medium landing ship.

Teluk Jakarta has a length of 98 m (322 ft), a beam of 11.1 m (36 ft), with a draught of 2.8 m (9.2 ft) and her displacement is 1,950 long tons (1,980 t) at full load. The ship is powered by two diesel engines, with total power output of 5,000 metric horsepower (3.7 MW) distributed in two shaft.

She has a speed of 18 knots (33 km/h) and complement of 46 personnel. The ship has cargo capacity of 600 long tons (610 t).

As Eisenhüttenstadt, she was initially armed with two АК-725 twin 57 mm guns, two AK-230 twin barrel 30 mm guns and equipped with Muff Cob fire control radar. She may have been equipped with two 40-tube 122 mm rocket launchers. As Teluk Jakarta, the ship are rearmed with one single Bofors 40 mm L/60 gun, one twin V-11 37 mm L/63 guns, and two twin 2М-3 25 mm autocannons.

== Service history ==
Eisenhüttenstadt was built by VEB Peenewerft, Wolgast. The ship was laid down on 18 August 1977, launched on 8 March 1978 and was commissioned to Volksmarine on 4 January 1979. Following the reunification of Germany, Eisenhüttenstadt was deleted on 1 October 1990 and was formally decommissioned from Volksmarine on 2 October. The unified German Navy didn't take over the ship and she was laid up with her pennant number painted over at Peenemünde Naval Base, awaiting her disposal as scrap metal.

Indonesian Navy acquired the ship on 25 August 1993 as part of warship procurement program headed by the then State Minister for Research and Technology, B. J. Habibie, as the Coordinator of the Procurement Team. The procurement program was based on the Presidential Instruction No. 3/1992 issued by President Suharto on 3 September 1992 which aimed to bolster the Navy capabilities. Prior to sailing for Indonesia, she was refitted and demilitarized in Germany. The ship arrived in Indonesia in 1994 and she was commissioned as KRI Teluk Jakarta (541) on 19 September 1994.

Teluk Jakarta was sunk due to leakage after being hit by high waves on 14 July 2020 at 09:00 UTC+7 in the waters northeast of Kangean Island. She sank at the depth of 90 meters while carrying logistics bound for eastern Indonesia. The waves in the area were rising up from 2.5 to 4 meters high. All 55 crew members survived the sinking. 54 were rescued by KM Tanto Sejahtera and the last one by KM Dobonsolo. They were then transferred to KRI Raden Eddy Martadinata. According to the Head of the Navy Information Service, Rear Admiral M. Zaenal, at the time of the sinking, the ship was seaworthy and was routinely maintained.

== Bibliography ==
- Ehlers, Hartmut (1991). "The Naval Facilities at Peenemünde After the German Unification". Warship International. 28 (3). International Naval Research Organization: 227–239.
- Gardiner, Robert; Chumbley, Stephen, eds. (1995). Conway's All the World's Fighting Ships 1947–1995. Annapolis, Maryland, USA: Naval Institute Press. ISBN 1-55750-132-7.
- Moore, Capt. John (1984). Jane's Fighting Ships 1984-85. Jane's Information Group. ISBN 978-0710607959.
- Saunders, Stephen, ed. (2009). Jane's Fighting Ships 2009-2010. Jane's Information Group. ISBN 9780710628886.
