= KRI Teluk Parigi =

KRI Teluk Parigi is the name of the following ships of the Indonesian Navy:

- KRI Teluk Parigi (1965), a Polnocny-class landing ship, stricken in 1974
- KRI Teluk Parigi (539), a Teluk Gilimanuk-class landing ship (originally the German Frosch-class landing ship), launched in 1977, sold to Indonesia in 1993, in service since 1995
