= KRI Teluk Cirebon =

Frosch-class landing ship

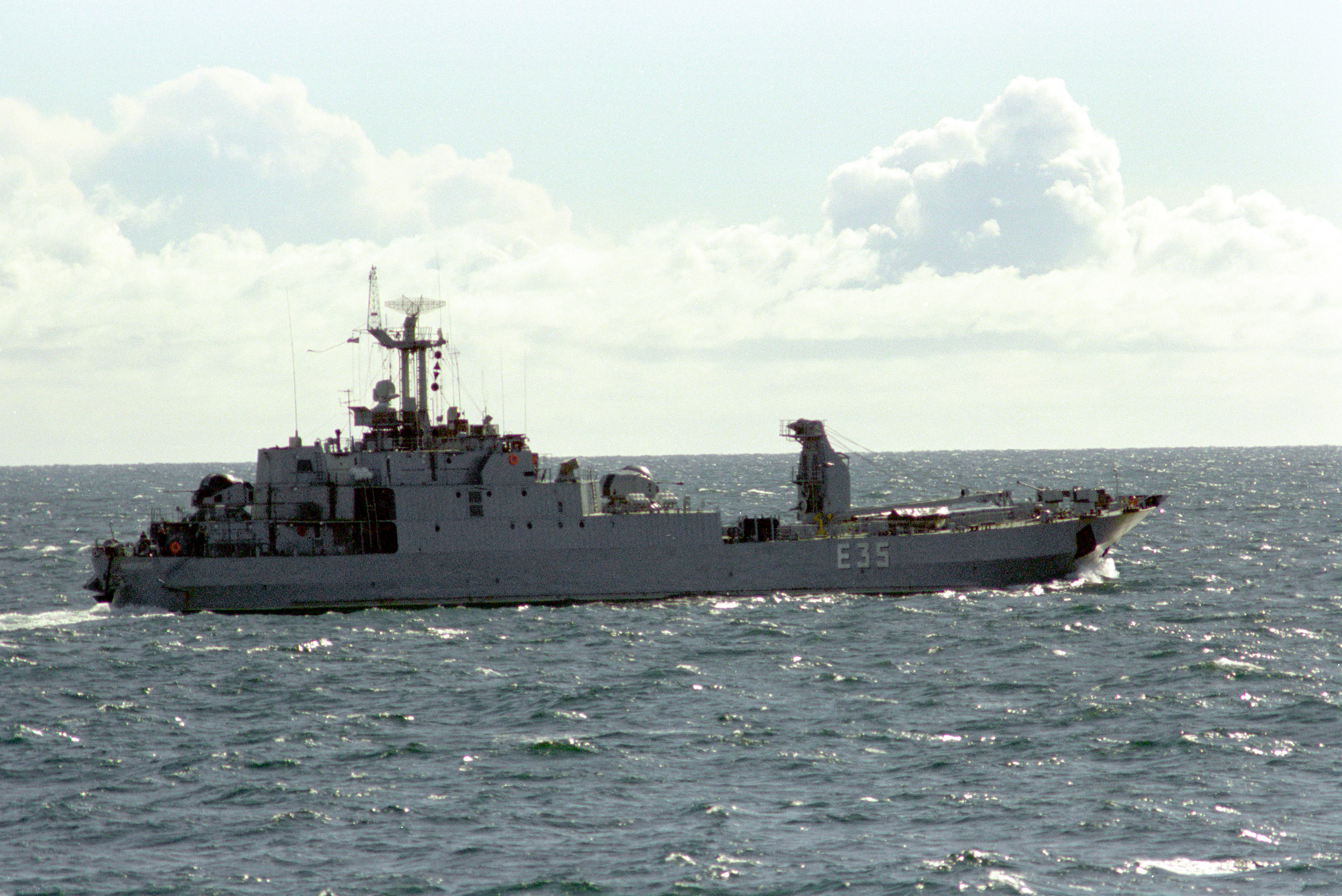
- Nordperd while observing NATO ships in 1986

History

East Germany
- Name: Nordperd
- Namesake: Nordperd
- Builder: VEB Peenewerft, Wolgast
- Laid down: 26 January 1978
- Launched: 30 August 1978
- Commissioned: 3 October 1979
- Decommissioned: 2 October 1990
- Stricken: 1 October 1990
- Identification: Pennant number: E 35, E 171
- Fate: Sold to Indonesia 1993

Indonesia
- Name: Teluk Cirebon
- Namesake: Cirebon Bay
- Acquired: 25 August 1993
- Commissioned: 25 April 1995
- Identification: Pennant number: 543
- Status: Active

General characteristics
- Class & type: Frosch II-class amphibious logistic ship
- Displacement: 1,700 long tons (1,700 t)
- Length: 90.7 m (297 ft 7 in)
- Beam: 11.1 m (36 ft 5 in)
- Draught: 2.8 m (9.2 ft)
- Installed power: 4,408 hp (3.242 MW)
- Propulsion: 2 x diesel engines; 2 x shafts
- Speed: 18 knots (33 km/h; 21 mph)
- Capacity: 11 amphibious tanks or 400–600 tons cargo
- Troops: 1 company of marines
- Complement: 46
- Sensors & processing systems: TSR-333 I-band navigation radar; MR-302 Strut Curve F-band air/surface radar
- Electronic warfare & decoys: 2 x PK-16 chaff launchers
- Armament: 2 × twin V-11 37 mm L/63 guns; 2 × twin 2M-3 25 mm guns

KRI Teluk Cirebon (543) is a Frosch II-class amphibious logistic ship operated the Indonesian Navy. The ship was former Nordperd (E 35 / E 171) of the Volksmarine.

== Characteristics ==
KRI Teluk Cirebon is a Project 109 (NATO reporting name: Frosch II) amphibious logistic support ship.

Teluk Cirebon has a length of 90.7 m (298 ft), a beam of 11.1 m (36 ft), with a draught of 2.8 m (9.2 ft) and her displacement is 1,700 long tons (1,700 t) at full load. The ship is powered by two diesel engines, with total power output of 4,408 metric horsepower (3.242 MW) distributed in two shaft.

She has a speed of 18 knots (33 km/h) and complement of 46 personnel. The ship has 650 long tons (660 t) of cargo capacity and also equipped with a 5-tons crane in amidships.

As Nordperd, she was initially armed with two АК-725 twin 57 mm guns, two 2М-3 twin 25 mm autocannons and equipped with Muff Cob fire control radar. As Teluk Cirebon, the ship are rearmed with two twin V-11 37 mm L/63 guns and two twin 2М-3 25 mm autocannons.

== Service history ==
Nordperd was built by VEB Peenewerft, Wolgast. The ship was laid down on 26 January 1978, launched on 30 August 1978 and was commissioned to Volksmarine on 3 October 1979. Following the reunification of Germany, Nordperd was deleted on 1 October 1990 and was formally decommissioned from Volksmarine on 2 October. The unified German Navy didn't take over the ship and she was laid up at Peenemünde Naval Base. While being laid up, she received routine maintenance such as bilges inspection, heating in important areas, and routine propeller shaft inspection.

Indonesian Navy acquired the ship on 25 August 1993 as part of warship procurement program headed by the then State Minister for Research and Technology, B. J. Habibie, as the Coordinator of the Procurement Team. The procurement program was based on the Presidential Instruction No. 3/1992 issued by President Suharto on 3 September 1992 which aimed to bolster the Navy capabilities. Prior to sailing for Indonesia, she was refitted and demilitarized in Rostock. She was commissioned as KRI Teluk Cirebon (543) on 25 April 1995.

== Bibliography ==
- Gardiner, Robert; Chumbley, Stephen, eds. (1995). Conway's All the World's Fighting Ships 1947–1995. Annapolis, Maryland, USA: Naval Institute Press. ISBN 1-55750-132-7.
- Moore, Capt. John (1984). Jane's Fighting Ships 1984-85. Jane's Information Group. ISBN 978-0710607959.
- Saunders, Stephen, ed. (2009). Jane's Fighting Ships 2009-2010. Jane's Information Group. ISBN 9780710628886.
- Ehlers, Hartmut (1991). "The Naval Facilities at Peenemünde After the German Unification". Warship International. 28 (3). International Naval Research Organization: 227–239.
