= KRI Teluk Manado =

KRI Teluk Manado is the name of the following ships of the Indonesian Navy:

- KRI Teluk Manado (505), a LST-542-class tank landing ship, originally USS LST-657, transferred to Indonesia in 1961, decommissioned in 1983
- KRI Teluk Manado (537), a Teluk Gilimanuk-class landing ship (originally the German Frosch-class landing ship), launched in 1977, sold to Indonesia in 1993, in service since 1995
