= KRI Teluk Peleng =

Frosch-class landing ship

History

East Germany
- Name: Lübben
- Namesake: Lübben
- Builder: VEB Peenewerft, Wolgast
- Yard number: 335
- Laid down: 11 December 1975
- Launched: 2 October 1976
- Commissioned: 15 March 1978
- Decommissioned: 2 October 1990
- Stricken: 1 October 1990
- Identification: Pennant number: 631, 632
- Fate: Sold to Indonesia 1993

Indonesia
- Name: Teluk Peleng
- Namesake: Peleng Bay, Banggai Islands Regency
- Acquired: 25 August 1993
- Commissioned: 23 September 1993
- Identification: Pennant number: 535
- Fate: Capsized due to leakage, November 2013

General characteristics
- Class & type: Frosch-class landing ship
- Displacement: 1,950 long tons (1,980 t)
- Length: 98 m (321 ft 6 in)
- Beam: 11.1 m (36 ft 5 in)
- Draught: 2.8 m (9.2 ft)
- Installed power: 5,000 hp (3.7 MW)
- Propulsion: 2 × diesel engines; 2 × shafts
- Speed: 18 knots (33 km/h; 21 mph)
- Capacity: 11 amphibious tanks or 400–600 tons cargo
- Troops: 1 company of marines
- Complement: 46
- Sensors & processing systems: TSR-333 I-band navigation radar; MR-302 Strut Curve F-band air/surface radar
- Electronic warfare & decoys: 2 × PK-16 chaff launchers
- Armament: 1 × single Bofors 40 mm L/60 gun; 1 × twin V-11 37 mm L/63 guns; 2 × twin 2M-3 25 mm guns

KRI Teluk Peleng (535) was a Frosch-class landing ship operated the Indonesian Navy. The ship was former Lübben (631 / 632) of the Volksmarine.

== Characteristics ==
KRI Teluk Peleng was a Project 108 (NATO reporting name: Frosch I) regular medium landing ship.

Teluk Peleng has a length of 98 m (322 ft), a beam of 11.1 m (36 ft), with a draught of 2.8 m (9.2 ft) and her displacement is 1,950 long tons (1,980 t) at full load. The ship is powered by two diesel engines, with total power output of 5,000 metric horsepower (3.7 MW) distributed in two shaft.

She has a speed of 18 knots (33 km/h) and complement of 46 personnel. The ship has cargo capacity of 600 long tons (610 t).

As Lübben, she was initially armed with two АК-725 twin 57 mm guns, two AK-230 twin barrel 30 mm guns and equipped with Muff Cob fire control radar. She may have been equipped with two 40-tube 122 mm rocket launchers. As Teluk Peleng, the ship are rearmed with one single Bofors 40 mm L/60 gun, one twin V-11 37 mm L/63 guns, and two twin 2М-3 25 mm autocannons.

== Service history ==
Lübben was built by VEB Peenewerft, Wolgast. The ship was laid down on 11 December 1975, launched on 2 October 1976 and was commissioned to Volksmarine on 15 March 1978. Following the reunification of Germany, Lübben was deleted on 1 October 1990 and was formally decommissioned from Volksmarine on 2 October. The unified German Navy didn't take over the ship and she was laid up with her pennant number painted over at Peenemünde Naval Base, awaiting her disposal as scrap metal.

Indonesian Navy acquired the ship on 25 August 1993 as part of warship procurement program headed by the then State Minister for Research and Technology, B. J. Habibie, as the Coordinator of the Procurement Team. The procurement program was based on the Presidential Instruction No. 3/1992 issued by President Suharto on 3 September 1992 which aimed to bolster the Navy capabilities. Prior to sailing for Indonesia, she was refitted and demilitarized in Germany. The ship arrived in Indonesia in late 1993 and she was commissioned as KRI Teluk Peleng (535) on 23 September 1993.

Teluk Peleng capsized and rested at 90 degrees list due to hull leaks after hitting concrete bollard while moored at Pondok Dayung, Tanjung Priok on 20 November 2013.

== Bibliography ==
- Ehlers, Hartmut (1991). "The Naval Facilities at Peenemünde After the German Unification". Warship International. 28 (3). International Naval Research Organization: 227–239.
- Gardiner, Robert; Chumbley, Stephen, eds. (1995). Conway's All the World's Fighting Ships 1947–1995. Annapolis, Maryland, USA: Naval Institute Press. ISBN 1-55750-132-7.
- Moore, Capt. John (1984). Jane's Fighting Ships 1984-85. Jane's Information Group. ISBN 978-0710607959.
- Saunders, Stephen, ed. (2009). Jane's Fighting Ships 2009-2010. Jane's Information Group. ISBN 9780710628886.
