= KRI Teluk Hading =

Frosch-class landing ship

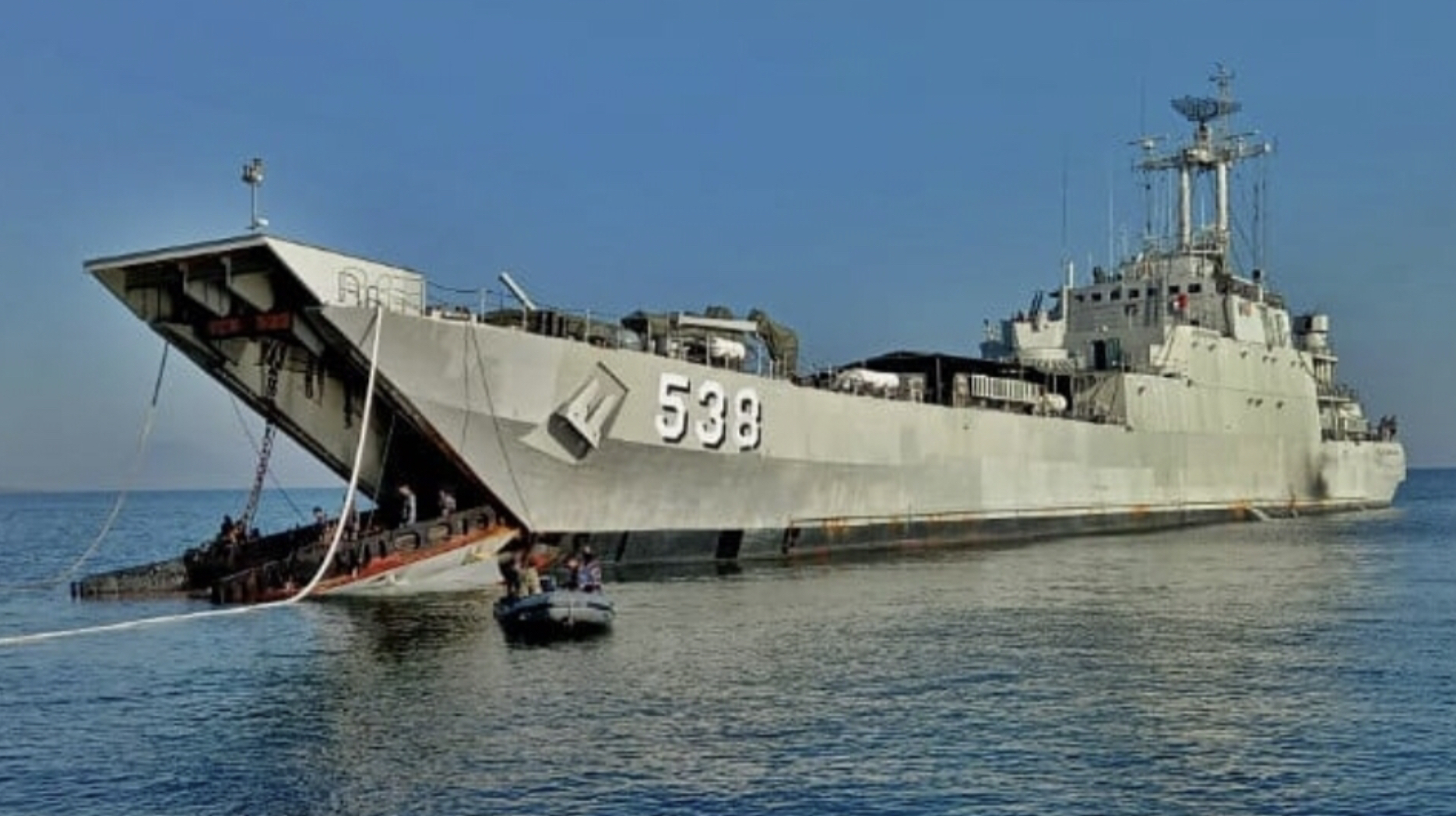
- KRI Teluk Hading

History

East Germany
- Name: Cottbus
- Namesake: Cottbus
- Builder: VEB Peenewerft, Wolgast
- Yard number: 338
- Laid down: 22 November 1976
- Launched: 10 June 1977
- Commissioned: 26 May 1978
- Decommissioned: 2 October 1990
- Stricken: 1 October 1990
- Identification: Pennant number: 634, 614
- Fate: Sold to Indonesia 1993

Indonesia
- Name: Teluk Hading
- Namesake: Hading Bay, East Flores Regency
- Acquired: 25 August 1993
- Commissioned: 12 July 1994
- Decommissioned: 31 October 2024
- Identification: Pennant number: 538
- Motto: Bramantya Lan Mada Ing Arnawa; (Javanese: Fervorous and Courageous at Ocean)
- Fate: Sunk as target, 23 April 2026

General characteristics
- Class & type: Frosch-class landing ship
- Displacement: 1,950 long tons (1,980 t)
- Length: 98 m (321 ft 6 in)
- Beam: 11.1 m (36 ft 5 in)
- Draught: 2.8 m (9.2 ft)
- Installed power: 5,000 hp (3.7 MW)
- Propulsion: 2 x diesel engines; 2 x shafts
- Speed: 18 knots (33 km/h; 21 mph)
- Capacity: 11 amphibious tanks or 400–600 tons cargo
- Troops: 1 company of marines
- Complement: 46
- Sensors & processing systems: TSR-333 I-band navigation radar; MR-302 Strut Curve F-band air/surface radar
- Electronic warfare & decoys: 2 x PK-16 chaff launchers
- Armament: 1 × single Bofors 40 mm L/60 gun; 1 × twin V-11 37 mm L/63 guns; 2 × twin 2M-3 25 mm guns

KRI Teluk Hading (538) was a Frosch-class landing ship operated the Indonesian Navy. The ship was former Cottbus (634 / 614) of the Volksmarine.

== Characteristics ==
KRI Teluk Hading is a Project 108 (NATO reporting name: Frosch I) regular medium landing ship.

Teluk Hading has a length of 98 m (322 ft), a beam of 11.1 m (36 ft), with a draught of 2.8 m (9.2 ft) and her displacement is 1,950 long tons (1,980 t) at full load. The ship is powered by two diesel engines, with total power output of 5,000 metric horsepower (3.7 MW) distributed in two shaft.

She has a speed of 18 knots (33 km/h) and complement of 46 personnel. The ship has cargo capacity of 600 long tons (610 t).

As Cottbus, she was initially armed with two АК-725 twin 57 mm guns, two AK-230 twin barrel 30 mm guns and equipped with MR-103 Bars fire control radar. She may have been equipped with two 40-tube 122 mm rocket launchers. As Teluk Hading, the ship are rearmed with one single Bofors 40 mm L/60 gun, one twin V-11 37 mm L/63 guns, and two twin 2М-3 25 mm autocannons.

== Service history ==
Cottbus was built by VEB Peenewerft, Wolgast. The ship was laid down on 22 November 1976, launched on 10 June 1977 and was commissioned to Volksmarine on 26 May 1978. Following the reunification of Germany, Cottbus was deleted on 1 October 1990 and was formally decommissioned from Volksmarine on 2 October. The unified German Navy didn't take over the ship and she was laid up with her pennant number painted over at Peenemünde Naval Base, awaiting her disposal as scrap metal.

Indonesian Navy acquired the ship on 25 August 1993 as part of warship procurement program headed by the then State Minister for Research and Technology, B. J. Habibie, as the Coordinator of the Procurement Team. The procurement program was based on the Presidential Instruction No. 3/1992 issued by President Suharto on 3 September 1992 which aimed to bolster the Navy capabilities. Prior to sailing for Indonesia, she was refitted and demilitarized in Germany. The ship arrived in Indonesia in 1994 and she was commissioned as KRI Teluk Hading (538) on 12 July 1994.

On 3 June 2023, the ship caught fire in the waters of Selayar Islands, South Sulawesi. All 117 crew members evacuated with no fatalities, and the ship was towed. Teluk Hading was decommissioned on 31 October 2024 at Makassar naval base.

The Makassar naval base held a farewell ceremony for the ship on 16 April 2026, as the ship was planned to be used as target in the 2026 naval joint exercise. The former Teluk Hading was towed by tug KRI Leuser to open ocean for the exercise. The ship sank off Karimunjawa Islands on 23 April after being struck by Exocet missile fired from frigate I Gusti Ngurah Rai.

== Bibliography ==
- Gardiner, Robert; Chumbley, Stephen, eds. (1995). Conway's All the World's Fighting Ships 1947–1995. Annapolis, Maryland, USA: Naval Institute Press. ISBN 1-55750-132-7.
- Moore, Capt. John (1984). Jane's Fighting Ships 1984-85. Jane's Information Group. ISBN 978-0710607959.
- Saunders, Stephen, ed. (2009). Jane's Fighting Ships 2009-2010. Jane's Information Group. ISBN 9780710628886.
- Ehlers, Hartmut (1991). "The Naval Facilities at Peenemünde After the German Unification". Warship International. 28 (3). International Naval Research Organization: 227–239. JSTOR 44895220.
