= KRI Teluk Mentawai =

Dry cargo support ships of Indonesian Navy

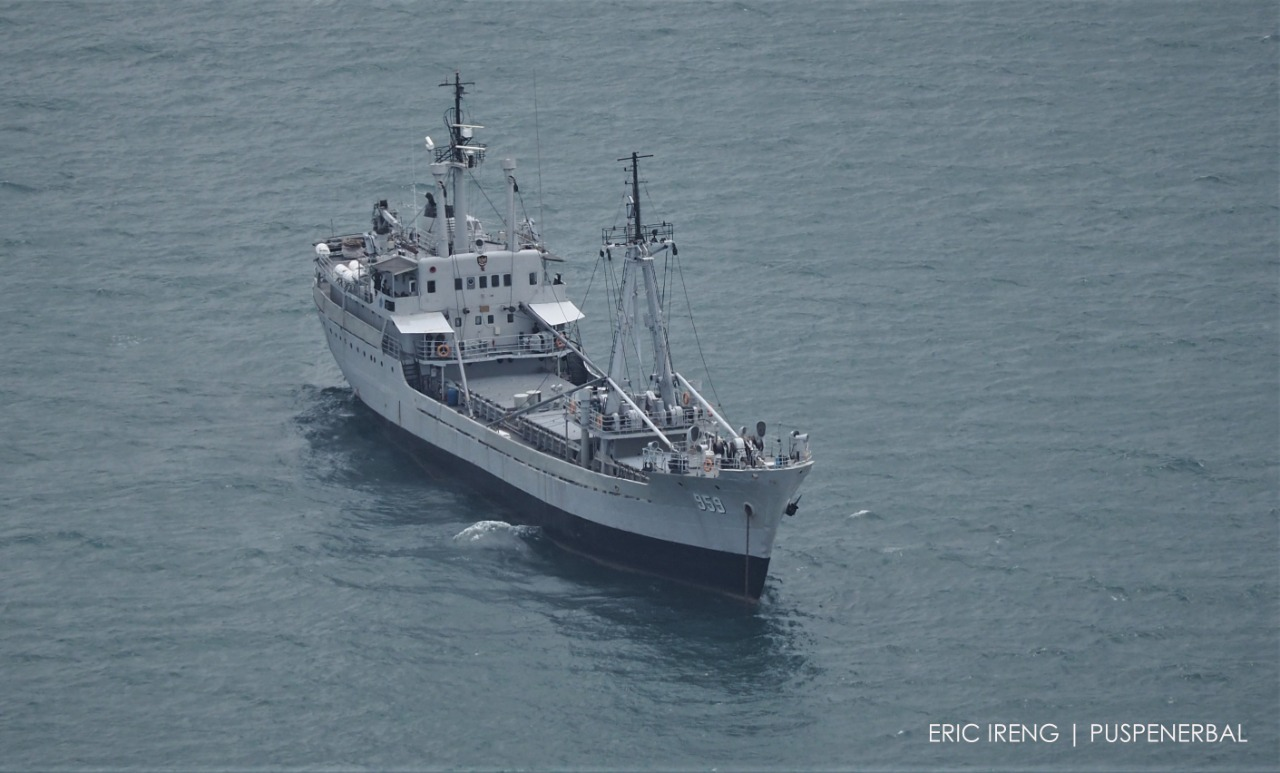
- KRI Teluk Mentawai (959) on 17 January 2020

History

Indonesia
- Name: Mentawai
- Namesake: Mentawai Bay
- Operator: Military Sealift Command
- Builder: Angyalföld Shipyard, Budapest, Hungary
- Yard number: 1987
- Completed: 1964
- Commissioned: 1 September 1964
- Renamed: Teluk Mentawai, 1964
- Home port: Tanjung Priok
- Identification: IMO number: 6413974; Pennant number: 956, 959
- Status: Active

General characteristics
- Class & type: Tisza-class coastal cargo ship
- Type: Dry cargo support ship
- Displacement: 2,400 long tons (2,400 t) full load
- Length: 78.8 m (259 ft)
- Beam: 10.8 m (35 ft)
- Draft: 4.6 m (15 ft)
- Propulsion: 1 × MAN 5-cyl diesel; 1 × shaft
- Speed: 12 knots (22 km/h; 14 mph)
- Range: 3,000 nautical miles (5,600 km) at 11 knots (20 km/h)
- Capacity: 875 long tons (889 t) dry cargo; 11 long tons (11 t) liquid cargo
- Troops: 250
- Complement: 26
- Sensors & processing systems: Radar: Spin trough, I-band
- Armament: 2 × 12.7mm 2M-1 twin-gun

KRI Teluk Mentawai (959) is a dry cargo support ship of the Indonesian Navy.

== Development and design ==
KRI Teluk Mentawai is a Hungarian Tisza-class coastal cargo ship (Project 1849), the design of which is based on the Soviet Keyla-class. It has a length of 78.8 m (259 ft), a beam of 10.8 m (35 ft), with a draft of 4.6 m (15 ft) and her displacement is 2,400 long tons (2,400 t) at full load. The ship is powered by a MAN 5-cylinders diesel engine, with total power output of 1,000 metric horsepower (0.74 MW) distributed in one shaft. The ship has a speed of 12 knots (22 km/h), with range of 3,000 nautical miles (5,600 km) while cruising at 11 knots (20 km/h).

The ship is a cargo coaster ship with a dead weight of 1,828 tonnes has the main task of being a logistics transport ship in its duties as a supporting element of military sea transportation. This ship has three spacious cargo holds and also equipped with six cranes for loading and unloading cargo.

Teluk Mentawai has a complement of 26 personnel, with cargo capacity of 875 long tons (889 t) of dry cargo and 11 long tons (11 t) of liquid cargo. She also able to transport 250 fully-equipped troops. The ship is armed with two 12.7 mm heavy machine guns in 2M-1 twin gun naval mounts, located on the port and starboard side of the ship. In addition, it is equipped with individual weapons in the form of the Soviet-made AK-47.

== Construction and career ==
Teluk Mentawai was built in 1964 by Angyalföld Unit of Hungarian Shipyard & Crane Factory in Budapest, Hungary. The vessel was commissioned on 1 September 1964.

She has been operated by Komando Lintas Laut Militer (Kolinlamil / Military Sealift Command) since 1975. (Note: According to Jane's Fighting Ships, since 1978)

The last repair was carried out in 2005 at the PT. Dok Kodja Bahari (DKB), Tanjung Priok, Jakarta. In the repair, her original engine has been replaced with a new Caterpillar engine made in the United States.

On 12 January 2021, she was deployed to recover and transport debris of Sriwijaya Air Flight 182. On 15 February, after Flight 182 recovery operation, she went into dry docking at the PT. Daya Radar Utama Shipyard, Lampung for routine maintenance.
