= Ministry of Education and Culture (Indonesia) =

Former Government ministry of Indonesia (1945 – 2021)

- Kementerian Pendidikan dan Kebudayaan

Ministry overview
- Formed: 19 August 1945
- Preceding agencies: Department of Teaching (1945–1948); Department of Education and Culture (1948–1955); Department of Teaching, Education, and Culture (1955–1956); Department of Education and Culture (1956–1999); Department of National Education (1999–2009); Ministry of National Education (2009–2011)
- Dissolved: 28 April 2021
- Superseding Ministry: Ministry of Education, Culture, Research and Technology
- Jurisdiction: Government of Indonesia
- Headquarters: Jalan Jenderal Sudirman; Senayan; Jakarta Pusat 10270; Jakarta, Indonesia
- Motto: Tut Wuri Handayani (Javanese, from Ki Hajar Dewantara's quote) ("Encourage from the back")
- Minister responsible: Nadiem Makarim, Minister of Education and Culture (Last)
- Website: kemdikbud.go.id

The Ministry of Education and Culture (Indonesian: Kementerian Pendidikan dan Kebudayaan, abbreviated as Kemendikbud) was a government ministry which organises early childhood education, elementary education, secondary education and community education affairs and the management of culture within the Indonesian government. The ministry once transferred its duty organised higher education affairs at the first presidency of Joko Widodo's Working Cabinet (Joko Widodo), when higher education affairs were transferred to the Ministry of Research, Technology and Higher Education. Then in his second term, its duty transferred back to Ministry of Education and Culture when Ministry of Research, Technology and Higher Education has changed its name to Ministry of Research and Technology/National Research and Innovation Agency.

The ministry was first named the Ministry of Teaching (Kementerian Pengajaran), and the first person who held the position of minister was Ki Hadjar Dewantara.

On 9 April 2021, People's Representative Council approved that this ministry is merged with the Ministry of Research and Technology to form the Ministry of Education, Culture, Research and Technology, while National Research and Innovation Agency separated to a new non-ministerial government agency.

On 13 April 2021, Ali Mochtar Ngabalin, spokesperson and expert professional of Deputy IV (Information and Political Communication) Executive Office of the President of the Republic of Indonesia, announced that the second reshuffle would take place during the second week of April 2021. However, due to many reasons, the second reshuffle was finally announced on 28 April 2021. Unusual for reshuffle happening in Indonesia, this reshuffle was the first of its kind which not only reshuffled the ministers, but also disbanding ministry institutions during the mid-term. In this reshuffle, Nadiem Makarim was appointed the first holder of Minister of Education, Culture, Research, and Technology. In this reshuffle, as the consequence of the fusion, this ministry disbanded along with Ministry of Research and Technology.

== Organization ==
The ministry organisations consist of:

1. Office of the Deputy Minister
2. Secretariat General
3. Directorate General of Teachers and Education Personnel
4. Directorate General of Early Childhood Education and Community Education
5. Directorate General of Primary and Secondary Education
6. Directorate General of Higher Education
7. Directorate General of Culture
8. Inspectorate General
9. Language and Book Development Agency
10. Agency of Research and Development
11. Special Advisor to the Minister on Innovation and Competitiveness
12. Special Advisor to the Minister on Central and Regional Relations
13. Special Advisor to the Minister on Character Development
14. Special Advisor to the Minister on Educational and Cultural Regulations

== See also ==
- Cabinet of Indonesia
