= Teluk Gilimanuk-class landing ship =

Medium landing ship of the Indonesian Navy

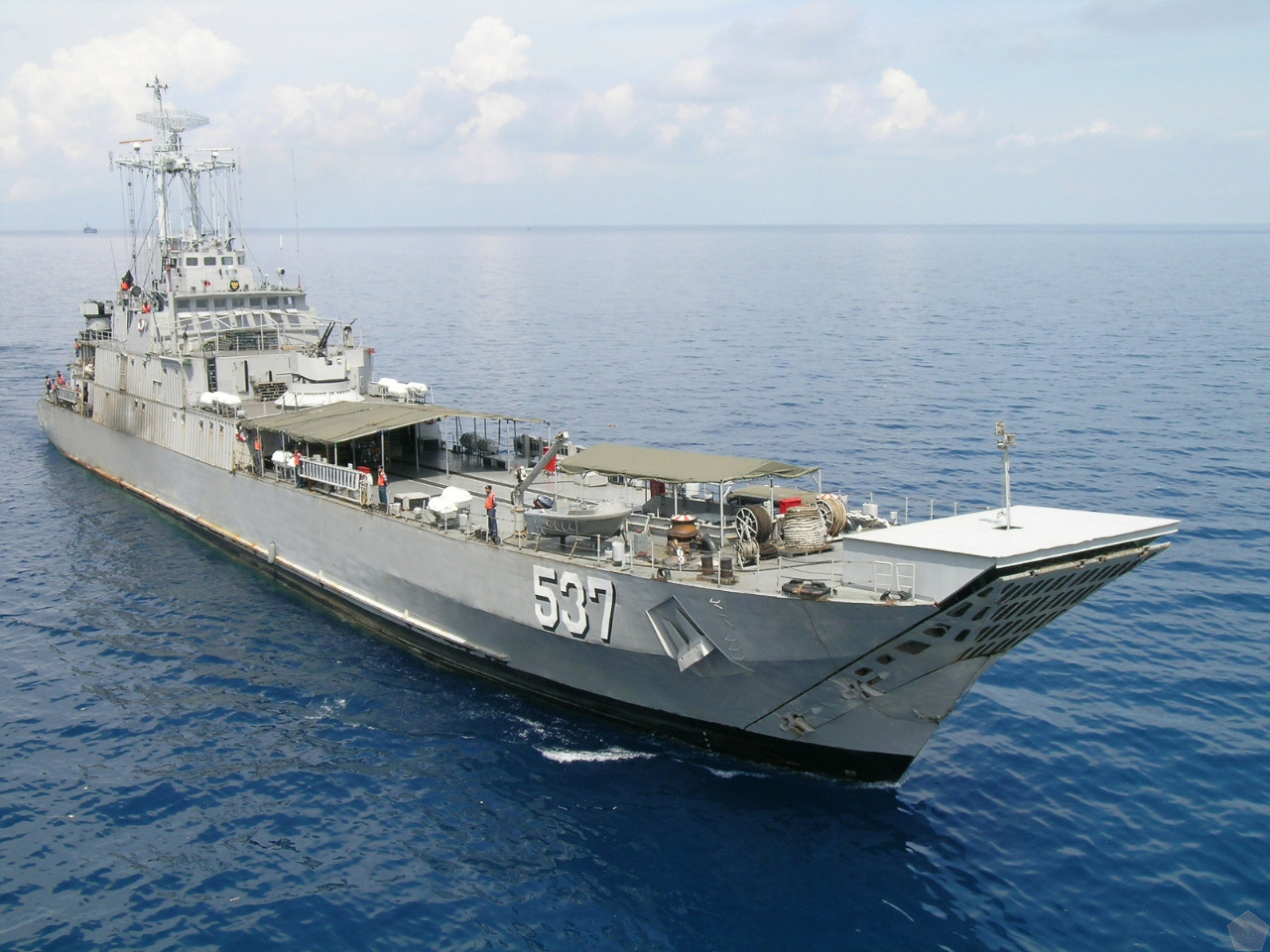
- KRI Teluk Manado

Class overview
- Name: Teluk Gilimanuk class; Hoyerswerda class / Frosch class
- Builders: VEB Peenewerft, Wolgast
- Operators: Volksmarine (former); Indonesian Navy (current)
- Preceded by: Teluk Semangka class
- Succeeded by: Teluk Bintuni class
- Built: 1974–1980
- In service: 1976-1990 (Volksmarine); 1993–present (Indonesian Navy)
- Planned: 14
- Completed: 14
- Active: 10
- Lost: 2
- Retired: 2

General characteristics
- Type: Medium landing ship
- Displacement: Frosch I: 1,950 long tons (1,980 t); Frosch II: 1,700 long tons (1,700 t)
- Length: Frosch I: 98 m (321 ft 6 in); Frosch II: 90.7 m (297 ft 7 in)
- Beam: 11.1 m (36 ft 5 in)
- Draught: 2.8 m (9.2 ft)
- Installed power: Frosch I: 5,000 hp (3.7 MW); Frosch II: 4,408 hp (3.242 MW)
- Propulsion: 2 x 61B 4A diesel engines; 2 x shafts
- Speed: 18 knots (33 km/h; 21 mph)
- Capacity: 11 amphibious tanks or 400–600 tons cargo
- Troops: 1 company of marines
- Complement: 46
- Sensors & processing systems: TSR-333 I-band navigation radar; MR-302 Strut Curve F-band air/surface radar
- Electronic warfare & decoys: 2 x PK-16 chaff launchers
- Armament: Frosch I: 1 × single Bofors 40 mm L/60 gun 1 × twin V-11 37 mm L/63 guns 2 × twin 2M-3 25 mm guns; Frosch II: 2 x twin V-11 37 mm L/63 guns 2 x twin 2M-3 25 mm guns

The Teluk Gilimanuk class is a class of medium landing ships (LSM) currently being operated by Indonesian Navy. They were originally built in East Germany for the Volksmarine as the Hoyerswerda class (NATO reporting name: Frosch I and II classes). These ships were acquired by Indonesian Navy in the 1990s.

== Design ==
Teluk Gilimanuk or Hoyerswerda class consisted of two variants, the Project 108 (Frosch I) regular medium landing ship and Project 109 (Frosch II) combat support ship.

Project 108 (Frosch I) has a length of 98 m (321 ft 6 in), a beam of 11.1 m (36 ft 5 in), with a draught of 2.8 m (9 ft 2 in) and their displacement is 1,950 long tons (1,980 t) at full load. The ships is powered by two diesel engines, with total power output of 5,000 metric horsepower (3.7 MW) distributed in two shafts.

Project 109 (Frosch II) has a length of 90.7 m (297 ft 7 in), a beam of 11.1 m (36 ft 5 in), with a draught of 2.8 m (9 ft 2 in) and their displacement is 1,700 long tons (1,700 t) at full load. The ships is powered by two diesel engines, with total power output of 4,408 metric horsepower (3.242 MW) distributed in two shafts.

Both variants have a speed of 18 knots (33 km/h) They both have a complement of 46 personnel.

The Project 108 has a cargo capacity of 600 long tons (610 t), while the Project 109 has a cargo capacity of 650 long tons (660 t). They are equipped with a 5-ton crane amidships.

The ships were initially armed with two АК-725 twin 57 mm guns, complemented by two AK-230 twin barrel 30 mm guns for Project 108, and two 2М-3 twin 25 mm autocannons for Project 109. Some ships of Project 108 were also equipped with two 40-tube 122 mm rocket launchers. Both variants were also equipped with Muff Cob fire control radar. In Indonesian service, the Project 108 ships were rearmed with one single Bofors 40 mm L/60 gun, one twin V-11 37 mm L/63 guns, and two twin 2М-3 25 mm autocannons, while the Project 109 were rearmed with two twin V-11 37 mm L/63 guns and two twin 2M-3 25 mm autocannons.

== Development ==
Twelve former German Democratic Republic fast medium landing ships (531 to 542) of the Project 108 (Frosch I) class were built by VEB Peenewerft, Wolgast, to an East German design, between 1976 and 1979. This class was named after the East German town of Hoyerswerda.

Logistic support ships of the Project 109 (Frosch II) class were built by the same shipyard as a development of the Frosch I landing ships. Originally commissioned in the Volksmarine on between October 1979 and February 1980.

== Transfer ==
The Hoyerswerda-class ships, and two support ships of the Project 109 (Frosch II) class, were officially transferred to Indonesian Navy, a on 25 August 1993. Refitted in German yards prior to transfer, where all armament was removed, to be replaced later by Indonesia after delivery. The Hoyerswerda-class ships were a valuable addition to the Indonesian Navy's landing forces in view of the block obsolescence of their, then current, LST Mark 3 landing ships, obtained from the United States. The LST Mark 3s were designed in 1943, and built before 1946. They were powered by steam engines. After transfer to Indonesia, the two logistic support ships of the Project 109 (Frosch II) class were fitted with 37 mm guns, and with rocket launchers mounted forward of the bridge. They were commissioned 25 April 1995.

The Teluk Gilimanuk-class ships were bought on 3 September 1992 based on President Instruction No. 3/1992 that was issued by late President Soeharto. The procurement also included 16 Parchim and 9 Kondor-class vessels worth a total cost of $482 million.

== Operational history ==
Originally fourteen Teluk Gilimanuk-class LSMs were commissioned by the Indonesian Navy. All were built by VEB Peenewerft. As of 2022 eleven ships are in active service, two were lost in accidents and one ship was retired.

Construction data
Name	Hull no.	Subclass/Project	Laid down	Launched	Acquired	Status
Teluk Gilimanuk	531	Project 108 (Frosch I)	25 November 1974	1 July 1975	12 July 1994	Active. Ex-Hoyerswerda
Teluk Celukan Bawang	532	Project 108 (Frosch I)	7 March 1975	19 December 1975	25 February 1994	Active. Ex-Hagenow
Teluk Cendrawasih	533	Project 108 (Frosch I)	10 June 1975	2 January 1976	9 December 1994	Active. Ex-Frankfurt/Oder
Teluk Berau	534	Project 108 (Frosch I)	10 September 1975	15 July 1976	10 March 1995	Stricken and sank in 2012 after used as target ship for Yakhont missile during Armada Jaya XXXI Exercise. Ex-Eberswalde-Finow
Teluk Peleng	535	Project 108 (Frosch I)	11 December 1975	2 October 1976	23 September 1993	Foundered in November 2013 after a collision with concrete bollard. Ex-Lubben
Teluk Sibolga	536	Project 108 (Frosch I)	17 March 1976	18 January 1977	15 December 1993	Active. Ex-Schwerin
Teluk Manado	537	Project 108 (Frosch I)	21 August 1976	6 April 1977	2 June 1995	Active. Ex-Neubrandenburg
Teluk Hading	538	Project 108 (Frosch I)	22 November 1976	10 June 1977	12 July 1994	Stricken 2024 and sunk as target April 2026. Ex-Cottbus
Teluk Parigi	539	Project 108 (Frosch I)	21 February 1977	22 September 1977	21 July 1995	Active. Ex-Anklam
Teluk Lampung	540	Project 108 (Frosch I)	5 May 1977	27 December 1977	26 April 1994	Active. Ex-Schwedt
Teluk Jakarta	541	Project 108 (Frosch I)	18 August 1977	8 March 1978	19 September 1994	Sank after being hit by high waves near Kangean Island in July 2020. Ex-Eisenhüttenstadt
Teluk Sangkulirang	542	Project 108 (Frosch I)	2 November 1977	30 May 1978	9 December 1994	Active. Ex-Grimmen
Teluk Cirebon	543	Project 109 (Frosch II)	26 January 1978	30 August 1978	25 April 1995	Active. Ex-Nordperd
Teluk Sabang	544	Project 109 (Frosch II)	16 April 1978	30 October 1978	25 April 1995	Active. Ex-Südperd

== See also ==
- List of active Indonesian Navy ships

Equivalent landing ships of the same era

- Atsumi class
- Type 073
- Kumbhir class

== Bibliography ==
- Gardiner, Robert; Chumbley, Stephen, eds. (1995). Conway's All the World's Fighting Ships 1947–1995. Annapolis, Maryland, USA: Naval Institute Press. ISBN 1-55750-132-7.
- Moore, Capt. John (1984). Jane's Fighting Ships 1984-85. Jane's Information Group. ISBN 978-0710607959.
- Saunders, Stephen, ed. (2009). Jane's Fighting Ships 2009-2010. Jane's Information Group. ISBN 9780710628886.
