= Ministry of Research and Technology (Indonesia) =

Former Government ministry of Indonesia (1962 – 2021)

Ministry of Research and Technology/National Research and Innovation Agency of Republic Indonesia
- Kementerian Riset dan Teknologi/Badan Riset dan Inovasi Nasional
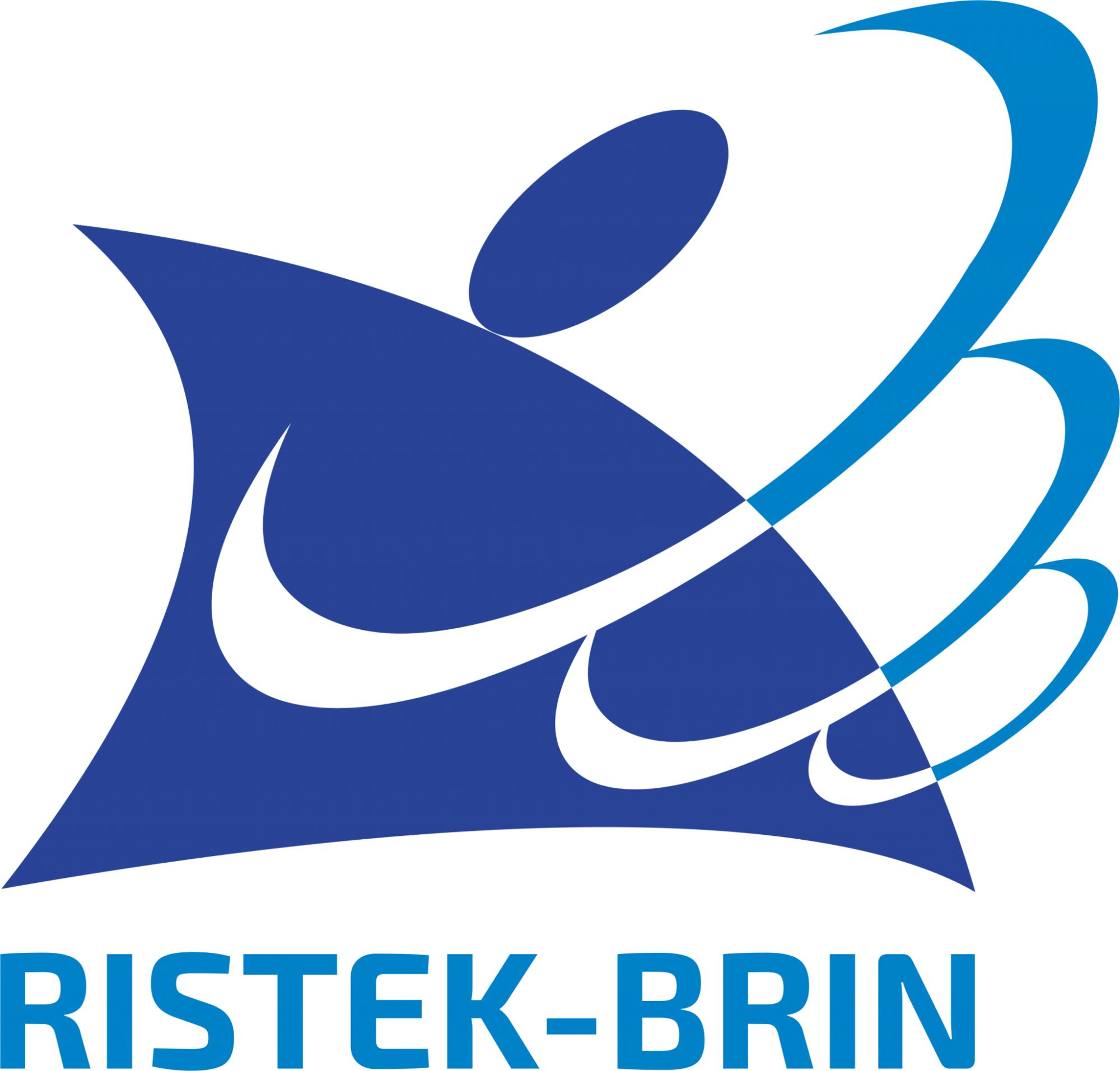

Ministry overview
- Formed: 16 March 1962
- Preceding Ministry: Ministry of Research, Technology and Higher Education
- Dissolved: 28 April 2021
- Superseding agencies: Ministry of Education, Culture, Research and Technology; National Research and Innovation Agency
- Jurisdiction: Government of Indonesia
- Headquarters: Gedung D Pintu Satu Senayan; Jalan Jenderal Sudirman; Senayan; Central Jakarta 10270; Jakarta, Indonesia
- Minister responsible: Bambang Brodjonegoro, Minister of Research and Technology (Last)/Head of National Research and Innovation Agency (First)
- Child agencies: Research Center for Science and Technology (PUSPIPTEK) Serpong; Eijkman Institute for Molecular Biology; Science and Technology Demonstration Center (PUSPA Science and Technology); Agro Techno Park (ATP) Palembang; Business Technology Center (BTC); Bio Island; Agri business
- Website: ristekbrin.go.id

Ministry of Research and Technology of the Republic of Indonesia (abbreviated as Kemenristek, or RISTEK-BRIN on its logo) was a government ministry that has the task of conducting affairs in the field of research, science and technology to assist the President of Indonesia in carrying out state. The ministry was formerly known as the Ministry of Research, Technology and Higher Education of the Republic of Indonesia.

== History ==
Founded in 1962 under the name National Research Affairs Ministry of the Republic of Indonesia, and in 1973 changed its name to the Ministry of Research. Year 1986-2001 as Minister of State for Research and Technology, and in 2002 according Circular Minister of State for Administrative Reform concerning Naming Government Agencies, Office of the Secretary of State referred to the Ministry of Research and Technology. In 2005 pursuant to Presidential Decree No. 9 In 2005, this institution called the Ministry of Research and Technology (KNRT) or as the State Ministry of Research and Technology. In 2009 pursuant to Presidential Decree 47 of 2009 referred to the Ministry of Research and Technology.

In Working Cabinet in 2014, Directorate General of Higher Education, previously under Ministry of Education, was merged into Ministry of Research & Technology. However, in Onward Indonesia Cabinet, the ministry later reverted to its original form as Ministry of Research and Technology in pursuant of Presidential Decision No. 113/P/2019 and Presidential Decree No. 73/2019, while Higher Education returned again to Ministry of Education and Culture (Indonesia) according to Presidential Decree No. 72/2019 In addition, this ministry also included a new agency, National Research and Innovation Agency, which established by Presidential Decree No. 74/2019, resulting the minister also has role as the Head of National Research and Innovation Agency.

On 9 April 2021, People's Representative Council approved that this ministry is merged with the Ministry of Education and Culture to form the Ministry of Education, Culture, Research and Technology, while National Research and Innovation Agency separated to a new non-ministerial government agency. At the same time, Bambang Brodjonegoro announced his departure in one event at Hasanuddin University told the audience the visit will be the last event he attended on his capacity as the Minister and Head of BRIN. On 10 April 2021, Bambang Brodjonegoro reported resigned from his positions as the Minister and Head of BRIN. On 28 April 2021, Nadiem Makarim inaugurated as the new minister for Ministry of Education, Culture, Research and Technology, and Laksana Tri Handoko appointed as new Head of National Research and Innovation Agency, effectively ending the ministry.

== Logo ==
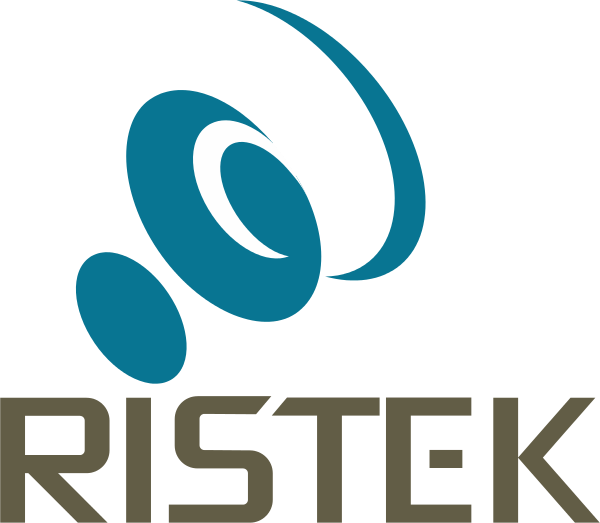
Logo of Ministry of Research and Technology (Before 2015)

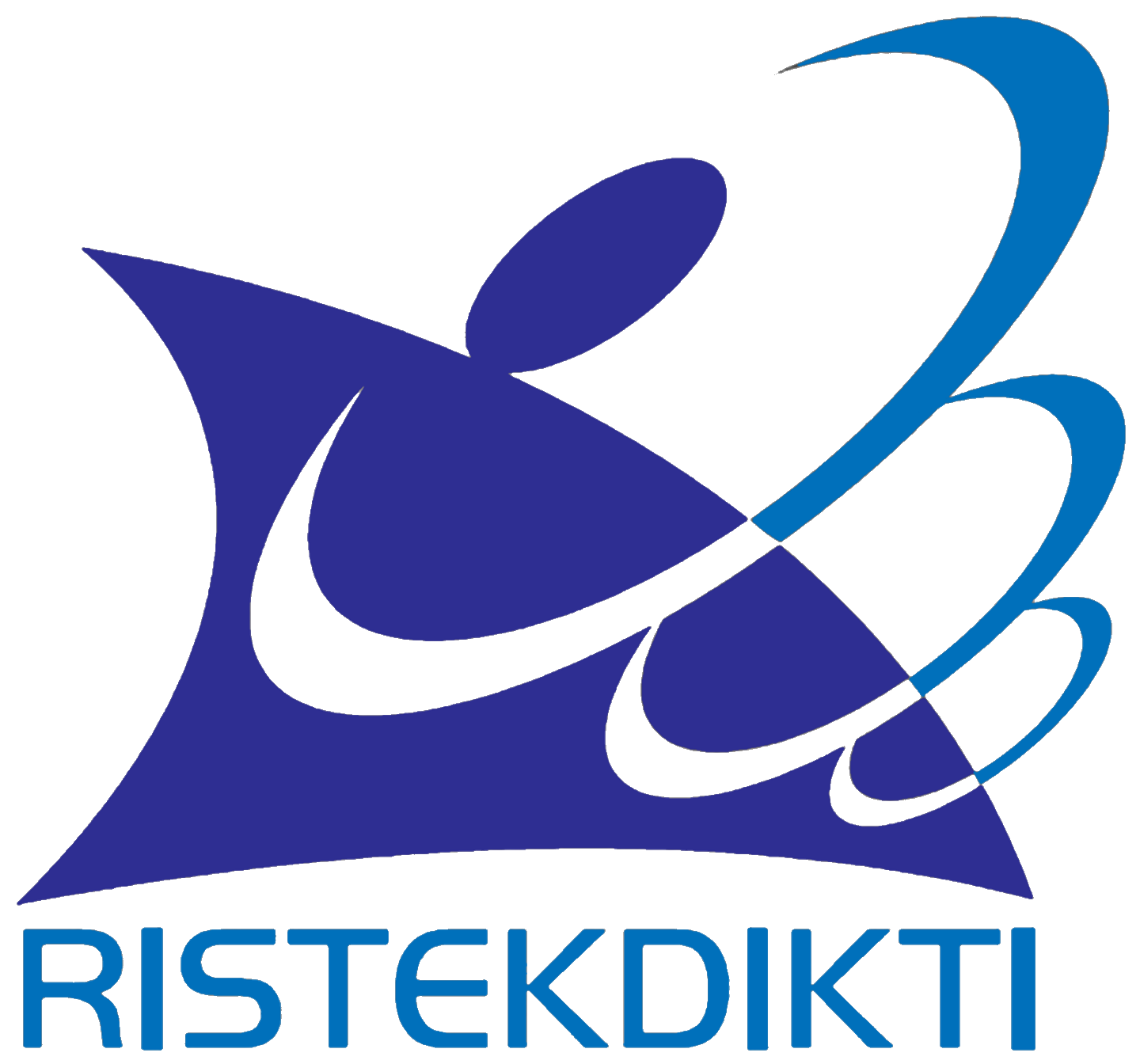
Logo of the Ministry of Research, Technology, and Higher Education (2015–2019)

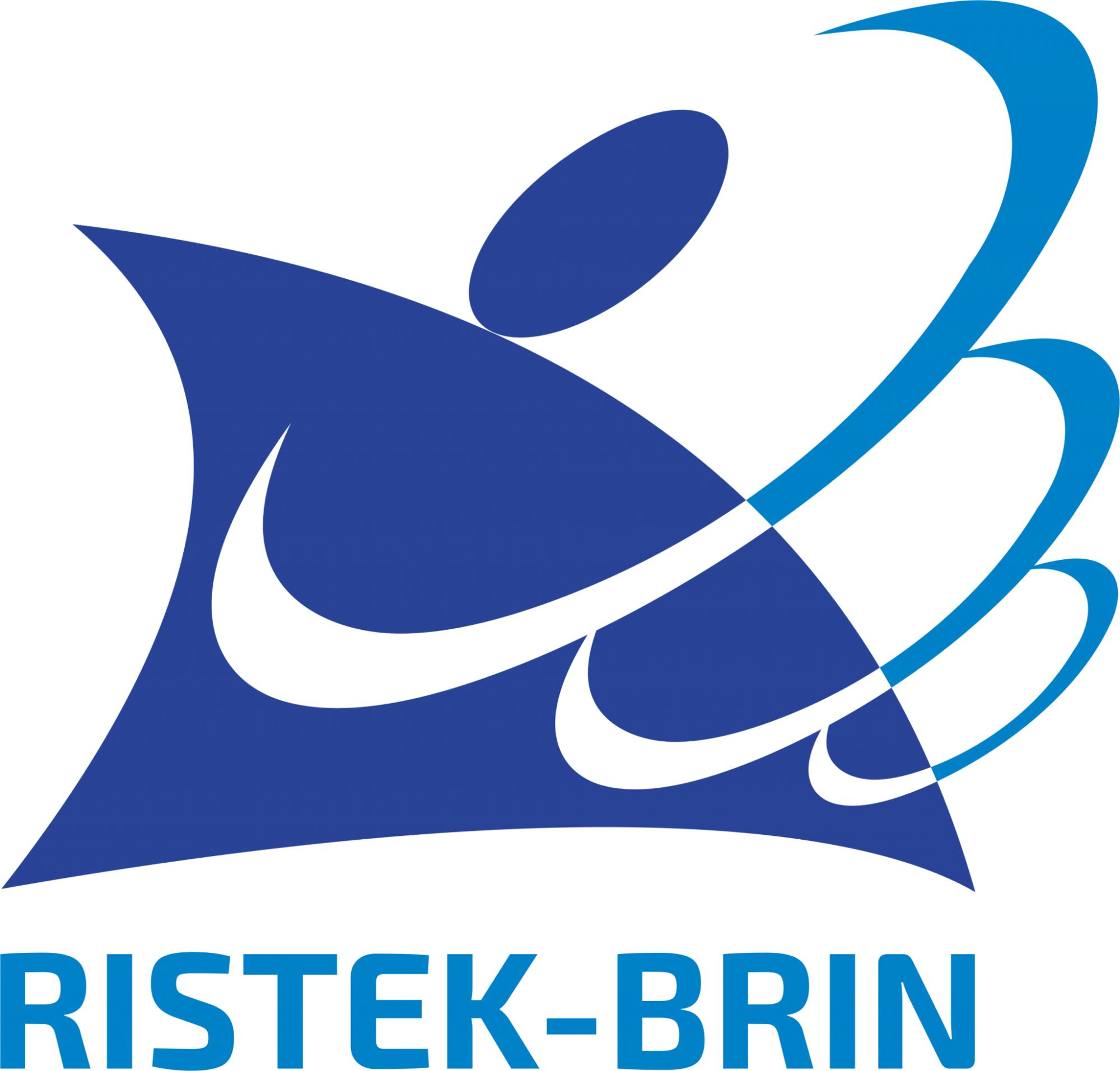
Logo of Ministry of Research and Technology/National Research and Innovation Agency (2019–2021)

== Function ==
1. Formulate and establish policies in the field of research and technology
2. Coordinate and synchronize policies in the field of research and technology
3. Manage of property/wealth of the country is the responsibility of the Ministry of Research and Technology
4. Oversight of the implementation of the tasks of the Ministry of Research and Technology

== Organization Structure ==
Prior its disbandment, based on its last constituting document, Presidential Decree No. 73/2019, and amended with Presidential Decree No. 94/2019, the minister's office is quite simple and minimalist, unlike its form during its time as Ministry of Research, Technology, and Higher Education. Much of its directorates originally placed to the ministry were placed in National Research and Innovation Agency.

1. Office of The Minister of Research and Technology
2. Ministerial General Secretariat
3. Senior Advisor in Infrastructure
4. Senior Advisor in Research Relevance and Productivity

The National Research and Innvovation Agency, based on its last constituting document, Presidential Decree No. 74/2019, and amended with Presidential Decree No. 95/2019, consisted of:

1. Office of The Head of National Research and Innovation Agency
2. Senior Advisers
3. Agency Secretariat
4. Office of the Deputy Head in Strengthening Research and Development
  1. Directorate of Research and Development System
  2. Directorate of Research and Community Service
  3. Directorate of Industrial Technology Development
  4. Directorate of Intellectual Property Management
5. Office of the Deputy Head in Strengthening Innovation
  1. Directorate of Innovation System
  2. Directorate of Technology-based Startup Companies
  3. Directorate of Industrial Innovation
6. Office of General Inspectorate

== Coordination ==
During its existence, based on Presidential Decree No. 4 of 2003 on the co-ordination of formulation, Strategic Policy Development and Implementation of National Science and Technology, the Ministry of Research and Technology is operationally responsible for coordination with the following governmental non-ministerial agencies:

1. Indonesian Institute of Sciences (LIPI)
2. National Institute of Aeronautics and Space (LAPAN)
3. Agency for the Assessment and Application of Technology (BPPT)
4. National Nuclear Energy Agency (BATAN)
5. Nuclear Energy Regulatory Agency (BAPETEN)
6. Coordination Agency for Surveys and Mapping (BAKOSURTANAL)
7. National Standardization Agency (BSN)

Ministry of Research and Technology also co-ordinate, and manage institutions as follows:

1. Research Center for Science and Technology (PUSPIPTEK) Serpong
2. Eijkman Institute for Molecular Biology or Eijkman (LBME)
3. Science and Technology Demonstration Center (PUSPA Science and Technology)
4. Agro Techno Park (ATP) Palembang
5. Business Technology Center (BTC)
6. Bio Island
7. Agribusiness

== List of ministers ==
No.	Minister	Took office	Left office	Cabinet
1	Soedjono Djoened Poesponegoro	6 March 1962	22 February 1966	Third Working Cabinet; Fourth Working Cabinet; Dwikora Cabinet
2	Suhadi Reksowardojo	22 February 1966	25 July 1966	Revised Dwikora Cabinet; Second Revised Dwikora Cabinet
3	Sumitro Djojohadikusumo	28 March 1973	28 March 1978	Second Development Cabinet
4	B. J. Habibie	28 March 1978	16 March 1998	Third Development Cabinet; Fourth Development Cabinet; Fifth Development Cabinet; Sixth Development Cabinet
5	Rahardi Ramelan	16 March 1998	21 May 1998	Seventh Development Cabinet
6	Zuhal	23 May 1998	20 October 1999	Development Reform Cabinet
7	Muhammad A.S. Hikam	26 October 1999	23 July 2001	National Unity Cabinet
8	Hatta Rajasa	10 August 2001	29 September 2004	Mutual Assistance Cabinet
9	Kusmayanto Kadiman	21 October 2004	20 October 2009	United Indonesia Cabinet
10	Suharna Surapranata	22 October 2009	19 October 2011	Second United Indonesia Cabinet
11	Gusti Muhammad Hatta	19 October 2011	20 October 2014	Second United Indonesia Cabinet
12	Mohamad Nasir	27 October 2014	20 October 2019	Working Cabinet
13	Bambang Brodjonegoro	23 October 2019	28 April 2021	Onward Indonesia Cabinet
