= Muff Cob =

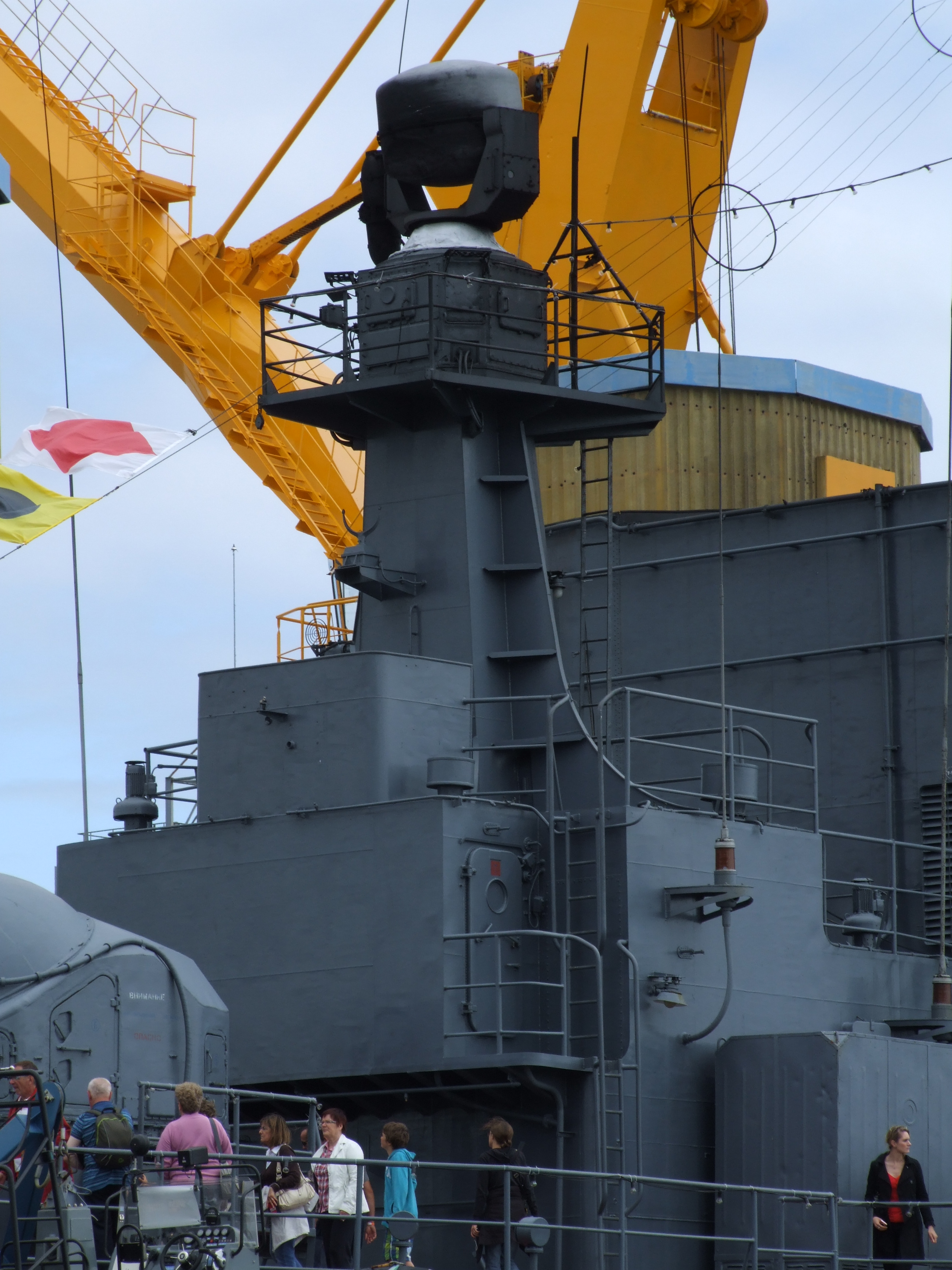
- Country of origin: Soviet Union
- Introduced: 1962
- Frequency: C(G/H); H

The MR-103 Bars (NATO reporting name: Muff Cob) is a type of fire-control radar first used by the Soviet Union and now by several other countries. It first came into service in or about 1962, and is used to control 57 millimetres (2.2 in) guns.

It has similarities to Drum Tilt, but unlike Drum Tilt, Muff Cob elevates to track its target, and is considered to be much more stable. It is usually twinned with an AK-725-MR-103 Fire Control System, and is fitted with a television camera to video its target.
