= 1st Fleet Command =

Komando Armada I
- Active: 1985–present
- Country: Indonesia
- Type: Naval Battle Fleet
- Role: Naval Warfare
- Size: 101 ships and Several aircraft
- Part of: Indonesian Fleet Command
- Garrison/HQ: Tanjungpinang, Riau Islands
- Mottos: Ghora Wira Madya Jala (Sanskrit, lit. 'Valiant Knights in the Middle of the Ocean')
- Baret: NAVY BLUE
- Website: koarmada1.tnial.mil.id

Commanders
- Commander: Rear Admiral Yoos Suryono Hadi
- Chief of Staff: Commodore Haris Bima Bayuseto
- Inspector: Commodore Sunarto
- Head of Expert Staff Group: Commodore Buddy Suseto

The 1st Fleet Command (Indonesian: Komando Armada I abbreviated as Koarmada I) is one of the fleet commands under the Indonesian Fleet Command, which covers the western maritime region of Indonesia.

== History ==
Based on the Commander of the Armed Forces' Decree Number: SKEP/171/III/1985 dated March 30, 1985, the Indonesian Navy was divided into two operational areas, namely the Western Fleet Command and the Eastern Fleet Command. Subsequently, based on the Navy Chief of Staff's Decree No. SKEP/4033/XI/1987 dated November 17, 1987, the birth date of the Indonesian Fleet was established as December 5, which is henceforth known as the Indonesian Fleet Day.

On May 11, 2018, the Commander of the Indonesian National Armed Forces, Air Chief Marshal Hadi Tjahjanto, inaugurated four new units, including the 3rd Infantry Division/Kostrad, the 3rd Indonesian Navy Fleet Command (Koarmada III), the 3rd Marine Corps of the Indonesian Navy (Pasmar 3), and the 3rd Air Operations Command (Koopsau III). In addition, the names of the Western Fleet Command were changed to Fleet Command I, and the Eastern Fleet Command was renamed to Fleet Command II. These additions and renaming of units were part of the Indonesian National Armed Forces' (TNI) plan as outlined in Presidential Regulation Number 10 of 2010 and Presidential Regulation Number 62 of 2016, as well as the 100-day work program of the Commander of the Armed Forces. The renaming of the Western Fleet Command (Koarmabar) to Fleet Command I was in accordance with Navy Chief of Staff Regulation Number 18 of 2018 concerning the Renaming of the Fleet Command and Marine Corps.

Due to the geographical constellation of areas deemed to have strategic vulnerabilities, such as the Sabang Waters, Malacca Strait, Singapore Strait, North Natuna Sea, and the Indonesian Archipelagic Sea Lane I, which traverses the Karimata Strait, Sunda Strait, Java Sea, and the Indian Ocean, the decision was made to relocate the headquarters of Fleet Command I based on Navy Chief of Staff Decree Number Kep/2794/VIII/2022 dated August 8, 2022. The Fleet Command I was relocated to Tanjung Pinang, and officially inaugurated on December 5, 2022, coinciding with the Indonesian Fleet Day, during a Fleet Day ceremony at Fleet Command I Headquarters, led by Vice Admiral Ahmadi Heri Purwono as the Ceremony Inspector.

== Duties ==
Operational Command

- Conduct maritime intelligence operations to support naval operational execution.
- Carry out naval combat operations within the framework of War Military Operations, either in joint operations or independently.
- Conduct Military Operations Other Than War, including routine naval operations or maritime security operations within * designated areas in accordance with the policies of the Commander of the Indonesian National Armed Forces.

Training Command

- Develop the capabilities and strength of the Integrated Fleet Weapon System components (SSAT).
- Enhance naval warfare capabilities.
- Prepare operational readiness to conduct both OMP and OMSP for sea control and the projection of power ashore via the sea, in the context of training enforcement and law enforcement at sea, as per the policies of the Commander of the Indonesian National Armed Forces (TNI).
- Develop maritime potential to become a national defense and security force at sea.

== Base ==
- I Main Naval Base

- Sabang Naval Base
- Simeulue Naval Base
- Lhokseumawe Naval Base
- Tanjung Balai Asahan Naval Base
- Dumai Naval Base
- Sabang Maintenance and Repair Facility
- Belawan Maintenance and Repair Facility

- II Main Naval Base

- Sibolga Naval Base
- Nias Naval Base
- Bengkulu Naval Base

- III Main Naval Base

- Palembang Naval Base
- Bangka Belitung Naval Base
- Lampung Naval Base
- Banten Naval Base
- Bandung Naval Base
- Cirebon Lanal Naval Base
- Jakarta Maintenance and Repair Facility
- Pondok Dayung Maintenance and Repair Facility

- IV Main Naval Base

- Bintan Naval Base
- Tanjung Balai Karimun Naval Base
- Dabo Singkep Naval Base
- Tarempa Naval Base
- Lanal Ranai
- Ranai Naval Base

- XII Main Naval Base

- Lanal Pangkalan Bun
- Lanal Ketapang
- Lanal Sambas

== Unit ==
=== Operational Groups ===
- 1st Fleet Sea Combat Group
- 1st Fleet Sea Security Group

=== Operational Commands ===
- 1st Fleet Amphibious Ship Force
- 1st Fleet Escort Force
- 1st Fleet Fast Craft Force
- 1st Fleet Submarine Force
- 1st Fleet Auxiliary Ship Force
- 1st Fleet Patrol Ship Force
- 1st Fleet Minehunter Force
- 1st Fleet Frogman Force
- 1st Fleet Marine Force
- 1st Fleet Divers and Underwater Rescue Command
- 1st Fleet Air Force
- 1st Fleet Training Command
- 1st Fleet Military Police Command

== Fleet ==
=== 1st Fleet Escort Force ===
1. KRI Bung Tomo (357)
2. KRI John Lie (358)
3. KRI Usman Harun (359)
4. KRI Bung Karno (369)
5. KRI Kapitan Pattimura (371)
6. KRI Cut Nyak Dien (375)
7. KRI Sultan Thaha Syaifuddin (376)
8. KRI Sutanto (377)
9. KRI Sutedi Senaputra (378)
10. KRI Wiratno (379)
11. KRI Tjiptadi (381)
12. KRI Imam Bonjol (383)
13. KRI Teuku Umar (385)
14. KRI Silas Papare (386)

=== 1st Fleet Amphibious Ship Force ===
1. KRI Teluk Gilimanuk (531)
2. KRI Teluk Celukan Bawang (532)
3. KRI Teluk Sibolga (536)
4. KRI Teluk Cirebon (543)
5. KRI Teluk Sabang (544)
6. KRI Semarang (594)

=== 1st Fleet Fast Craft Force ===
1. KRI Kerambit (627)
2. KRI Halasan (630)
3. KRI Todak (631)
4. KRI Lemadang (632)
5. KRI Clurit (641)
6. KRI Kujang (642)
7. KRI Beladau (643)
8. KRI Alamang (644)
9. KRI Surik (645)
10. KRI Siwar (646)
11. KRI Parang (647)
12. KRI Golok (688)

=== 1st Fleet Minehunter Force ===
1st Fleet Minehunter Force
- 1st Fleet Minehunter Force
- Country: Indonesia
- Branch: Indonesian Navy
- Type: Minehunter flotilla
- Part of: 1st Fleet Command
- Motto: Pradipta Jaya Jales Yudha
- Website: koarmada1.tnial.mil.id

Commanders
- Commander: Colonel Yusup Yanto

The 1st Fleet Minehunter Force (Indonesian: Satuan Kapal Ranjau Komando Armada I abbreviated as Satran Koarmada I) is responsible for developing combat strength and capabilities in mine warfare and anti-air warfare to enhance combat effectiveness, particularly in the field of mine warfare. Additionally, this force removes or detonates naval mines to eliminate threats posed by them and ensures waterways remain clear for safe navigation or military operations. Its order of battle is:

1. KRI Pulau Rusa (726)
2. KRI Pulau Rangsang (727)

=== 1st Fleet Patrol Ship Force ===
There are more than 62 warships in the 1st Fleet Patrol Ship Force

=== 1st Fleet Auxiliary Ship Force ===
1. KRI Bontang (907)
2. KRI Leuser (924)
3. KRI Rigel (933)
4. KRI Spica (934)
5. KRI Pollux (935)

== See also ==
- List of active Indonesian Navy ships
- List of former ships of the Indonesian Navy
- Indonesian Fleet Command
- Military Sealift Command
