= 1st Fleet Fast Craft Force =

1st Fleet Fast Craft Force 1st Fleet Command
- Active: 26 October 2010 – present
- Country: Indonesia
- Branch: Indonesian Navy
- Type: Fast Attack Craft Force
- Part of: 1st Fleet Command
- Website: koarmada1.tnial.mil.id

Commanders
- Commander: Colonel Bagus Cahya Utama

The 1st Fleet Amphibious Ship Force (Indonesian: Satuan Kapal Cepat Komando Armada I abbreviated as Satkat Koarmada I) is part of the Indonesian 1st Fleet Sea Security Group and the Command for operational development under the 1st Fleet Command. This unit has the primary function of serving as the first strike force or neutralizing enemy surface ships attempting to violate maritime law, launch attacks, or carry out invasions. In addition, it also functions as air defense against enemy attacks, reconnaissance, and target search operations, as well as conducting electronic warfare.

== Order of Battle ==
1. KRI Kerambit (627)
2. KRI Halasan (630)
3. KRI Todak (631)
4. KRI Lemadang (632)
5. KRI Clurit (641)
6. KRI Kujang (642)
7. KRI Beladau (643)
8. KRI Alamang (644)
9. KRI Surik (645)
10. KRI Siwar (646)
11. KRI Parang (647)
12. KRI Golok (688)
