= Yudo Margono =

Indonesian admiral (born 1965)

Admiral Yudo Margono
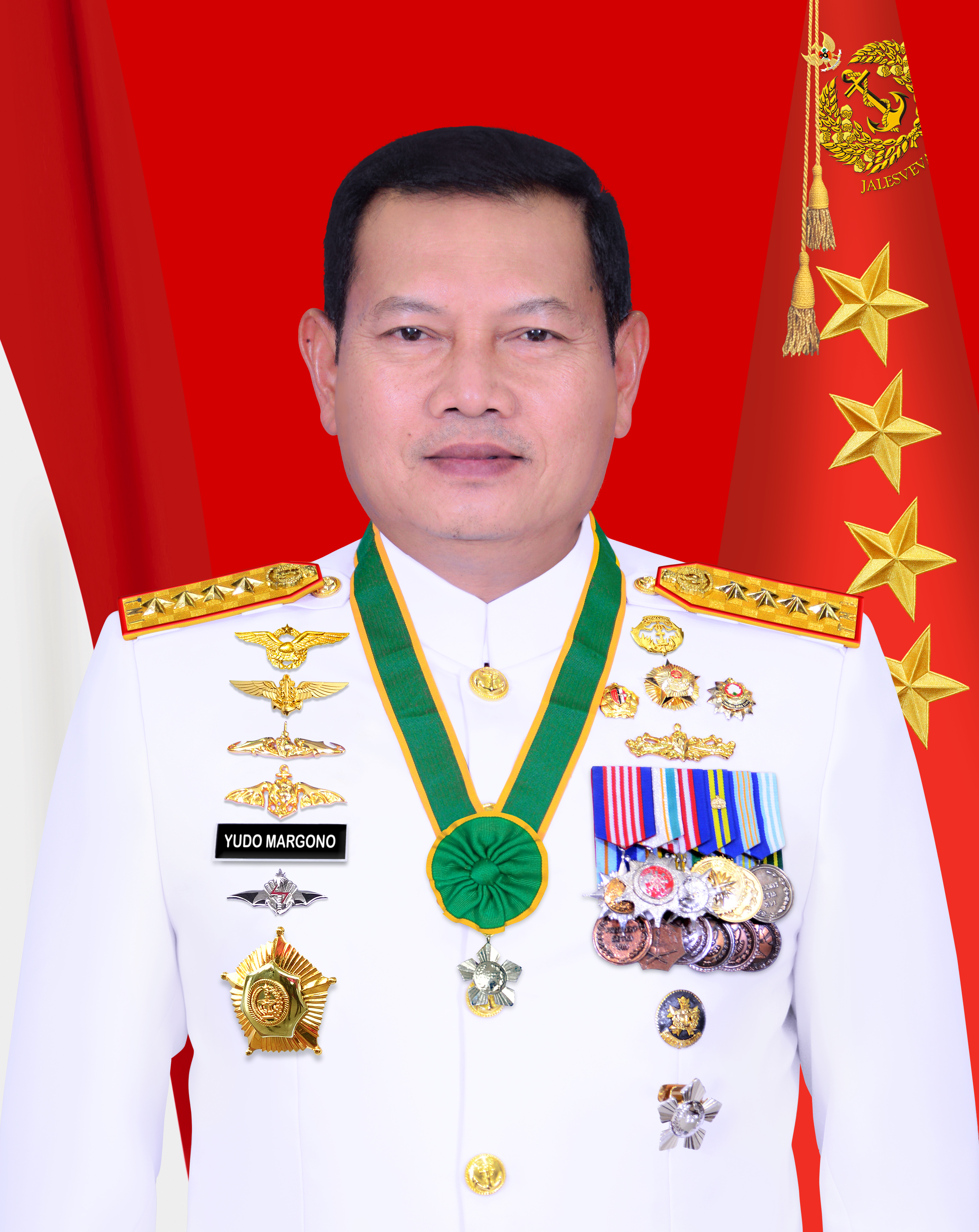
- Official portrait, 2022

Commander of the National Armed Forces
- In office 19 December 2022 – 22 November 2023
- President: Joko Widodo
- Preceded by: General Andika Perkasa
- Succeeded by: General Agus Subiyanto

Chief of Staff of the Navy
- In office 20 May 2020 – 28 December 2022
- Preceded by: Admiral Siwi Sukma Adji
- Succeeded by: Admiral Muhammad Ali

Commander of 1st Defense Territorial Joint Command
- In office 24 September 2019 – 26 May 2020
- Succeeded by: Vice Admiral ING Ariawan

Commander of Indonesian Navy 1st Fleet Command
- In office 15 March 2018 – 24 September 2019
- Preceded by: Rear Admiral Aan Kurnia
- Succeeded by: Rear Admiral Muhammad Ali

Personal details
- Born: 26 November 1965 (age 60) Madiun, Indonesia
- Spouse: Veronica Yulis Prihayati
- Awards: See Honours

Military service
- Allegiance: Indonesia
- Branch/service: Indonesian Navy
- Years of service: 1988–2023
- Rank: Admiral
- Unit: Fleet Forces
- Commands: Commander of the National Armed Forces; Chief of Staff of the Navy; Indonesian Navy 1st Fleet Command; Military Sealift Command; KRI Ahmad Yani (351); KRI Sutanto (377); KRI Pandrong (801)

Admiral Yudo Margono (born 26 November 1965) is an Indonesian admiral who previously served as the 22nd Commander of the Indonesian National Armed Forces, He was appointed by President of Indonesia Joko Widodo in December 2022, replacing the retiring General Andika Perkasa.

== Early life and education ==
Yudo Margono was born in Balerejo, Madiun on 26 November 1965. His parents were farmers. According to him, after graduating from high school, he along with several friends decided to sign up to join the Indonesian Naval Academy, though he was the only one accepted between his friends. He was assigned to the Indonesian Navy, and graduated from the academy in 1988.

== Career ==
He began his navy career as an assistant to the missile officer aboard KRI Wilhelmus Zakarias Yohannes, then was promoted to head of operations aboard KRI Ki Hajar Dewantara and executive officer for KRI Fatahillah. He was then given command over the vessels KRI Pandrong, KRI Sutanto, and KRI Ahmad Yani. In 2004, he was appointed commander of the naval base at Tual, then in 2008 in Sorong until 2010. Between 2010 and 2012, he was assigned as escort commander and later training officer of the Eastern Fleet. Between 2014 and 2015, he worked at the naval headquarters, before being assigned to command the naval base at Belawan until 2016. He held the rank of colonel in 2013, when he was training officer.

Yudo Margono became chief of staff of the Western fleet command in 2016–2017, commander of the military sealift command in 2017–2018, and then commander of the western fleet (reorganized into 1st fleet) in 2018–2019. After this tenure, he became joint commander of the 1st defense region, directly under the Commander of the Indonesian National Armed Forces. He had been promoted to rear admiral in December 2017,

As joint commander, Yudo Margono took part in the handling of the COVID-19 outbreak in 2020, particularly hospitals in Galang Island and the Kemayoran Athletes Village. He was appointed navy chief of staff on 20 May 2020, and along with the appointment he was promoted to a four-star admiral. He was awarded the Member (AM) in the Military Division of the Order of Australia on 3 May 2022 for strengthening relations between the navies of Indonesia and Australia.

== Honours ==
Yudo Margono is the recipient of the following honours:

Star of Mahaputera, 2nd Class (Bintang Mahaputera Adipradana) (2024)
Military Distinguished Service Star (Bintang Dharma)	Grand Meritorious Military Order Star (Bintang Yudha Dharma Utama)	Navy Meritorious Service Star, 1st Class (Bintang Jalasena Utama)
Army Meritorious Service Star, 1st Class (Bintang Kartika Eka Pakçi Utama)	Air Force Meritorius Service Star, 1st Class (Bintang Swa Bhuwana Paksa Utama)	National Police Meritorious Service Star, 1st Class (Bintang Bhayangkara Utama)
Grand Meritorious Military Order Star, 2nd Class (Bintang Yudha Dharma Pratama)	Navy Meritorious Service Star, 2nd Class (Bintang Jalasena Pratama)	Grand Meritorious Military Order Star, 3rd Class (Bintang Yudha Dharma Nararya)
Navy Meritorious Service Star, 3rd Class (Bintang Jalasena Nararya)	Member of the Order of Australia (Australia) (2022)	Pingat Jasa Gemilang (Tentera) (Singapore) (2022)
Courageous Commander of the Most Gallant Order of Military Service (Pingat Panglima Gagah Angkatan Tentera) (Malaysia)	Darjah Utama Bakti Cemerlang (Tentera) (Singapore) (2024)	Military Long Service Medal, 32 Years (Satyalancana Kesetiaan 32 Tahun)
Medal for Active Duty in the Navy (Satyalancana Dharma Samudra)	Military Long Service Medal, 24 Years (Satyalancana Kesetiaan 24 Tahun)	Military Long Service Medal, 16 Years (Satyalancana Kesetiaan 16 Tahun)
Military Long Service Medal, 8 Years (Satyalancana Kesetiaan 8 Tahun)	Military Instructor Service Medals (Satyalancana Dwidya Sistha)	Medal for National Defense Service (Satyalancana Dharma Nusa)
Medal for Active Duty in Indonesia's Outer Islands (Satyalancana Wira Nusa)	Medal for Active Duty as a Border Guard (Satyalancana Wira Dharma)	Social Welfare Medal (Satyalancana Kebaktian Sosial)

Military offices
Preceded by Andika Perkasa	Commander of the Indonesian National Armed Forces; 19 December 2022 − 22 November 2023	Succeeded by Agus Subiyanto
Preceded by Siwi Sukma Adji	Chief of Staff of the Indonesian Navy; 20 May 2020 – 28 December 2022	Succeeded by Muhammad Ali
