= Muhammad Ali (admiral) =

Indonesian admiral

Admiral Muhammad Ali
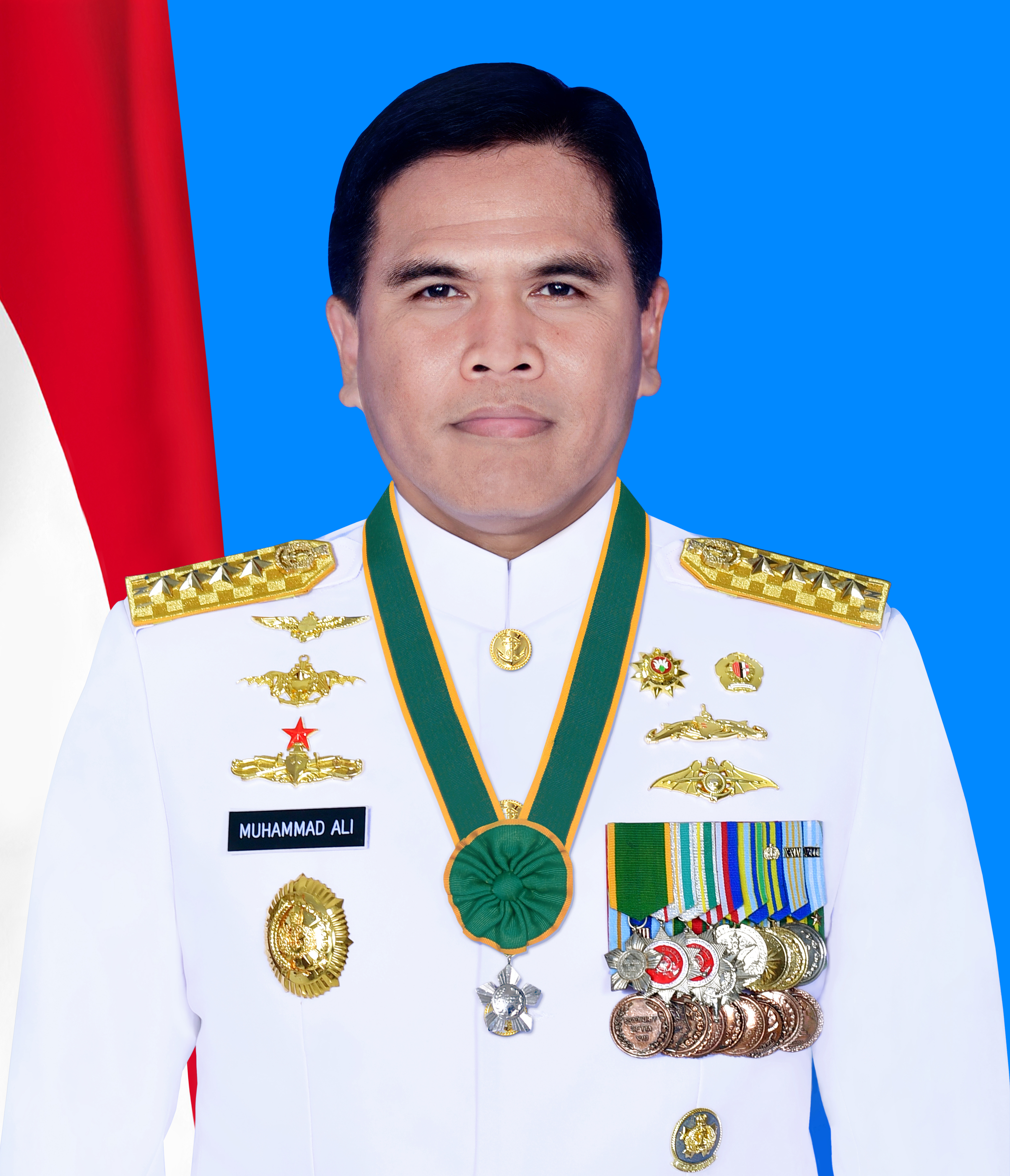

Chief of Staff of the Indonesian Navy
- Incumbent
- Assumed office 28 December 2022
- President: Joko Widodo; Prabowo Subianto
- Preceded by: Admiral Yudo Margono

Personal details
- Born: 9 April 1967 (age 59) Bandung, West Java, Indonesia

Military service
- Allegiance: Indonesia
- Branch/service: Indonesian Navy
- Years of service: 1990–present
- Rank: Admiral
- Unit: Fleet Forces

Muhammad Ali (born 9 April 1967) is an admiral in the Indonesian Navy, currently serving as the Chief of Staff of the Indonesian Navy since 28 December 2022. Throughout his career, Ali has occupied various significant roles. Notably, he served as an aide to the former Vice President of Indonesia, Boediono. Following this, he assumed positions such as Advisory Staff to Navy Chief of Staff, Governor of Naval Academy, Commander of 1st Fleet Command, Commander of 1st Joint Defence Command, and currently as the Chief of Staff of the Navy.

Military offices
Preceded by Yudo Margono	Chief of Staff of the Indonesian Navy; 28 December 2022 – present	Incumbent
