= KRI Silas Papare =

Parchim-class corvette

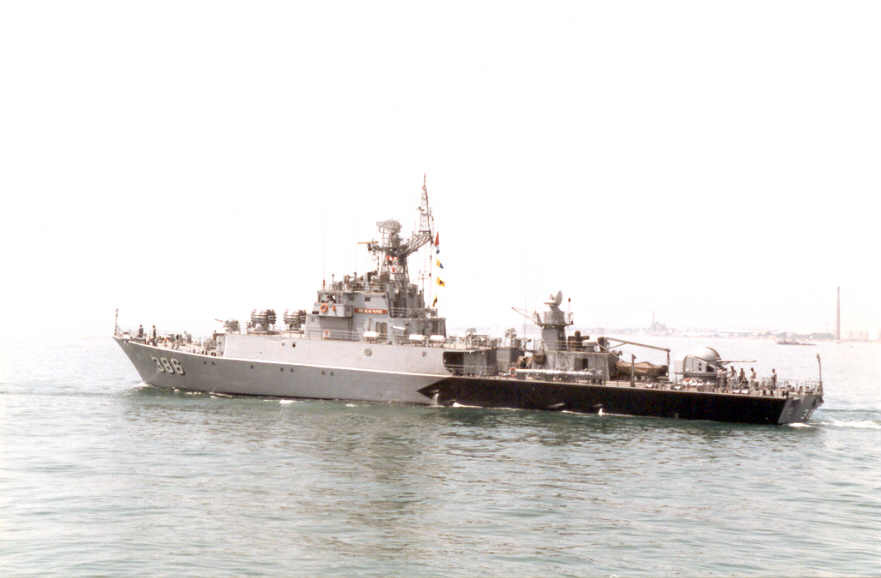
- KRI Silas Papare in Málaga

History

East Germany
- Name: Gadebusch
- Namesake: Gadebusch
- Builder: Peene-Werft, Wolgast
- Laid down: 17 August 1981
- Launched: 1982
- Commissioned: 31 August 1984
- Decommissioned: 2 October 1990
- Identification: Hull number: 211
- Fate: Integrated with unified German Navy, 3 October 1990

Germany
- Name: Gadebusch
- Namesake: Gadebusch
- Commissioned: 3 October 1990
- Decommissioned: 1991
- Identification: Hull number: P 6167
- Fate: Laid up 1991, sold to Indonesia

Indonesia
- Name: Silas Papare
- Namesake: Silas Papare
- Commissioned: 27 October 1996
- Home port: Surabaya
- Identification: Pennant number: 386
- Status: Active

General characteristics
- Type: Kapitan Patimura-class corvette
- Displacement: 865 tonnes (standard); 935 tonnes (fully loaded)
- Length: 75.2 m (247 ft)
- Beam: 9.78 m (32.1 ft)
- Draft: 2.65 m (8.7 ft)
- Propulsion: 3x4750 hp M-504A diesel (total 14.250 hp); 3 fixed pitch propellers; 1x500 kW diesel generator; 2x200 kW diesel generators
- Speed: 24.5 knots (45.4 km/h)
- Range: 2,100 nautical miles (4,000 km) at 14 knots (26 km/h)
- Complement: 62 crew
- Armament: as Gadebusch; 1 x twin 57 mm gun AK-725; 1 x twin 30 mm gun AK-230; 2 x SA-N-5 MANPAD positions; 2 x RBU-6000 ASW rocket launcher; 4 x 400 mm torpedo tubes; as KRI Silas Papare; 1 x twin 57 mm gun AK-725; 1 x twin 30 mm gun AK-230; 2 x 20 mm gun Denel GI-2; 2 x RBU-6000 ASW rocket launcher

KRI Silas Papare (386) is a Kapitan Patimura-class corvette currently operated by the Indonesian Navy. Before her service in Indonesia, ship was part of the East German Volksmarine, as Gadebusch (211).

== Specifications ==
The Parchim-class corvette was developed for the East German Navy in the late 1970s, and built by the Wolgast Peene-Werft. The ships were designed for coastal anti-submarine warfare. In case of an all-out NATO-Warsaw Pact war in Europe their prime targets would have been the small U-206 coastal submarines of the West German navy. The first ship, Wismar (now the Indonesian KRI Sutanto), was launched on 9 April 1981 in Rostock, and subsequently another 15 ships were built until 1986. To make production more economical, the Soviet Union agreed to purchase another 12 ships from Wolgaster Peenewerft built between 1986 and 1990, thereby effectively subsidising the East German shipbuilding industry.

The ships of the Soviet Navy were named Parchim II by NATO. Though useful as a coastal ASW platform, the Soviet production of the similar but far more powerful Grisha class made this purchase even more illogical for the Soviet Navy. After German re-unification the former East German ships were sold to the TNI-AL (Indonesian Navy) in 1993. The Indonesian Navy extensively refurbished their Parchims, to the point where the refurbishing exceeded the cost of purchase. They are still in service, both in the Indonesian Navy and in the Russian Baltic Fleet.

Indonesian Parchims have completed a major refit to fulfill Indonesian Navy needs. The one twin 57 mm gun AK-725 and one twin 30 mm gun AK-230 were retained. The RBU-6000 also retained as a major armament. Two SA-N-5 SAM removed and replaced by two Vektor G12 20mm gun. Four 400mm Russian-made torpedo launcher was out of service because there is no Russian made torpedo in Indonesian Navy inventory so this Russian made torpedo launcher replaced by two western made triple torpedo launcher but only for two ships.

== Service history ==
Gadebusch was laid down on 17 August 1981 by Peene-Werft, Wolgast and launched in 1982. She was commissioned on 31 August 1984. Following the end of the Cold War and the reunification of Germany, Gadebusch was formally decommissioned by Volksmarine on 2 October 1990 and integrated with the unified German Navy on 3 October. Gadebusch was assigned hull number P 6167 during its brief service in the German Navy and later was laid up in 1991.

The ship was sold to the Indonesian Navy in 1996, alongside 15 other Kapitan Patimura-class corvettes and 23 other vessels in a US$12.7 million deal. She was renamed Silas Papare and was commissioned on 27 October 1996, following modifications.
