= KRI Spica =

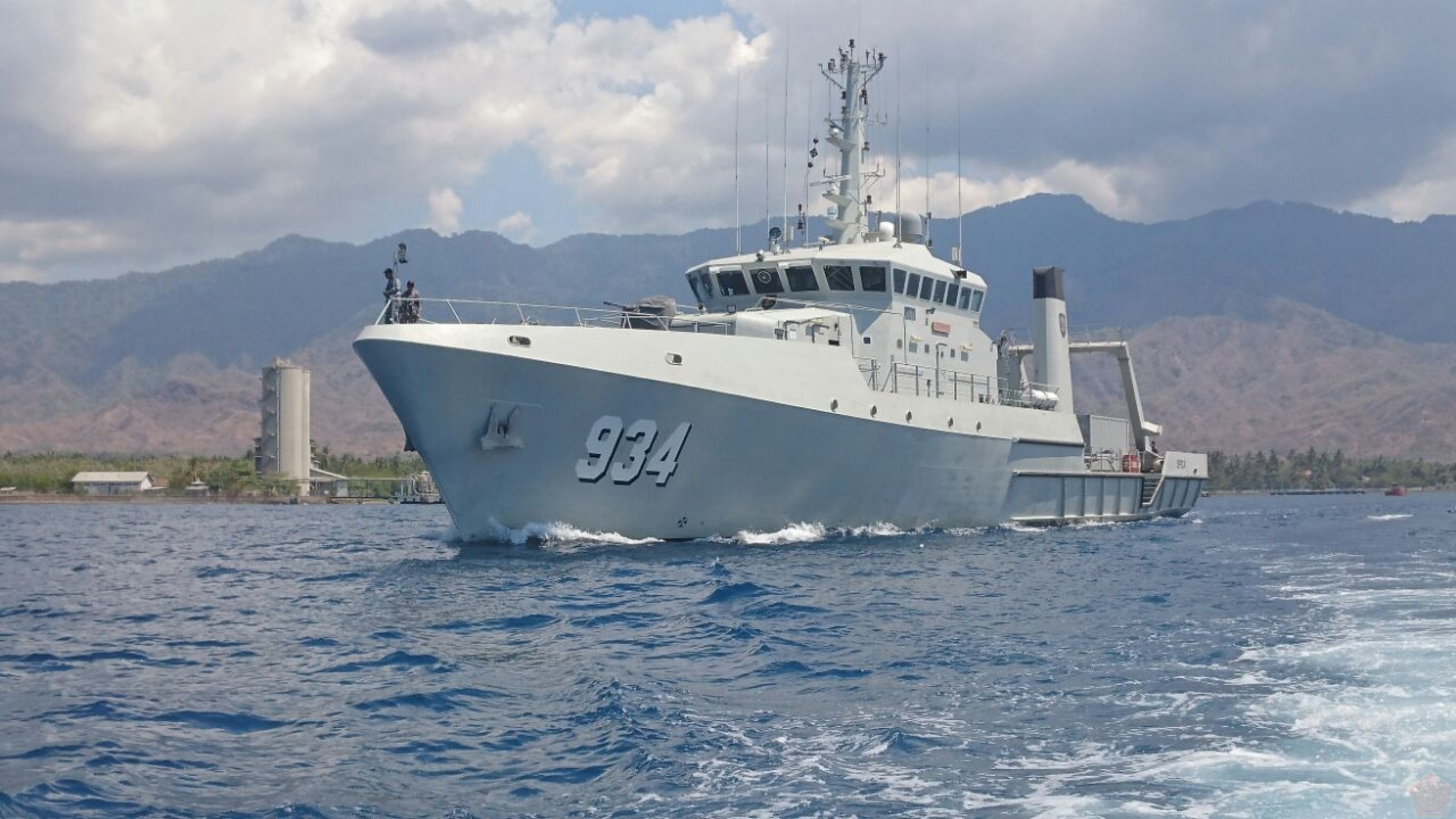
- KRI Spica (934)

Class overview
- Name: Rigel-class
- Builders: OCEA Shipbuilding, France
- Operators: Indonesian Navy
- Planned: 2
- Completed: 2
- Active: 2

Indonesia
- Name: KRI Spica
- Namesake: Spica
- Ordered: 1 August 2012
- Builder: OCEA, Les Sables-d'Olonne, France
- Launched: 3 August 2015
- Commissioned: 17 October 2015
- Identification: Pennant number: 934
- Status: In service

General characteristics as built
- Class & type: MPRV (Multi Purpose Research Vessel)
- Displacement: 523 t (515 long tons) standard
- Length: 60.1 m (197 ft 2 in)
- Draught: 4.9 m (16 ft 1 in)
- Propulsion: 2x MTU 8V 4000 M53 diesel engines; 2x fixed pitch propeller
- Speed: 14 kn (26 km/h) maximum
- Range: 4,400 nmi (8,100 km) at 12 kn (22 km/h)
- Complement: 46
- Armament: 1 x Denel Land Systems GI-2 20 mm canon; 2 x 12.7mm machine guns

KRI Spica (934) is the second hydro oceanographic auxiliary ship belonging to the Indonesian Navy which was built at the OCEA shipyard, Les Sables-d'Olonne, France, after her sister ship KRI Rigel (933) was completed. Spica is taken from the name of the brightest star in the constellation Virgo.
