= KRI Sultan Thaha Syaifuddin =

Parchim-class corvette

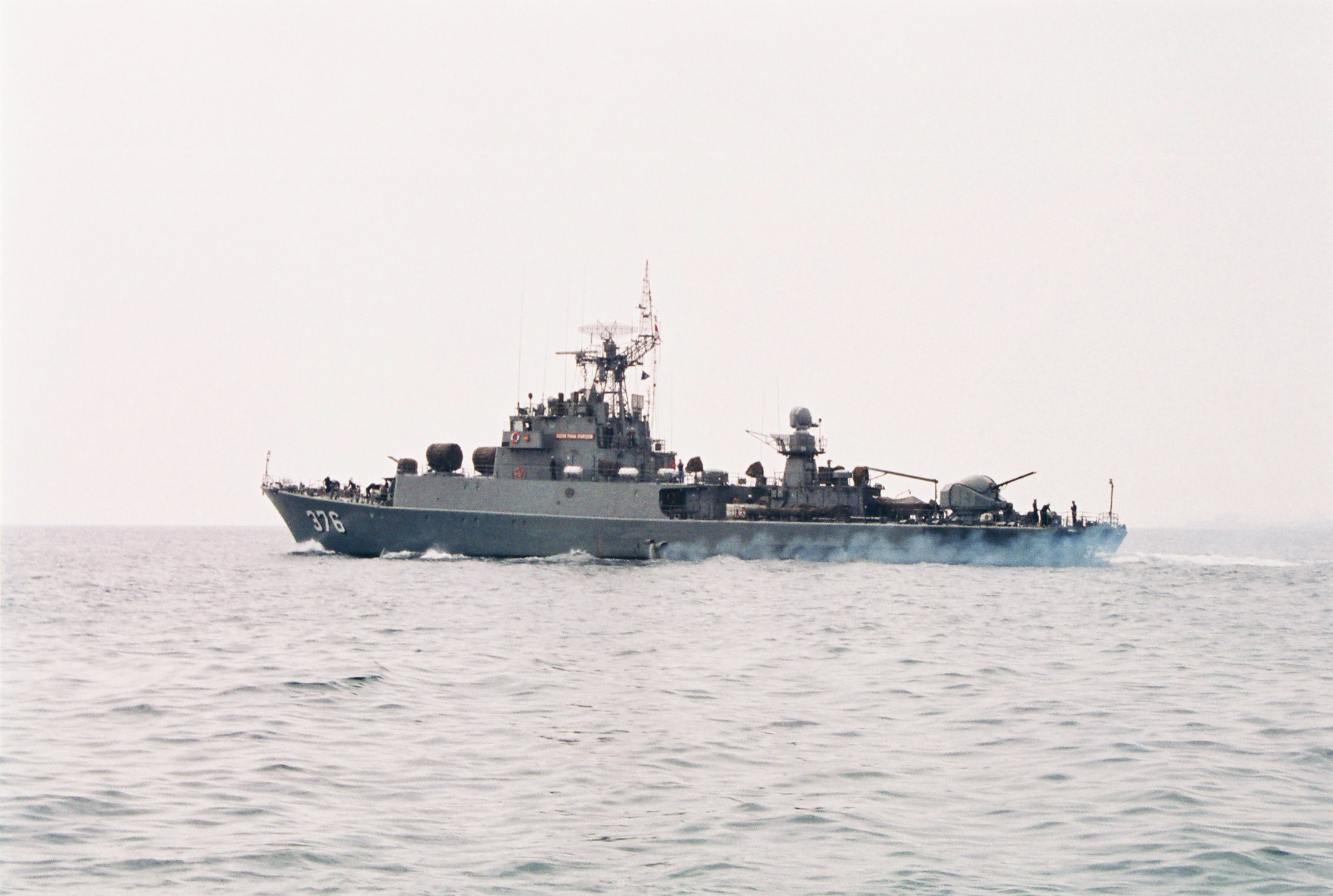
- KRI Sultan Thaha Syaifuddin on 14 March 1994

History

East Germany
- Name: Bad Doberan
- Namesake: Bad Doberan
- Builder: Peene-Werft, Wolgast
- Commissioned: 30 June 1982
- Decommissioned: 1994
- Identification: Pennant number: 222
- Fate: Sold to Indonesian Navy

Indonesia
- Name: Sultan Thaha Syaifuddin
- Namesake: Sultan Thaha Syaifuddin
- Commissioned: 25 February 1995
- Home port: Surabaya
- Identification: MMSI number: 525882601; Callsign: PKOU; Pennant number: 376
- Status: Active

General characteristics
- Type: Kapitan Patimura-class corvette
- Displacement: 865 tonnes (standard); 935 tonnes (fully loaded)
- Length: 75.2 m (247 ft)
- Beam: 9.78 m (32.1 ft)
- Draft: 2.65 m (8.7 ft)
- Propulsion: 3x4750 hp M-504A diesel (total 14.250 hp); 3 fixed pitch propellers; 1x500 kW diesel generator; 2x200 kW diesel generators
- Speed: 24.5 knots (45.4 km/h)
- Range: 2,100 nautical miles (4,000 km) at 14 knots (26 km/h)
- Complement: 62 crew
- Armament: as Bad Doberan; 1 x twin 57 mm gun AK-725; 1 x twin 30 mm gun AK-230; 2 x SA-N-5 MANPAD positions; 2 x RBU-6000 ASW rocket launcher; 4 x 400 mm torpedo tubes; as KRI Sultan Thaha Syaifuddin; 1 x twin 57 mm gun AK-725; 1 x single 30 mm gun Type 730 CIWS; 2 x 20 mm gun Denel GI-2; 2 x RBU-6000 ASW rocket launcher

KRI Sultan Thaha Syaifuddin (376) is a Kapitan Patimura-class corvette currently operated by the Indonesian Navy. Before her service in Indonesia, the ship was part of the East German Volksmarine, as Bad Doberan (222).

== Specifications ==
The Parchim-class corvette was developed for the East German Navy in the late 1970s, and built by the Wolgast Peene-Werft - being commissioned on June 30th 1982. The ships were designed for coastal anti-submarine warfare. In the event of an all-out NATO-Warsaw Pact war in Europe, their primary targets would have been the small U-206 coastal submarines of the West German navy. The first ship, Wismar (now the Indonesian KRI Sutanto), was launched on 9 April 1981 in Rostock, and subsequently another 15 ships were built until 1986. To make production more economical, the Soviet Union agreed to purchase another 12 ships from Wolgaster Peenewerft built between 1986 and 1990, thereby effectively subsidising the East German shipbuilding industry.

The ships of the Soviet Navy were named Parchim II by NATO. Though useful as a coastal ASW platform, the Soviet production of the similar but far more powerful Grisha class made this purchase even more illogical for the Soviet Navy. After German re-unification the former East German ships were sold to the TNI-AL (Indonesian Navy) in 1993. The Indonesian Navy extensively refurbished their Parchims, to the point where the refurbishing exceeded the cost of purchase. They are still in service, both in the Indonesian Navy and in the Russian Baltic Fleet.

Indonesian Parchims have completed a major refit to fulfill Indonesian Navy needs. The one twin 57 mm gun AK-725 and one twin 30 mm gun AK-230 were retained except for KRI Sultan Thaha Syaifuddin where the 30mm AK-230 replaced by Chinese made Type 730 CIWS. The RBU-6000 also retained as a major armament. Two SA-N-5 SAM removed and replaced by two Vektor G12 20mm gun. Four 400mm Russian-made torpedo launcher was out of service because there is no Russian made torpedo in Indonesian Navy inventory so this Russian made torpedo launcher replaced by two western made triple torpedo launcher but only for two ships.

== Service history ==
Bad Doberan was built by Peene-Werft, Wolgast, and was commissioned on 30 June 1982. Following the end of the Cold War and the reunification of Germany, Bad Doberan was sold to the Indonesian Navy in 1994, alongside 15 other Kapitan Patimura-class corvettes and 23 other vessels in a US$12.7 million deal. She was renamed Sultan Thaha Syaifuddin and was commissioned on 25 February 1995, following modifications.
