= Clurit-class fast attack craft =

Class of attack craft

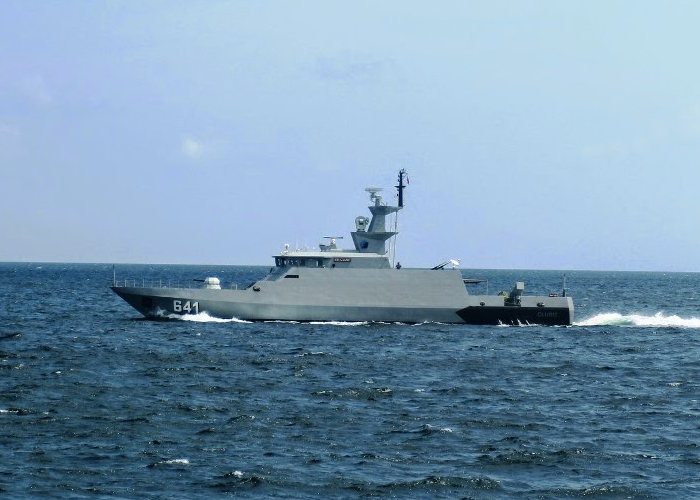
- KRI Clurit

Class overview
- Builders: PT Palindo Marine; PT Citra Shipyard
- Operators: Indonesian Navy
- Preceded by: Mandau class
- Succeeded by: Sampari class
- Cost: US$ 5 million in 2018 (per ship)
- Planned: 8
- Completed: 8
- Active: 8

General characteristics
- Class & type: Missile boat
- Displacement: 250 tons
- Length: 44 m (144 ft 4 in)
- Beam: 8 m (26 ft 3 in)
- Propulsion: 3 × MAN V12 total power 1.800hp
- Speed: 30 knots (56 km/h; 35 mph)
- Complement: 35
- Sensors & processing systems: H/ZKT-series Combat Management System; Z-Power Management 80 Range; SR-47AG Searching Radar; EID ICCS internal communications systems
- Armament: 1 × 30mm NG-18 CIWS; 1 × 30mm Marlin-WS 30; 1 × 30mm MSI-DS LW A1; 2 × 12.7mm M2 Browning; 2 × C-705 AShM

The Clurit class are a class of domestically designed and built fast attack craft operated by the Indonesian Navy. Vessels of this class are named after indigenous weapons and swords used in Indonesia.

== History ==
The Clurit class was built by PT Palindo Marine Shipyard, Tanjunguncang, Batam. The Clurit is named after a curved blade weapon native to the Madurese people of East Java.

Another ship with the same specifications was commissioned by the Indonesian Navy in February 2012, named KRI Kujang 642. Two more had been commissioned by the end of 2013, with a total of nine planned by the end of 2014. Three of the new vessels are being constructed by PT Palindo Marine Shipyard, with nearby PT Citra Shipyard working on the fourth.

== Design ==
The Clurit prioritizes the element of surprise, rapid strike, destroying multiple targets at once and avoidance. She has a crew of 35.

The first four of the class were originally armed with just a Denel (Vektor) 20mm cannon and two 12.7 mm machine guns. In May 2014 the Clurit and Kujang were fitted with a Chinese made six-barrelled NG-18 30mm CIWS and two of the new C-705 SSM, although Jane's states that they can each carry four such missiles. Indonesia hopes to licence-build the C-705, which is a derivative of the Chinese C-704 anti-shipping missile with a turbojet to extend the range to 120 kilometres (65 nmi). Although the first C-705 have been fitted, it is not clear when they will become operational.

== Ships of class ==
Number	Pennant Number	Name	Builder	Launched	Commissioned	Remarks
1	641	Clurit	PT Palindo, Batam, Indonesia		25-Apr-2011	Clurit or sickle, a curved bladed weapon found commonly in Madura.
2	642	Kujang	PT Palindo, Batam, Indonesia		16-Feb-2012	Kujang, a bladed weapon native to the Sundanese people of Western Java.
3	643	Beladau	PT Palindo, Batam, Indonesia		25-Jan-2013	Beladau or dagger, a common weapon found in the Sumatra region.
4	644	Alamang	PT Palindo, Batam, Indonesia		20-Dec-2013	Alamang, a sword or cutlass used by the Bugis and Makassarese people in the Sulawesi region.
5	645	Surik	PT Citra, Batam, Indonesia		27-Sep-2014	Surik, a traditional sword from Timor.
6	646	Siwar	PT Citra, Batam, Indonesia		27-Sep-2014	Siwar, a traditional knife.
7	647	Parang	PT Citra, Batam, Indonesia		27-Sep-2014	Parang, a long knife typically used as a machete.
8	648	Terapang	PT Citra, Batam, Indonesia		27-Sep-2014	Terapang, a kris made of precious metals such as gold or silver.

== See also ==
- Celurit or Clurit
