= KRI Kujang =

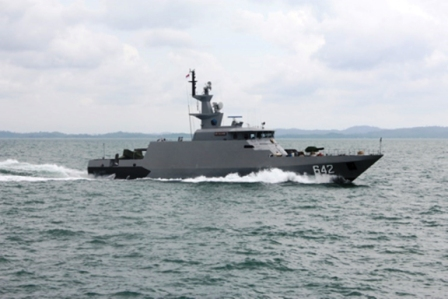

History

Indonesia
- Name: KRI Kujang
- Namesake: Kujang (weapon)
- Awarded: PT Palindo Marine
- Commissioned: 16 February 2012
- Identification: 642

General characteristics
- Class & type: Clurit-class fast attack craft
- Displacement: 250 tonnes
- Length: 44 m
- Beam: 7.4 m
- Speed: 30 knots (56 km/h) (max)

KRI Kujang (642) is a Clurit-class fast attack craft of the Indonesian Navy.

== Characteristics ==
The vessel has a length of 44 meters, a draft of 7.4 meters, and a maximum speed of 30 knots. She has a crew complement of 35, and is equipped with C-705 missiles, a 20mm Denel Vektor GI-2 main gun, and was later fitted with the AK-630 CIWS.

== Service history ==
Kujang was built by PT Palindo Marine based in Batam, as part of an order for four similar ships. She contained around 45 percent locally manufactured parts, and costed around US$ 8 million. She was commissioned on 16 February 2012 as the second ship of her class (after Clurit), and was assigned to the Western Fleet Command (Koarmabar).
