= Indonesian Fleet Command =

Fleet Command of the Republic of Indonesia
- Komando Armada Republik Indonesia
- Indonesian Fleet Command Emblem
- Founded: 5 December 1945; 80 years ago
- Country: Indonesia
- Branch: Indonesian Navy
- Type: Naval Battle Fleet
- Role: Naval Warfare
- Size: 3 Fleet Commands
- Part of: Indonesian National Armed Forces
- Headquarters: Jakarta
- Mottos: Ekapada Banda Jala Nusa (Sanskrit, lit. 'Uniting the Nusantara's Sea Powers')
- Anniversaries: 5 December
- Engagements: Indonesian National Revolution; Operation Trikora
- Website: tnial.mil.id

Commanders
- Commander: Vice Admiral Herru Kusmanto
- Chief of Staff: Rear Admiral Didong Rio Duto Purwo Kuntjoro
- Inspector: Rear Admiral Lower Half Budi Siswanto
- Head of the Expert Staff Group: Rear Admiral Lower Half Gatot Hariyanto

Indonesian Fleet Command (Indonesian: Komando Armada Republik Indonesia, lit. 'Fleet Command of the Republic of Indonesia') is a naval combat force of the Indonesian Navy (TNI-AL), it was formed and inaugurated by the Commander of the National Armed Forces Gen. Andika Perkasa on 21 January 2022. The Fleet Command consists of three fleets, namely: 1st Fleet Command located in Tanjungpinang, 2nd Fleet Command located in Surabaya and 3rd Fleet Command located in Sorong. The Indonesian Fleet Command Headquarters is located on Jl Gunung Sahari No. 67 Central Jakarta, Jakarta.

== History ==
The Indonesian fleet as a naval combat force, was essentially born and grew with the birth of the INAF in October 1945 - all on the basis of the naval units of the People's Security Agency. The Indonesian fleet has never been absent in efforts to uphold and defend the sovereignty of the Nation.

During the National Revolution, the young Indonesian National Armed Forces, thru the Navy, had succeeded in carrying out various sea operations, including breaking the Dutch naval blockade, cross-sea expeditions in the context of sending soldiers and NCOs to far-flung area and igniting the spirit of struggle in various areas outside the islands of Java and Sumatra. The National Revolution proved to be the baptism of fire of the young naval branch and its then small fleet.

=== Guided Democracy - foundation ===
After many fruitful years, the Navy's growing fleet of Western naval assets, now battle tested in the twin campaigns of 1958–60 against both Permesta and the Revolutionary Government of the Republic of Indonesia, needed to adapt to the changing times. Sukarno's Guided Democracy program, began 1959, now set upon an era of massive reforms in the Armed Forces, the Navy included.

Based on the Decree of the Chief of Staff of the Navy (Kasal) No. A.4/2/10 dated 14 September 1959, the organization of the Indonesian Navy National Fleet Command was established. On December 5, 1959, the Chief of Staff of the Indonesian Navy, Commodore R.E. Martadinata, was present in the ceremony formalizing the establishment of the Indonesian Fleet Command and with it was the presentation of its Colour. The formation of the Fleet is a very important event in spurring the realization of a strong modern Indonesian Navy. Looking at the inauguration in 1959, as the momentum for modernizing the strength of the Navy that has been achieved over the years and the strength of the Navy has fulfilled all the elements of strength as an Integrated Fleet Weapon System (SSAT) consisting of surface vessels, submarines, naval aircraft, landing forces of Marines and amphibious craft, and naval base elements stationed all over Indonesia.

These elements, reinforced by a steady supply of Soviet and Warsaw Pact materiel to the Navy, enabled the National Fleet to engage as the main maritime element of Operation Trikora and the Indonesia-Malaysia confrontation in the 1960s.

In 1961 the Military Sealift Command was created as a separate organization on the basis of the heavy landing and amphibious assets of the Fleet.

Decree of the Chief of Staff of the Navy No. 5401.7 dated February 18, 1963 concerning the Organization of the Ministry of the Navy under the Coordinating Ministry of Defense and Security, stated that in the context of consolidating and perfecting the organization of the Navy at large, it was necessary to make any organizational changes. The Indonesian Fleet Command Organization based on the Decree of the Chief of Staff/Minister of the Navy No. 5401.35 dated 6 August 1963 felt the need to be reorganized in order to adjust to the development of conditions and administrative and operational needs. For the implementation of the reorganization of the Fleet Command, the Commander's instructions were issued via telegram No. 170256/July 1963 regarding the implementation of the reorganization of the Indonesian Fleet Command.

As a continuation of the telegram, the Decree of the Minister of the Navy/Chief of Staff NO. 5401.48 dated December 1, 1963 regarding the National Fleet Command (Koarma RI). It was envisioned to be a functional and administrative Principal Combatant Command (Kotama) which is a directly reporting unit under the supervision of the office of the Vice Chief of Staff/Deputy Minister of the Navy. The main task of the Koarma is to organize administrative commands and coordinate the fleet component formations (Komando Jenis Koarma, Konjen) in order to prepare the combat readiness of each type of unit and to organize the Operational Command for the Fleet Ready Reserves Command (Koarsa) in order to enhance and maintain the combat operational readiness of the naval reserve fleet and its assigned vessels. This was to help prepare for any naval operation as may be ordered by Navy Headquarters at home or overseas.

=== Era of the New Order ===
On December 5, 1966, Koarma was split into two: the Ocean Fleet Forces Command (Koarsam) and Archipelago Fleet (Koartar). Koarsam is the Strategic Force of the Indonesian Navy in supporting the primary missions of the navy and the larger National Armed Forces, while Koartar is a regional force whose task is territorial defense against internal aggression and assistance in national security at home. Then based on KSAL Instruction No. 5401.15 of 1970 dated March 11, 1970, the two fleet commands were merged again to the Indonesian Fleet. In carrying out their duties, on the basis of the two commands the Indonesian Fleet was split into two - West Squadron (Eskabar) and the East Squadron (Eskatim).

In 1979 the two Squadrons, due to the retirement of older vessels and those of Warsaw Pact manufacture as well as the slow arrival of new Western-made naval craft, were merged into the National Fleet and its operational force, the Nusantara Fleet. Then based on the Decrree of the Commander of the Armed Forces Number Kep/09/P/III/1984 concerning the Principles of Organization and Procedures of the Indonesian Navy, the Indonesian Fleet was divided accordingly once more into two fleet commands, the Western Fleet Command (Koarmabar) and the Eastern Fleet Command (Koarmatim). This is a follow-up to the enactment of Law No. 20 of 1982 concerning the Basics of National Defense, where the functional tasks between the Ministry of Defense and Security and Armed Forces of the Republic were split. The renewed division of the fleet was made possible by an increased defense budget in the 80s, enabling the Navy to acquire more modern naval assets and equipment from the West while supporting a now growing local defense industry.

Based on the decree no. Skep/4033/XI/1987 dated November 17, 1987, the Navy formally set the birthday of the Indonesian Fleet as December 5, 1959, and hereinafter that day would be annually marked as the Naval Fleet Day of the Republic of Indonesia.

In 2018, the Fleets were renumbered the 1st and 2nd Fleets, and the 3rd Fleet was established. The three fleets were to serve in regional lines, assisting in maritime defense of western, central, and eastern Indonesia, respectively.

=== Reformation in the 21st Century ===
In 2018–19, the Navy, following in the footsteps of other global naval forces, created the Fleet Marine Force (Satuan Marinir Komando Armada) to serve as the expeditionary oceangoing force of the Marine Corps and to help the Navy prepare for force projection and expeditionary combat operations abroad.

After 37 years, the presidency of Joko Widodo, thru the office of Minister of Defense Prabowo Subianto, mandated the Navy to officially reactivate the Indonesian National Fleet Forces, this time, as a principal Operational Command operationally responsible for national maritime security and defense operations and contributing overseas peacekeeping and with administrative control over the regional Fleets.

Vice Admiral Agung Prasetiawan was inaugurated as the first Commander of the reactivated Indonesian Fleet Command, at the 1st Fleet Command Docks at Pondok Dayung, Tanjung Priok, on Thursday, 3 February 2022 in a public ceremony presided by the Chief of Staff of the Navy, Admiral Yudo Margono. On that day, the renewed colour of the Navy Fleet Command, which has the motto Ekapada Banda Jala Nusa which means Uniting the Powers of the Archipelagic Seas, was presented in the ceremony, symbolizing the rebirth of the Indonesian National Fleet.

=== Territorial history ===
In 1985, the division of the National Fleet Command also led to the then Naval Regions (Komando Daerah Angkatan Laut, Kodaeral) being now directly reporting units of the Fleets - as Main Naval Bases (MNB, Lantamal), and Naval Bases (NBs, Lanal).

Before the reorganization, the Naval Regions, created in 1950 as Maritime Regions (Komando Daerah Maritim) were responsible under the office of the Chief of Staff of the Navy to administer maritime defense affairs along regional lines, acting as equivalent to the US Naval Regions. These naval regions, as a general rule following Japanese precedence, had regional patrol fleets under their direct supervision with the National Fleet supervising any major surface combatants or submarines forward deployed within the regions, a practice that continues on till today in the Naval Regions themselves.

Following the reorganization, the Western and Eastern Fleets were organized territorially into:

- under the Western Fleet:
  - Main Naval Base I Belawan (Northern Sumatra Mainland and Maritime)
    - created on the basis of the 1st Naval Region Northern Sumatra and 2nd Naval Region Southern Sumatra
  - Main Naval Base II North Jakarta (Southern Sumatra, Western Kalimantan and Western Java)
    - created on the basis of the 3rd Naval Region Western Java and parts of the 5th Naval Region Borneo and 2nd Naval Region Southern Sumatra
- under the Eastern Fleet:
  - Main Naval Base III Surabaya (Eastern Java and Eastern Kalimantan)
    - created on the basis of the 4th Naval Region Eastern Java and parts of the 5th Naval Region Borneo
  - Main Naval Base IV Bitung (Sulawesi, Bali and Lesser Sundas)
    - created on the basis of the 6th and 7th Naval Regions (Northern and Southern Celebes) and the 8th Naval Region Lesser Sundas
  - Main Naval Base V Jayapura (Maluku and Papua)
    - created on the basis of the 9th Naval Region Maluku Islands and 10th Naval Region Papua

Each MNB was organized in like manner with naval bases, air stations and maintenance shipyards under base commanders. The Naval Bases - formerly Naval Station Commands (NSCs, Kosetal/Kosionudal (Komando Station Angkatan Laut)) - have had served as regional bases in support of operations of the Fleets and the wider mission of the Navy over the decades.

In 2025, all MNB were reinstated as Naval Regions, which report to their respective Fleet Commands.

== Organization ==
=== Fleet Commands ===
The force is divided into 3 Fleet Commands namely, (1st Fleet Command) in Tanjungpinang, Riau Islands, (2nd Fleet Command) in Surabaya, East Java and (3rd Fleet Command) in Sorong, West Papua, each led by a Fleet Commander with the rank of two-star admiral (Rear Admiral).

| Emblems | Commands | Established | Headquarters | Subordinate Commands |
|---|---|---|---|---|
| | 1st Fleet Command | 30 March 1985 | Tanjung Pinang, Riau Islands | 1st Fleet Sea Security Group; 1st Fleet Sea Combat Group; 1st Fleet Submarine Force; 1st Fleet Escort Force; 1st Fleet Fast Craft Force; 1st Fleet Minehunter Force; 1st Fleet Amphibious Ship Force; 1st Fleet Auxiliary Ship Force; 1st Fleet Frogman Force; 1st Fleet Marine Force; 1st Fleet Air Force; 1st Fleet Divers and Underwater Rescue Command; 1st Fleet Training Command; 1st Fleet Military Police Command |
| | 2nd Fleet Command | 30 March 1985 | Surabaya, East Java | 2nd Fleet Sea Security Group; 2nd Fleet Sea Combat Group; 2nd Fleet Submarine Force; 2nd Fleet Escort Force; 2nd Fleet Fast Craft Force; 2nd Fleet Minehunter Force; 2nd Fleet Amphibious Ship Force; 2nd Fleet Auxiliary Ship Force; 2nd Fleet Frogman Force; 2nd Fleet Marine Force; 2nd Fleet Air Force; 2nd Fleet Divers and Underwater Rescue Command; 2nd Fleet Training Command; 2nd Fleet Military Police Command |
| | 3rd Fleet Command | 11 May 2018 | Sorong, Southwest Papua | 3rd Fleet Sea Security Group; 3rd Fleet Sea Combat Group; 3rd Fleet Submarine Force; 3rd Fleet Escort Force; 3rd Fleet Fast Craft Force; 3rd Fleet Minehunter Force; 3rd Fleet Amphibious Ship Force; 3rd Fleet Auxiliary Ship Force; 3rd Fleet Frogman Force; 3rd Fleet Marine Force; 3rd Fleet Air Force; 3rd Fleet Divers and Underwater Rescue Command; 3rd Fleet Training Command; 3rd Fleet Military Police Command |

=== Naval Region Commands ===
Under the Naval Regions framework are the following subordinated institutions that report to the naval regional commander, a flag officer holding the rank of Rear Admiral or Major General (Marine Corps):

- Naval Bases (Type A), commanded by a Colonel (Navy / Marine Corps)
- Naval Bases (Type B), commanded by a Lieutenant Colonel (Navy / Marine Corps)
- Naval Bases (Type C), commanded by a Major (Navy / Marine Corps)
- Naval Stations
  - Naval Stations Type A, commanded by a Captain (Navy / Marine Corps)
  - Naval Stations Type B, commanded by a First Lieutenant (Navy / Marine Corps)
  - Naval Stations Type C, commanded by a Second Lieutenant (Navy / Marine Corps)
- Naval Maintenance and Repair Facilities, with similar organization as in regular naval bases
- Naval Air Stations, with similar organization as in regular naval bases, but report to the Naval Aviation Center

The Naval Region organization additionally contains a naval security unit and one naval police battalion (until 2026, one Marine Corps base defense battalion was also assigned to the Naval Regions). This is in addition to a naval regional patrol flotilla which is responsible to the regional commander.

Naval Bases are organized territorially into:

- Naval Outposts
- Naval Security Outposts
- Naval-Maritime Potential Security Sections (Babinpotmar, led by Petty Officers ranking Corporal/Petty Officer 2nd class and above)

| Naval Regions (Main Naval Bases until 2025) | Naval Bases | Naval Air Station | Maintenance and Repair Facility |
|---|---|---|---|
| I Naval Region Command Belawan, North Sumatera | Sabang Naval Base; Simeulue Naval Base; Lhokseumawe Naval Base; Tanjung Balai Asahan Naval Base; Dumai Naval Base | Sabang Naval Air Station | Sabang Maintenance and Repair Facility; Belawan Maintenance and Repair Facility |
| II Naval Region Command Padang, West Sumatera | Sibolga Naval Base; Nias Naval Base; Bengkulu Naval Base | | |
| III Naval Region Command North Jakarta, Jakarta | Palembang Naval Base; Bangka Belitung Naval Base; Lampung Naval Base; Banten Naval Base; Bandung Naval Base; Cirebon Lanal Naval Base | Jakarta Naval Air Station | Jakarta Maintenance and Repair Facility; Pondok Dayung Maintenance and Repair Facility |
| IV Naval Region Command Tanjung Pinang, Riau Islands | Bintan Naval Base; Tanjung Balai Karimun Naval Base; Dabo Singkep Naval Base; Tarempa Naval Base; Ranai Naval Base | Tanjungpinang Naval Air Station | Mentigi Maintenance and Repair Facility |
| V Naval Region Command Surabaya, East Java | Semarang Naval Base; Cilacap Naval Base; Tegal Naval Base; Batuporon Naval Base; Yogyakarta Naval Base; Malang Naval Base; Banyuwangi Naval Base; Denpasar Naval Base | Juanda Naval Air Station | Surabaya Maintenance and Repair Facility |
| VI Naval Region Command Makassar, South Sulawesi | Palu Naval Base; Mamuju Naval Base; Kendari Naval Base | | Makassar Maintenance and Repair Facility |
| VII Naval Region Command Kupang, East Nusa Tenggara | Mataram Naval Base; Rote Island Naval Base; Maumere Naval Base; Labuan Bajo Naval Base; Waingapu Naval Base | Kupang Naval Air Station | |
| VIII Naval Region Command Manado, North Sulawesi | Melonguane Naval Base; Tahuna Naval Base; Gorontalo Naval Base; Tolitoli Naval Base | Manado Naval Air Station | |
| IX Naval Region Command Ambon, Maluku | Saumlaki Naval Base; Tual Naval Base | Aru Naval Air Station | Ambon Maintenance and Repair Facility |
| X Naval Region Command Jayapura, Papua | Biak Naval Base | Biak Naval Air Station | Manokwari Maintenance and Repair Facility |
| XI Naval Region Command Merauke, South Papua | Timika Naval Base; Merauke Naval Base | | |
| XII Naval Region Command Pontianak, West Kalimantan | Pangkalan Bun Naval Base; Ketapang Naval Base; Sambas Naval Base | | |
| XIII Naval Region Command Tarakan, North Kalimantan | Nunukan Naval Base; Sangatta Naval Base; Balikpapan Naval Base; Kota Baru Naval Base; Banjarmasin Naval Base | | |
| XIV Naval Region Command Sorong, Southwest Papua | Morotai Naval Base; Ternate Naval Base | | |

=== Administrative and Operational organization ===
Each subordinate fleet is organized into regional flottilas that operationally report to the nominal fleet group during contingencies.

| Emblems | Units | Subordinate Units |
Administrative Units
| | Fleet Submarine Forces | 1st Fleet Command Submarine Unit; 2nd Fleet Command Submarine Unit; 3rd Fleet Command Submarine Unit |
| | Fleet Escort Ship Forces | 1st Fleet Command Escort Unit; 2nd Fleet Command Escort Unit; 3rd Fleet Command Escort Unit |
| | Fleet Fast Craft Forces | 1st Fleet Command Fast Craft Unit; 2nd Fleet Command Fast Craft Unit; 3rd Fleet Command Fast Craft Unit |
| | Fleet Minehunter Ship Forces | 1st Fleet Command Minehunter Unit; 2nd Fleet Command Minehunter Unit; 3rd Fleet Command Minehunter Unit |
| | Fleet Auxiliary Ship Forces | 1st Fleet Command Auxiliary Unit; 2nd Fleet Command Auxiliary Unit; 3rd Fleet Command Auxiliary Unit |
| | Fleet Amphibious Ship Forces | 1st Fleet Command Amphibious Unit; 2nd Fleet Command Amphibious Unit; 3rd Fleet Command Amphibious Unit |
| | Fleet Frogman Forces | 1st Fleet Command Frogman Unit; 2nd Fleet Command Frogman Unit; 3rd Fleet Command Frogman Unit |
| | Fleet Air Forces | 1st Fleet Command Air Unit; 2nd Fleet Command Air Unit; 3rd Fleet Command Air Unit |
| | Fleet Marine Force | 1st Fleet Command Marine Unit; 2nd Fleet Command Marine Unit; 3rd Fleet Command Marine Unit |
Operational Commands
| | Fleet Training Command | 1st Fleet Training Command; 2nd Fleet Training Command; 3rd Fleet Training Command |
| | Fleet Military Police Command | 1st Fleet Military Police Command; 2nd Fleet Military Police Command; 3rd Fleet Military Police Command |
| | Underwater Rescue and Divers Command | 1st Fleet Command Underwater Rescue and Divers Unit; 2nd Fleet Command Underwater Rescue and Divers Unit; 3rd Fleet Command Underwater Rescue and Divers Unit |
Operational Groups
| | Fleet Naval Security Group | 1st Fleet Naval Security Group; 2nd Fleet Naval Security Group; 3rd Fleet Naval Security Group |
| | Fleet Naval Combat Group | 1st Fleet Naval Combat Group; 2nd Fleet Naval Combat Group; 3rd Fleet Naval Combat Group |

== See also ==
- Naval warfare
- Indonesian Marine Corps
- Military Sealift Command (Indonesia)
