= Baret =

Baret is a surname. Notable people with the surname include:

- Jeanne Baret (1740–1807), French explorer, naturalist, and botanist
- Thomas Baret (died 1396), English member of parliament (MP) for Oxford and spicer
- Richard Baret (died 1401), English politician
- William Baret, English MP for Gloucester

== See also ==
- Beret
