= KRI Alamang =

Indonesian Clurit-class fast attack craft

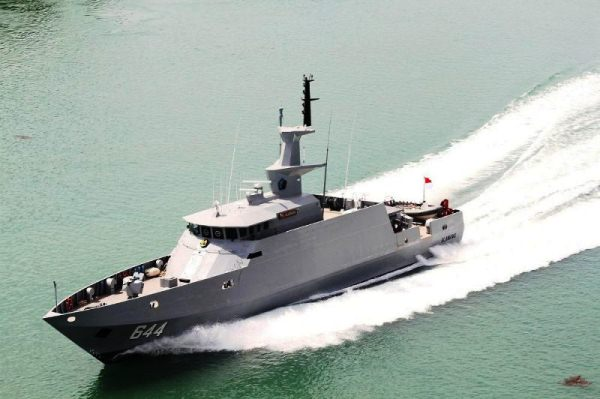

History

Indonesia
- Name: KRI Alamang
- Awarded: PT Palindo Marine
- Commissioned: 20 December 2013
- Identification: 644

General characteristics
- Class & type: Clurit-class fast attack craft
- Displacement: 238 tonnes
- Length: 44 m
- Beam: 8 m
- Speed: 27 knots (50 km/h) (max)

KRI Alamang (644) is a Clurit-class fast attack craft of the Indonesian Navy. Commissioned in 2013, she is the fourth ship of her class.

== Specifications ==
The vessel has a length of 44 meters, a draft of 8 meters, and a displacement of 238 tonnes with the maximum speed of 27 knots. She has a crew complement of 35, and is equipped with two Chinese-made C-705 missile launchers, a OTO Marlin 30mm main gun, and two 20mm Denel Vektor GI-2 guns.

The ship costed Rp 73 billion (USD 6 million in 2013).

== Service history ==
Alamang was commissioned by Minister of Defense Purnomo Yusgiantoro in Batam on 20 December 2013, alongside two patrol boats also built by Palindo. She is part of the Indonesian Navy's Western Fleet Command (Koarmabar).

In the Western Fleet Command, she patrolled the waters around Batam and the Singapore Strait, capturing vessels without documentation or smugglers. She also patrols the waters around the Natuna Islands, capturing one Vietnamese fishing vessel there in 2017.
