= KRI Beladau =

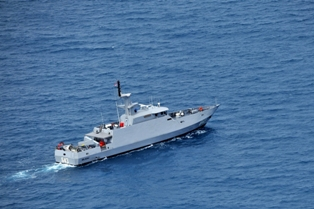

History

Indonesia
- Name: KRI Beladau
- Awarded: PT Palindo Marine
- Commissioned: 25 January 2013
- Identification: 643

General characteristics
- Class & type: Clurit-class fast attack craft
- Displacement: 250 tonnes
- Length: 44 m
- Beam: 7.4 m
- Speed: 27 knots (50 km/h) (max)

KRI Beladau (643) is a Clurit-class fast attack craft of the Indonesian Navy. Commissioned in 2013, she is the third ship of her class.

== Specifications ==
The vessel has a length of 44 meters, a draft of 7.4 meters, and a displacement of 250 tonnes with the maximum speed of 27 knots. She has a crew complement of 35, and is equipped with C-705 missiles, a 20mm Denel Vektor GI-2 main gun, and was later fitted with the AK-630 CIWS.

== Service history ==
Beladau was commissioned by Minister of Defense Purnomo Yusgiantoro in Batam on 25 January 2013. She is part of the Indonesian Navy's Western Fleet Command (Koarmabar).
