= KRI Kerambit =

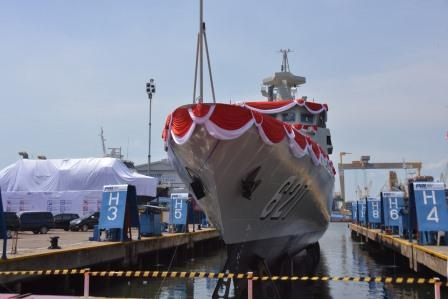
- Kerambit at her launch in 2018

History

Indonesia
- Name: KRI Kerambit
- Awarded: PT PAL
- Launched: 27 February 2018
- Commissioned: 25 July 2019
- Identification: 627

General characteristics
- Class & type: Sampari-class fast attack craft
- Displacement: 500 tonnes
- Length: 60 m
- Beam: 8.1 m
- Draft: 2.6 m
- Speed: 28 knots (52 km/h) (max)
- Range: 2,400 nautical miles (4,400 km)
- Endurance: 5 days

KRI Kerambit (627) is a Sampari-class fast attack craft of the Indonesian Navy. Built by PT PAL, she is the fourth ship in her class.

== Characteristics ==
The vessel, part of the KCR-60m family of fast attack missile craft, has a length of 60 metres (200 ft) and a beam of 8.1 m. At full charge, it has a draft of 2.5 to 2.6 m, and the ship's displacement is 500 tonnes. It has a maximum speed of 28 knots (52 km/h), with a cruising speed of 20 knots (37 km/h). She can stay at sea for 5 days, with a range of 2,400 nautical miles (4,400 km) and a crew capacity of 55.

Kerambit is equipped with the SR-47 search radar and the TR-47 fire control radar. She is armed with a Bofors 40 mm gun as her main gun and Yugoimport-SDPR M71/08 20mm cannon as secondary gun.

== Service history ==
After the deployment of the first three Sampari-class vessels, the Ministry of Defense placed an order for another vessel from PT PAL, which was to have a higher capacity and stability in addition to being compatible to more advanced equipment. The new vessel began construction in February 2017, with a cost of Rp 210 billion compared to Rp 125 billion to preceding ships in the class. The vessel, Kerambit, was launched on 27 February 2018. She was commissioned on 25 July of the following year, and was assigned to the 1st Fleet Command.
