= KRI Rigel =

Research vessel of the Indonesian Navy

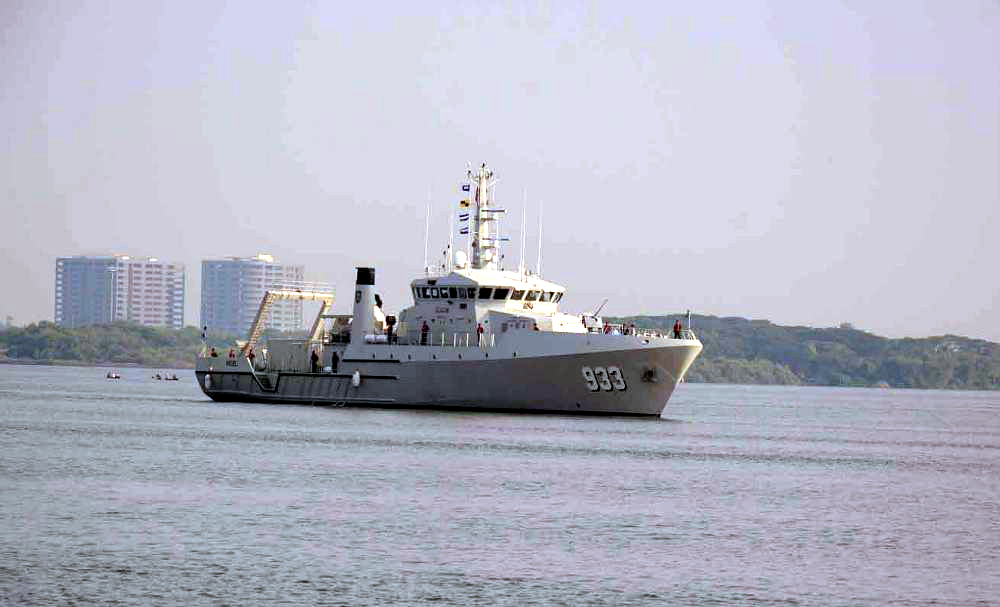
- KRI Rigel on 29 April 2015

History

Indonesia
- Name: Rigel
- Namesake: Rigel
- Ordered: 1 August 2012
- Builder: OCEA Shipbuilding, Les Sables-d'Olonne
- Laid down: October 2013
- Launched: 11 December 2014
- Commissioned: 11 March 2015
- Identification: MMSI number: 525014077; Callsign: PLJJ; Pennant number: 933
- Status: Active

General characteristics
- Type: Rigel-class research vessel
- Displacement: 523 t (515 long tons) standard
- Length: 60.1 m (197 ft 2 in)
- Draught: 4.9 m (16 ft 1 in)
- Propulsion: 2x MTU 8V 4000 M53 diesel engines; 2x fixed pitch propeller
- Speed: 14 kn (26 km/h) maximum
- Range: 4,400 nmi (8,100 km) at 12 kn (22 km/h)
- Complement: 46
- Armament: 1 x Denel Land Systems GI-2 20 mm canon; 2 x 12.7mm machine guns

KRI Rigel (933) is the lead ship of the Rigel-class research vessels of the Indonesian Navy. She is named for Rigel; the brightest star in the constellation Orion.

== Design ==
The ships were built based on the BHO ship procurement contract carried out by the Ministry of Defense of the Republic of Indonesia with the French OCEA shipyard, and is made of aluminum with a weight of 560 tons with dimensions of 60.1 meters long and 11.5 meters wide. She is one of the warships owned by Indonesia, with special specifications for surveys in the ranks of the Indonesian Navy's Hydro-oceanographic Survey Unit. The ships are driven by two MTU Type 8V4000M53 propulsion engines which can produce a maximum speed of 14.0 knots, with a cruising range of 4400 nautical miles and is equipped with AUV (Autonomous Underwater Vehicle) equipment that functions to carry out underwater imaging up to a depth of 1000 meters and sends back. periodic data to the main ship in this case the BHO ship. They are also equipped with ROV (Remotely Operated Vehicle), SSS (side scan sonar), laser scanner to get an overview of the land, AWS (Automatic Weather Station), deep sea and Singlebeam Multibeam Echosounder, CTD (Conductivity Temperature and Depth) equipment, Gravity Corer, laboratory equipment and fishery survey capability. Rigel is the first ship of the MPRV (Multi Purpose Research Vessel) type to be operated in the ranks of the Indonesian Navy under the Hydro-Oceanographic Survey unit. This ship, one of the newest defense equipment owned by the Indonesian Navy, was built at the OCEA shipyard, Les Sables. d'Olonne, France.

She is armed with a Denel GI-2 20 mm autocannon and 12.7 mm machine guns. She has a suite of hydro-oceanographic equipment, capable of collecting data in deep seas.

Beyond her primary role as a survey vessel, KRI Rigel is also able to operate as a patrol vessel.

== Construction and career ==
The ship was laid down in October 2013 and launched on 11 December 2014 by OCEA Shipbuilding, France. She is commissioned on 11 March 2015.

On 1 July 2021, her underwater multibeam echosounder technology has succeeded in detecting the presence of the Passenger Motor Ship (KMP) Yunice which sank in the waters of Bali. the ship was detected at position 8° 10' 31,864'' S - 114° 25' 42,986'' T at depths between 72 meters to 78 meters.
