= KRI Clurit =

Ship belonging to the Indonesian Navy

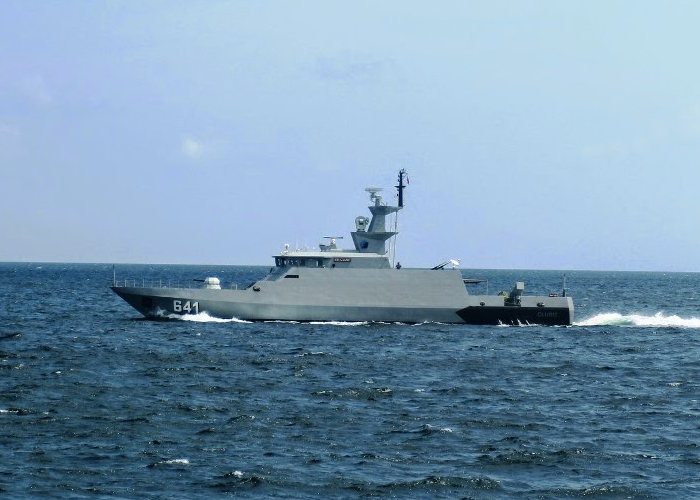

History

Indonesia
- Name: KRI Clurit
- Awarded: PT Palindo Marine
- Commissioned: 25 April 2011
- Identification: 641

General characteristics
- Class & type: Clurit-class fast attack craft
- Displacement: 250 tonnes
- Length: 43 m
- Beam: 7.4 m
- Speed: 27 knots (50 km/h) (max)

KRI Clurit (641) is a Clurit-class fast attack craft of the Indonesian Navy. She was commissioned in 2011 and was the lead ship in her class.

== Characteristics ==
Clurit has a displacement of 250 tonnes, a length of 43 meters, and a draft of 7.4 meters. She is equipped with C-705 missiles launchers, a 30mm gun, and two 20mm guns, alongside AK-630M CIWS.

== Service history ==
Clurit was built by PT Palindo Marine based in Batam, as part of an order for four similar ships. She contained around 45 percent locally manufactured parts, and costed around US$ 8 million. She was commissioned on 25 April 2011 by Minister of Defense Purnomo Yusgiantoro, and she was assigned to the Western Fleet Command (Koarmabar).

In July 2015, Clurit seized two Vietnamese fishing vessels off Ranai, Natuna. She rescued 15 fishermen from their burning vessel in 2017 off Sabang.
