= Denel Land Systems GI-2 =

20 mm Denel Land Systems GI-2
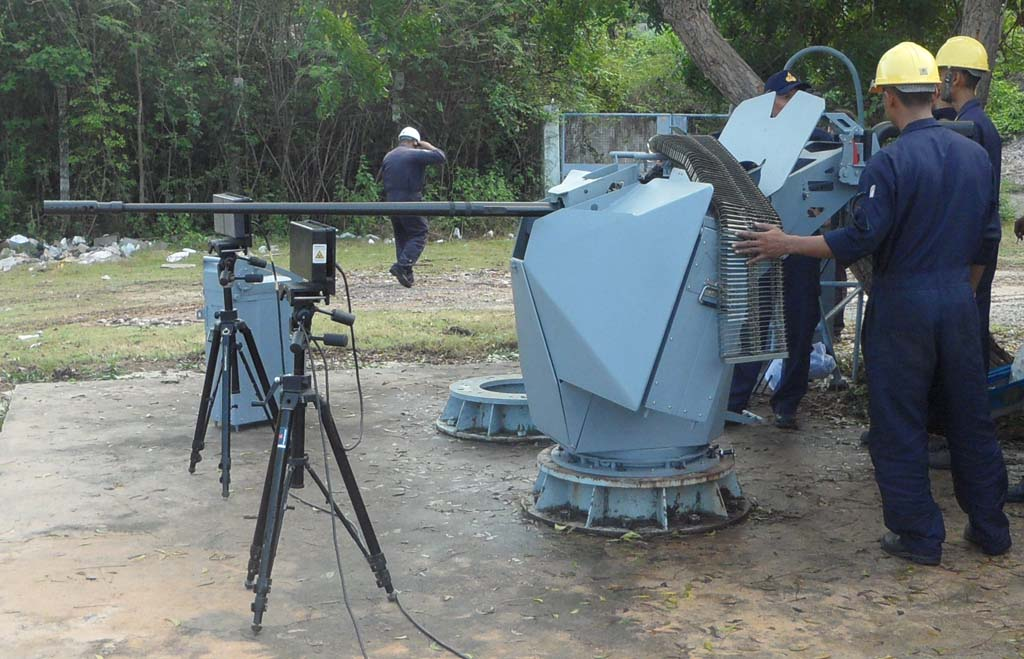
- Denel Land Systems GI-2
- Type: Autocannon
- Place of origin: South Africa

Production history
- Manufacturer: Denel Land Systems (DLS)

Specifications
- Shell: 20x139 linked on F1 link
- Calibre: 20 millimetres (0.79 in)
- Rate of fire: 750 round/min
- Muzzle velocity: 1050 m/s
- Feed system: Left/Right side

The Denel Land Systems GI-2 is an autocannon manufactured by Denel Land Systems (DLS) and used by the South African Army, Navy, Air Force, Royal Thai Navy and Indonesian Navy.

== History ==
The Denel GI-2 is based on the GIAT Modèle F2 gun design, for which Denel has a production license.

== Description ==
The 20 mm GI-2 is a mounted monotube gun, with two 150-cartridge boxes on each side of the piece. After each shot, the empty cartridge is ejected from beneath the weapon. A hydraulic rearming device is available for naval or land versions.

== Applications ==
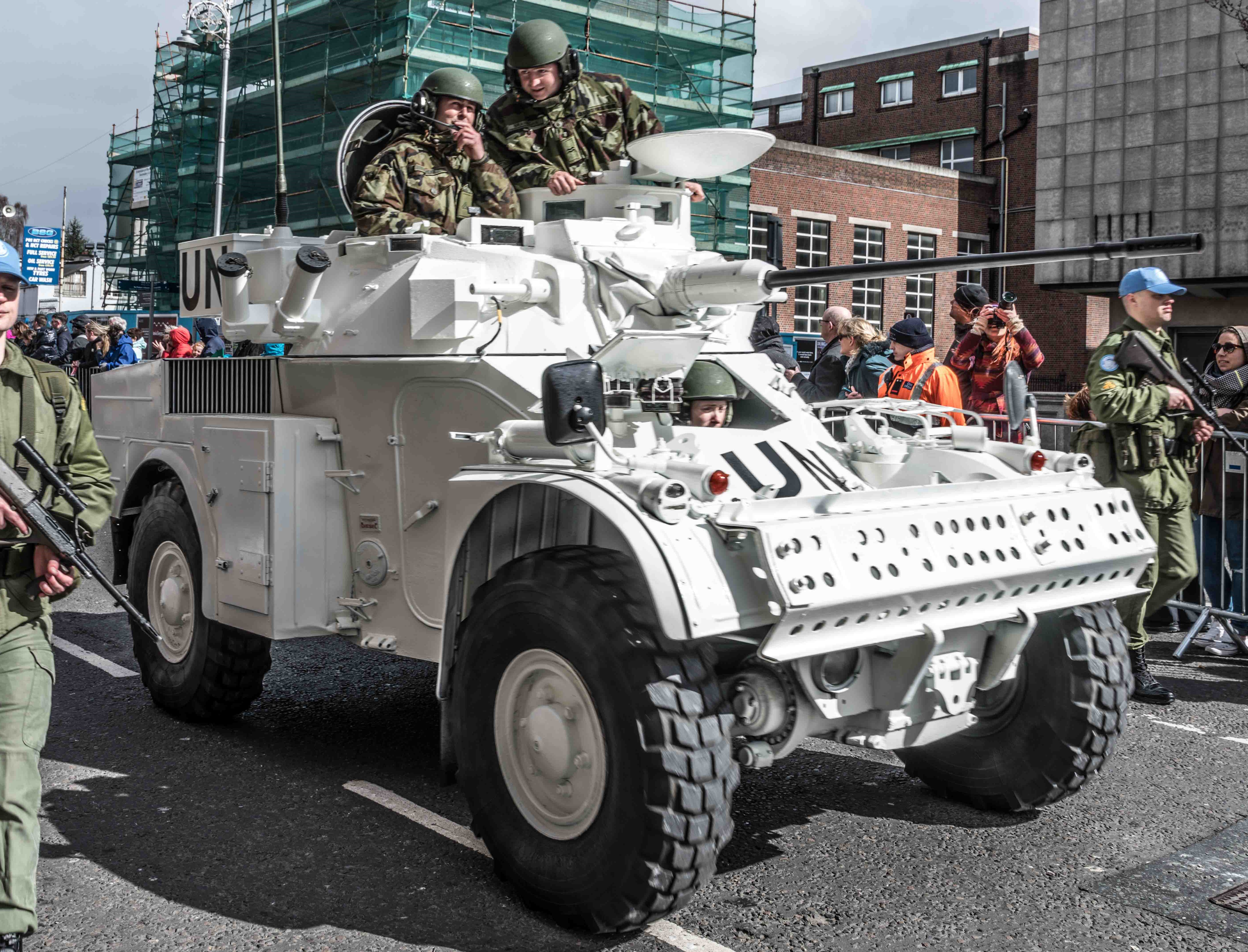
Irish Panhard AML fitted with Denel LCT 20 compact turret.

The GI-2 cannon is used in the following applications:

=== Land ===
- On Denel LCT 20 compact turret
- Ratel-20
- Eland-20
- Panhard AML H-20

=== Air ===
- Denel Rooivalk
- Super Hind upgrade of Mil Mi-24 helicopters by Advanced Technologies & Engineering
- IAR 330, a Romanian-built version of the Aérospatiale SA 330 Puma helicopter

=== Naval ===
- Manually operated deck gun mounts
- Reutech Super Rogue remote weapons station (RWS)
- Suncraft RALCO remote weapons station
- Sigma-class design ships built for various clients by Damen Schelde Naval Shipbuilding

== Users ==
- (Algeria) Algerian Air Force: Used in the upgraded Super Hind attack helicopter.
- (Azerbaijan) Azerbaijani Air Forces: Used in the upgraded Super Hind attack helicopter
- Benin Navy: Reutech Super Rogue RWS
- (Indonesia) Indonesian Navy: Diponegoro class corvette, Rigel class MPRV, Clurit class FAC & Pattimura class corvette.
- Kenya Air Force: For IAR 330 helicopters.
- (Nigeria) Nigerian Navy: Suncraft RALCO RWS on patrol boats.
- (South Africa) South African National Defence Force: Used in land, air and naval applications.
- (Thailand) Royal Thai Navy: HTMS Narathiwat, HTMS Pattani, Patrol boats 228, 229, 230
