= USS LST-942 =

1944 LST-542-class tank landing ship

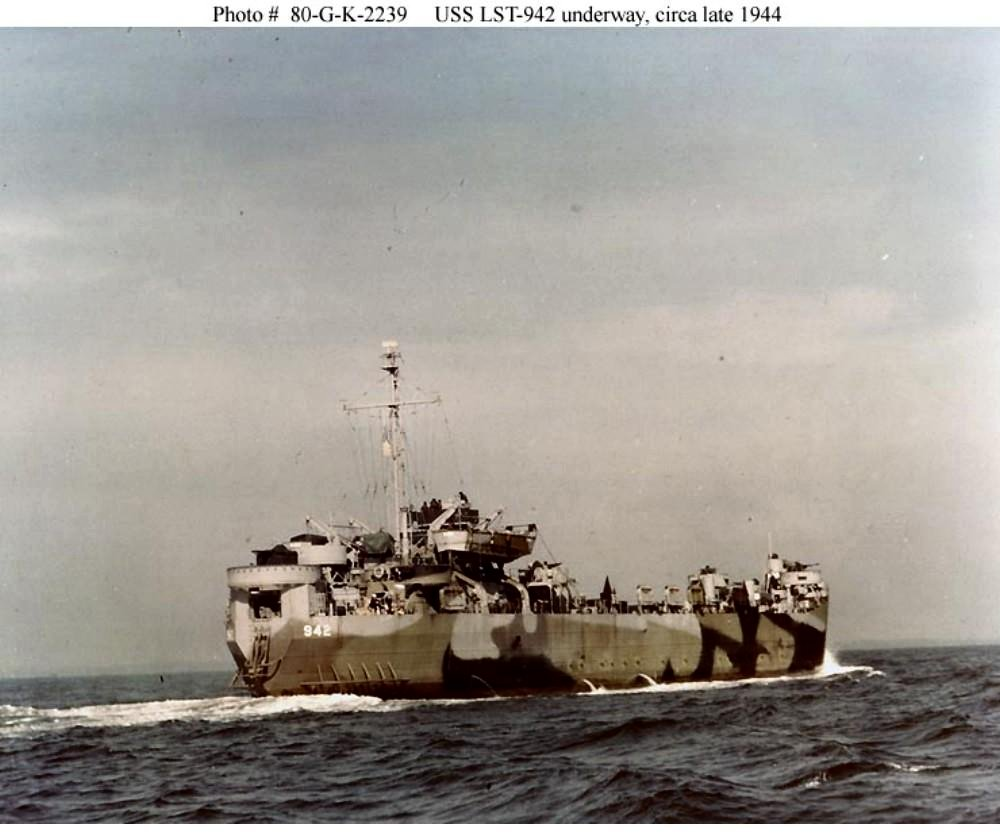
- USS LST-942 under way soon after completion, c. late 1944. LST-942 is painted in Camouflage Measure 31, Design 8L or Design 18L.

History

United States
- Name: LST-942
- Builder: Bethlehem-Hingham Shipyard, Hingham, Massachusetts
- Yard number: 3412
- Laid down: 1 August 1944
- Launched: 6 September 1944
- Commissioned: 26 September 1944
- Decommissioned: 26 June 1946
- Stricken: 31 July 1946
- Identification: Hull symbol: LST-942; Code letters: NVTV
- Honors and awards: 1 × battle star
- Fate: Sold for commercial service, 10 June 1948
- Status: Fate unknown

General characteristics
- Class & type: LST-542-class tank landing ship
- Displacement: 1,625 long tons (1,651 t) (light); 4,080 long tons (4,145 t) (full (seagoing draft with 1,675 short tons (1,520 t) load); 2,366 long tons (2,404 t) (beaching)
- Length: 328 ft (100 m) oa
- Beam: 50 ft (15 m)
- Draft: Unloaded: 2 ft 4 in (0.71 m) forward; 7 ft 6 in (2.29 m) aft; Full load: 8 ft 3 in (2.51 m) forward; 14 ft 1 in (4.29 m) aft; Landing with 500 short tons (450 t) load: 3 ft 11 in (1.19 m) forward; 9 ft 10 in (3.00 m) aft; Limiting 11 ft 2 in (3.40 m); Maximum navigation 14 ft 1 in (4.29 m)
- Installed power: 2 × 900 hp (670 kW) Electro-Motive Diesel 12-567A diesel engines; 1,800 shp (1,300 kW)
- Propulsion: 1 × Falk main reduction gears; 2 × Propellers
- Speed: 11.6 kn (21.5 km/h; 13.3 mph)
- Range: 24,000 nmi (44,000 km; 28,000 mi) at 9 kn (17 km/h; 10 mph) while displacing 3,960 long tons (4,024 t)
- Boats & landing craft carried: 2 x LCVPs
- Capacity: 1,600–1,900 short tons (3,200,000–3,800,000 lb; 1,500,000–1,700,000 kg) cargo depending on mission
- Troops: 16 officers, 147 enlisted men
- Complement: 13 officers, 104 enlisted men
- Armament: Varied, ultimate armament; 2 × twin 40 mm (1.57 in) Bofors guns; 4 × single 40 mm Bofors guns; 12 × 20 mm (0.79 in) Oerlikon cannons

Service record
- Operations: Consolidation and capture of Southern Philippines; Visayan Island landings (16–18 April 1945)
- Awards: American Campaign Medal; Asiatic–Pacific Campaign Medal; World War II Victory Medal; Navy Occupation Service Medal w/Asia Clasp; Philippine Republic Presidential Unit Citation; Philippine Liberation Medal

USS LST-942 was an LST-542-class tank landing ship in the United States Navy. Like many of her class, she was not named and is properly referred to by her hull designation.

== Construction ==
LST-942 was laid down on 1 August 1944, at Hingham, Massachusetts, by the Bethlehem-Hingham Shipyard; launched on 6 September 1944; and commissioned on 26 September 1944.

== Service history ==
During World War II LST-942 was assigned to the Asiatic-Pacific theater and participated in the Visayan Island landings in April 1945.

Following the war, she performed occupation duty in the Far East until mid-February 1946. LST-942 returned to the United States and was decommissioned on 26 June 1946, and struck from the Navy list on 31 July, that same year. On 10 June 1948, the ship was sold to the Humble Oil & Refining Co., of Houston, Texas, for operation.

== Awards ==
LST-942 earned one battle star for World War II service.

== Bibliography ==
Online resources

- "LST-942". Dictionary of American Naval Fighting Ships. Naval History and Heritage Command. This article incorporates text from this source, which is in the public domain.
- "Bethlehem-Hingham, Hingham MA". www.ShipbuildingHistory.com. 11 August 2011.
- "USS LST-942". NavSource. 6 November 2015.
