= Takeo Manjome =

Japanese general

- 万城目 武雄
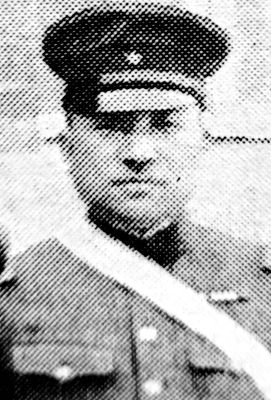
- Born: January 25, 1891
- Died: March 11, 1975 (aged 84)
- Military career
- Allegiance: Empire of Japan
- Branch: Imperial Japanese Army
- Rank: Major General
- Unit: 102nd IJA Division
- Commands: 78th Infantry Brigade
- Conflicts: World War II; Philippines campaign; Battle for Cebu City

Takeo Manjome (万城目 武雄, Manjōme Takeo; January 25, 1891 – March 11, 1975) was a major general in the Imperial Japanese Army during World War II.

== Biography ==
Takeo Manjome was a major-general of the Imperial Japanese Army who was one of the generals in command of the occupation of the Philippines. He commanded the 78th Infantry Brigade of the 102nd IJA Division, and was one of the occupiers of the Visayan Islands. He wanted to build defenses around the coastal plains of Cebu, which was an island that United States' soldiers were landing on. But after a while of fighting, he decided that resistance would be futile and that he should call things quits. He began a slow retreat, hoping to inflict some casualties on the Americans as they fell back to friendly territory. But James M. Cushing's 8,500 Cebu guerrillas, who had remained resolute to fight ever since 1941, ambushed the retreating forces. This greatly helped the invading American soldiers to quickly liberate Cebu.

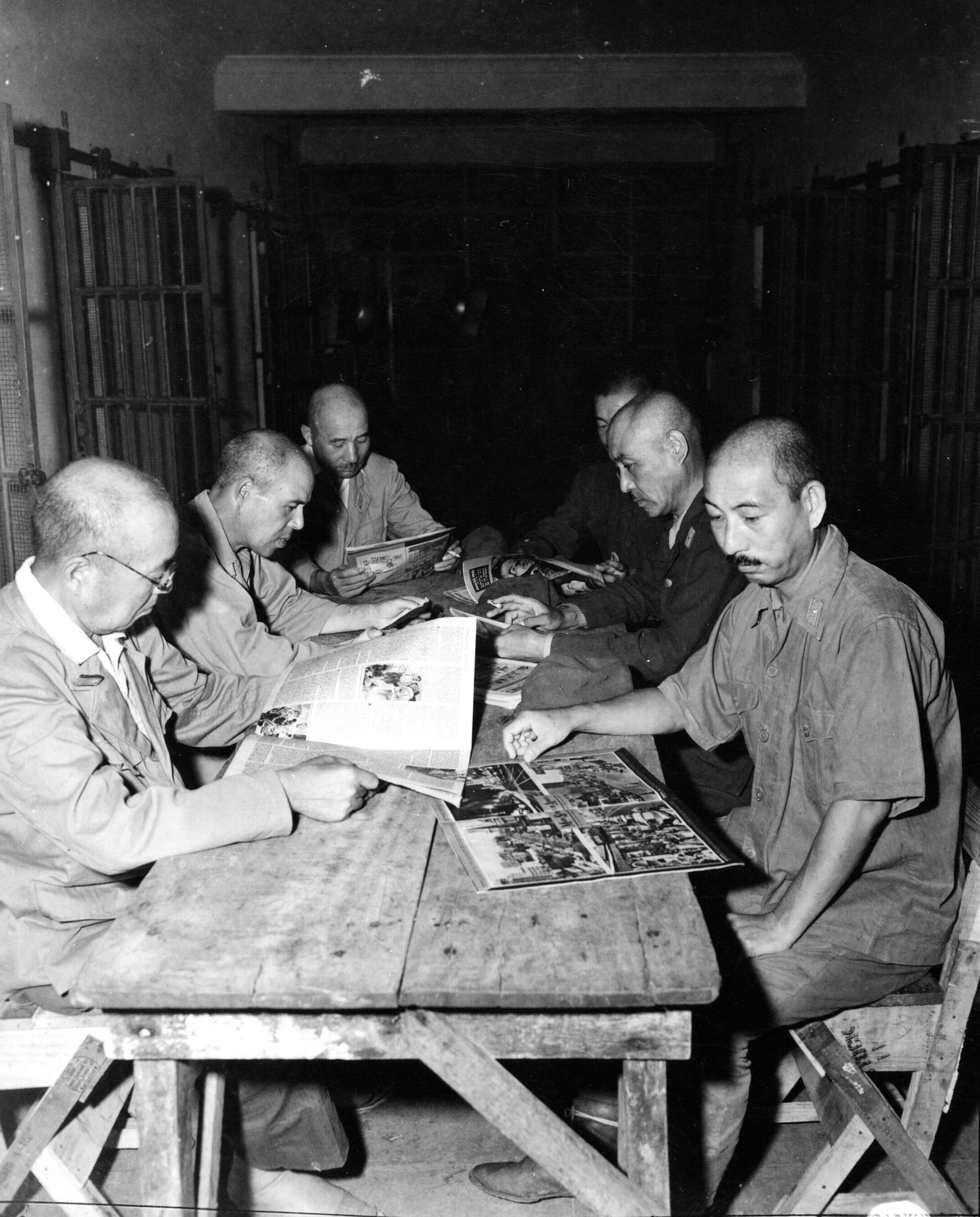
Manjome among the surrendered officers, 1945

He and 10,000 Japanese soldiers who were forced to hide in the jungles of Cebu later surrendered to American and Filipino forces in August 1945.
