= Philippines campaign (1944–1945) =

Aspect of WWII history

- Part of the Pacific Theater of World War II
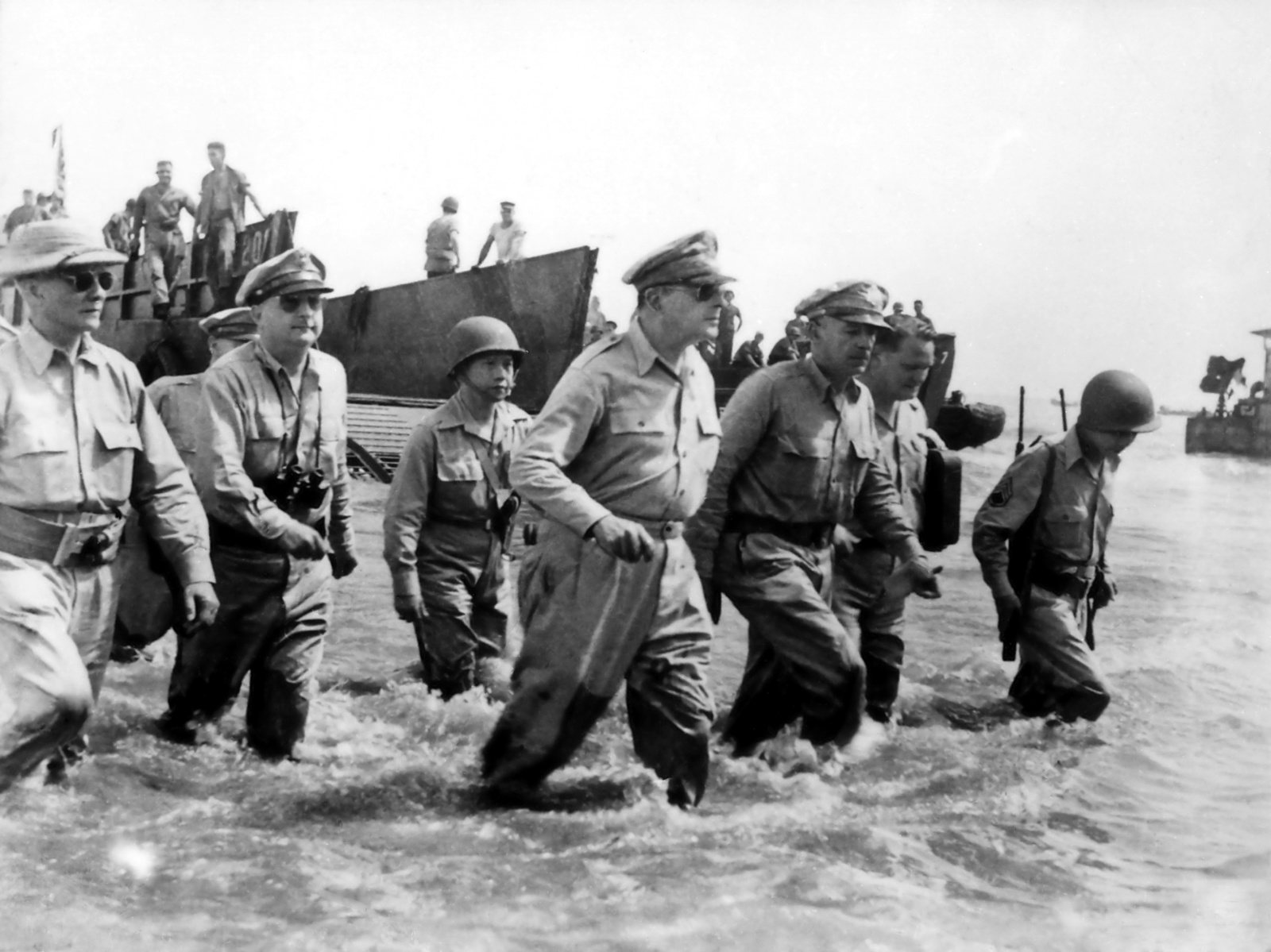
- General Douglas MacArthur, President Osmeña, and staff land at Palo, Leyte on 20 October 1944
Date	20 October 1944 – 15 August 1945
Location	Philippines
Result	Allied victory
Territorial changes	Liberation of the Philippines from Japan: End of the Second Philippine Republic; Restoration of the Commonwealth of the Philippines

Belligerents
United States: Commonwealth of the Philippines; Australia (Naval support only); Mexico (Air support only)	Japan: Second Philippine Republic

Commanders and leaders
SWPA: Douglas MacArthur; Ground forces: 6th Army: Walter Krueger; Innis P. Swift; Oscar Griswold; Franklin C. Sibert; John R. Hodge; 8th Army: Robert L. Eichelberger; Charles P. Hall; 3rd Fleet: William F. Halsey; Marc A. Mitscher; 7th Fleet: Thomas C. Kinkaid; Theodore S. Wilkinson; Allied Air Forces: George C. Kenney; Ennis Whitehead; Philippine forces: Basilio Valdes; Carlos Romulo; Ruperto Kangleon; Luis Taruc; Task Force 74: John A. Collins	Southern Army Group: Hisaichi Terauchi; Combined Fleet: Soemu Toyoda; Takeo Kurita; Shōji Nishimura †; Jisaburo Ozawa; Matome Ugaki; Kiyohide Shima; Sanji Iwabuchi ‡‡; 14th Area Army: Tomoyuki Yamashita; Akira Mutō; Shizuo Yokoyama; 35th Army: Sosaku Suzuki †; Takaji Wachi; Gyosaku Morozumi; Air forces: Kyoji Tominaga; Takijirō Ōnishi; Shigeru Fukudome; Philippine Republic: Benigno Ramos (MIA); Paulino Santos; Artemio Ricarte #; Emilio Aguinaldo (POW)

Units involved
(United States) 6th Army I Corps: 6th Infantry Division; 43rd Infantry Division; XIV Corps: 37th Infantry Division; 40th Infantry Division; X Corps: 1st Cavalry Division; 24th Infantry Division; XXIV Corps: 77th Infantry Division; 7th Infantry Division; 96th Infantry Division; 6th Army Reserves: 11th Airborne Division; 25th Infantry Division; 158th Infantry Regiment; 13th Armored Group; 6th Ranger Battalion; (United States) 8th Army XI Corps: 23rd Infantry Division; 31st Infantry Division; 38th Infantry Division; 41st Infantry Division; 93rd Infantry Division; 503rd Infantry Regiment; Philippine Army: Recognized guerrillas; Hukbalahap; Moro guerrillas; (United States) 5th Air Force: (Mexico) 201st Squadron; (United States) 3rd Fleet (United States) 7th Fleet (Australia) Task Force 74	(Empire of Japan) 14th Area Army Directly controlled: 1st Infantry Division; 10th Infantry Division; 19th Infantry Division; 23rd Infantry Division; 26th Infantry Division; 103rd Infantry Division; 105th Infantry Division; 2nd Tank Division; 68th Infantry Brigade; 55th Mixed Brigade; 58th Mixed Brigade; 35th Army: 16th Infantry Division; 30th Infantry Division; 100th Infantry Division; 102nd Infantry Division; 54th Mixed Brigade; 41st Army: 9th Artillery HQ; 8th Infantry Division; 39th Mixed Brigade; 65th Infantry Brigade; Philippine Republican Army: Makapili; Philippine Constabulary; (Empire of Japan) 4th Air Army: 6th Air Division; 7th Air Division; (Empire of Japan) Combined Fleet: 2nd Fleet; 3rd Fleet; 5th Fleet; (Empire of Japan) Navy Air Service: 1st Naval Air Fleet; 2nd Naval Air Fleet

Strength
(United States) 1,250,000; 30,000+ guerrillas (Mexico) 300	(Empire of Japan) 529,802 (Second Philippine Republic) ~6,000 militia

Casualties and losses
Total: 72,000+ (United States) American Personnel: 20,712 battle deaths; 50,954 surviving wounded; 52+ surviving prisoners (Army); 200+ unaccounted missing (Army); 140,000+ nonbattle casualties; Breakdown by service: Army: To 4 July 1945 13,106 killed in action 47,166 wounded (2,934 died) 96 captured (44 died) 349 missing (149 died) 16,233 total battle deaths; Navy: To 1 July 1945 4,026 killed in action 270 died of wounds 40 died as POWs 6,484 surviving wounded (830 invalidated from service); Marines: To 1 July 1945 132 killed in action 10 died of wounds 1 died as a POW 238 surviving wounded (25 invalidated from service) (Note: Other sources mention 3,800 Navy casualties at Leyte Gulf, 2,680 casualties in the month after December 13, 1944 (omitting November), and 790 lost in a typhoon); Materiel: 33+ ships sunk 95+ ships damaged 485+ aircraft (Commonwealth of the Philippines) Filipino Unknown (Mexico) Mexican ~10 (5 non-combat)	Total: 430,000 (Empire of Japan) Japanese Personnel: 420,000 dead and missing (Note: Approximately 80% of Japanese deaths were from starvation or disease.); 10,000 casualties at Leyte Gulf.; 12,573 captured; 13,500 - 67,463 Casualties inflicted by Pilipino guerilla groups; Materiel: 93+ ships sunk 1,300 aircraft

The Philippines campaign, (Note: Also known as the Battle of the Philippines, Second Philippines campaign, or the Liberation of the Philippines.) codenamed Operation Musketeer I, II, and III, was the American, Filipino, Australian, and Mexican campaign to defeat and expel the Imperial Japanese forces occupying the Philippines during World War II.

The Imperial Japanese Army overran all of the Philippines during the first half of 1942. Two years later, the liberation of the Philippines from Japan commenced with amphibious landings on the eastern Philippine island of Leyte on 20 October 1944. While Manila was liberated after intense urban combat in early 1945, fighting elsewhere in the Philippines continued until the end of the war. The United States and Philippine Commonwealth military forces, with naval and air support from Australia and the Mexican 201st Fighter Squadron, were still in the process of liberating the Philippines when the Japanese forces in the Philippines were ordered to surrender by Tokyo on 15 August 1945, after the United States dropped the atomic bombs on Hiroshima and Nagasaki and the Soviet-Japanese War.

== Planning ==
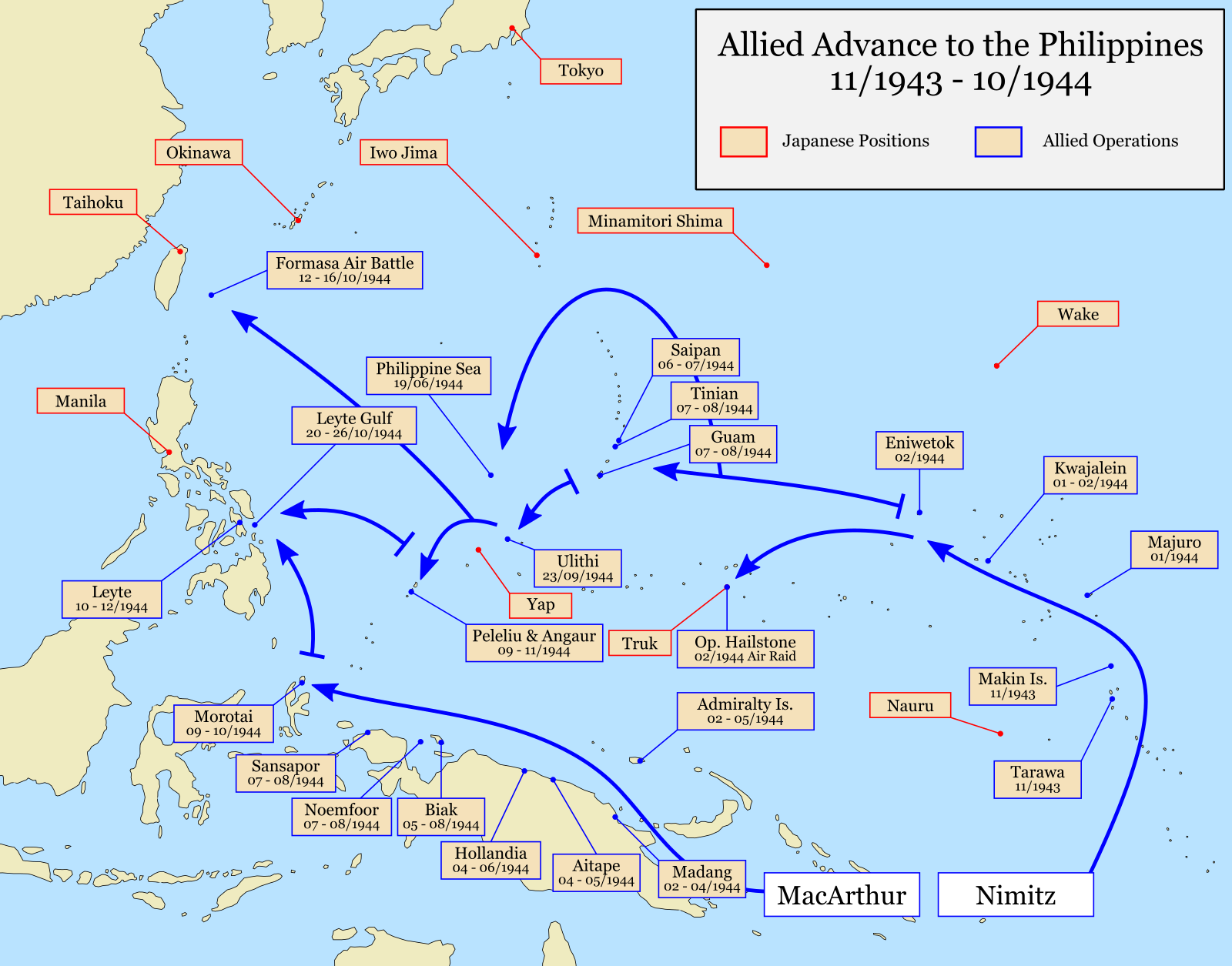
Allied advances through the southwest and central Pacific in 1943–1944, showing the strategic approach to the Philippines.

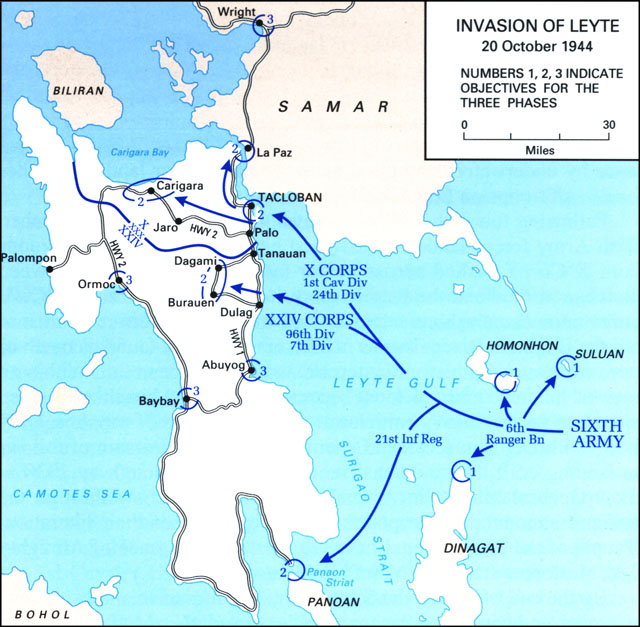
Plan for the Invasion of Leyte

By mid-1944, American forces were only 300 nautical miles (560 km) southeast of Mindanao, the largest island in the southern Philippines – and able to bomb Japanese positions there using long-range bombers. American forces under Fleet Admiral Chester W. Nimitz had advanced across the Central Pacific Ocean, capturing the Gilbert Islands, some of the Marshall Islands, and most of the Marianas Islands, bypassing many Japanese Army garrisons and leaving them without hope of resupply or reinforcement.

American carrier aircraft were already conducting air strikes and fighter sweeps against the Japanese in the Philippines, especially focusing on IJA and IJN airfields. U.S. Army and Australian Army troops under the American General Douglas MacArthur, the Supreme Commander of the Southwest Pacific Theater of Operations, had either overrun, or else isolated and bypassed, all remaining Japanese Army units on New Guinea and the Admiralty Islands. Before the invasion of the Philippines, MacArthur's northernmost conquest had been at Morotai in the Dutch East Indies on 15–16 September 1944. This was MacArthur's only base within bomber range of the southern Philippines.

U.S. Navy, Marine Corps, and Army as well as Australian and New Zealand forces under the commands of General MacArthur and Admiral William F. Halsey Jr. had previously isolated the large Japanese South Pacific base at Rabaul, New Britain, during Operation Cartwheel. Allied forces had captured more lightly defended islands surrounding Rabaul, and then constructed air bases on them from which to bomb and blockade the Japanese forces at Rabaul into combat ineffectiveness, while avoiding a costly battle against the large IJA garrison there. (Note: The Solomon Islands campaign west of Guadalcanal were in the South West Pacific Area, which was the responsibility of General MacArthur. When Admiral Halsey operated in the Solomon Islands that was west of 159° east longitude he reported to MacArthur. When he operated east of 159° east longitude he reported to Nimitz. The middle of Santa Isabel Island is where 159° east longitude runs through. Operation Cartwheel took place west of Santa Isabel Island.)

Following victories in the Marianas campaign (on Saipan, on Guam, and on Tinian, from June–August 1944), American forces were drawing close to Japan itself. From the Marianas, long-range B-29 Superfortress heavy bombers of the U.S. Army Air Forces (USAAF) could bomb the Japanese home islands from well-supplied air bases that enjoyed direct access to supplies via cargo ships and tankers. The earlier phase of long-range B-29 raids against Japan had been carried out from the end of a circuitous supply line via British India and British Burma, which proved to be inadequate in sustaining an effective bombing campaign. All B-29s were transferred to the Marianas during the fall of 1944.

Although Japanese decisionmakers recognized that Japan was losing the war at this stage, the Japanese Government, as well as the Imperial Japanese Army and Navy, refused to entertain the prospect of surrender.

There had been a close relationship between the people of the Philippines and the United States since 1898, with the Philippines becoming the Commonwealth of the Philippines in 1935, and promised independence in mid-1946. Furthermore, an extensive series of air attacks by the American Fast Carrier Task Force under Admiral William F. Halsey against Japanese airfields and other bases on the Philippines had encountered little opposition from land-based Japanese aircraft. Upon Admiral Halsey's recommendation, the Combined Chiefs of Staff, meeting in Canada, approved a decision not only to move up the date for the first amphibious landing in the Philippines, but also to move this landing north from the southernmost island of Mindanao to the central island of Leyte. The new date set for the landing on Leyte, 20 October 1944, was two months before the previous target date to land on Mindanao.

By late 1944 the Filipino people were anticipating an American invasion. After the defeat of American forces on the islands in April 1942, the Japanese had occupied the entirety of the island chain. The Japanese occupation was harsh, accompanied by atrocities and with large numbers of Filipinos pressed into slave labor. From mid-1942 through mid-1944, MacArthur and Nimitz supported the Filipino guerrilla resistance via U.S. Navy submarines supply runs and a few parachute drops, so that the guerrillas could harass the Japanese Army and take control of the rural jungle and mountainous areas, which amounted to about half of the archipelago. While remaining loyal to the United States, many Filipinos hoped and believed that liberation from the Japanese would bring them freedom and their already-promised independence.

The Australian government offered General MacArthur the First Corps of the Australian Army to support the liberation of the Philippines. MacArthur suggested that two Australian infantry divisions be employed, each of them attached to a different U.S. Army Corps, but this idea was not acceptable to the Australian Cabinet, which wanted to have significant operational control within a certain area of the Philippines, rather than simply being part of a U.S. Army Corps. No agreement was ever reached between the Australian Cabinet and MacArthur – who might have wanted it that way. However, units from the Royal Australian Air Force and the Royal Australian Navy, such as the heavy cruiser HMAS Australia, were involved.

In addition to rejecting Australian ground troops, MacArthur also rejected the use of Marines for major ground combat operations during all 10 months of the Philippines campaign. The only contributions by the U.S. Marine Corps in this campaign were USMC aircraft and aviators, who provided air cover for U.S. Army ground units and assisted U.S. Army Air Forces aircraft, as well as one small USMC artillery unit, V Amphibious Corps (VAC) Artillery, commanded by Brigadier General Thomas E. Bourke. These 1,500 USMC artillerymen only fought in the Philippines during the Battle of Leyte from 21 October to 13 December. This small artillery contingent was the only USMC ground combat unit that served in the Philippines in 1944-45.

During the Allied re-conquest of the Philippines, Filipino guerrillas began to strike openly against Japanese forces, carried out reconnaissance activities ahead of the advancing regular troops, and fought alongside advancing American divisions.

== Leyte ==
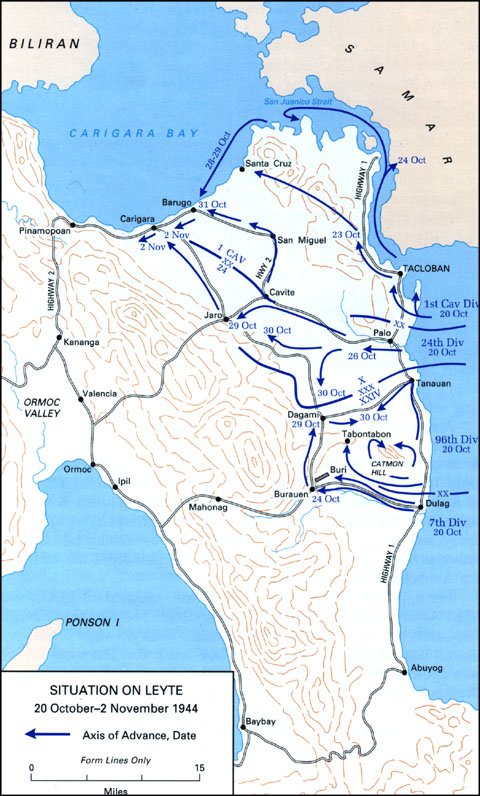
U.S. Army map of operations on Leyte from 20 October to 2 November 1944, showing the initial American advance inland.

Contemporary U.S. Navy map of the Battle of Leyte Gulf, 23–26 October 1944, showing the major naval engagements around the Philippines.

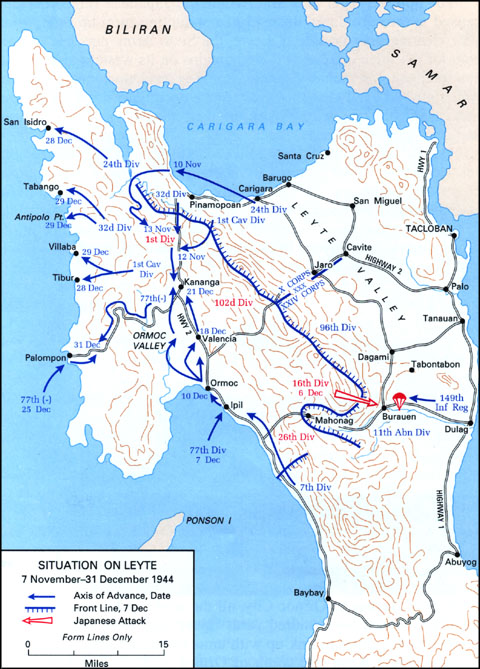
U.S. Army operational map showing the later stages of the Leyte ground campaign and the advance toward Japanese positions in the west.

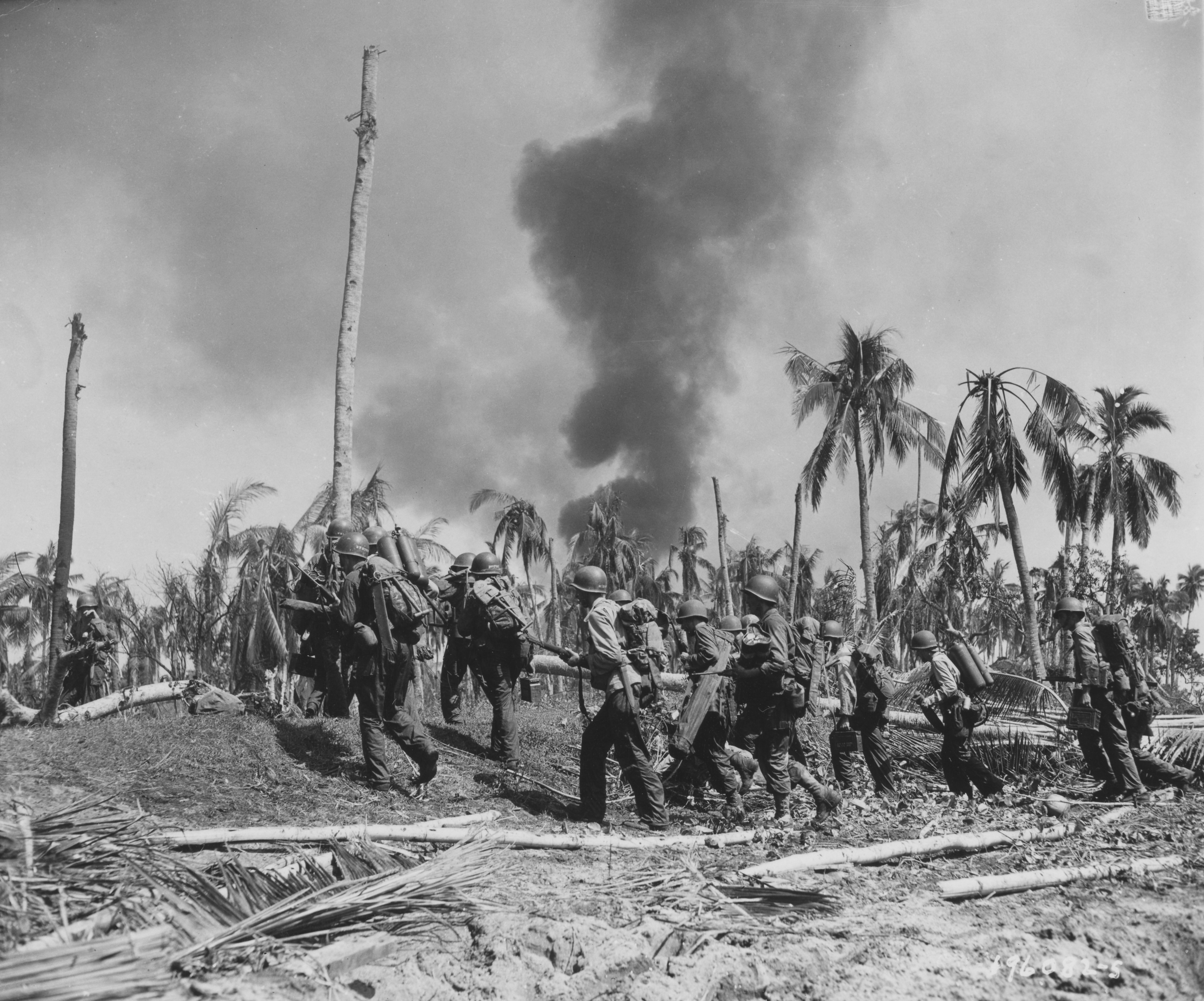
US soldiers on Leyte shortly after the landing

On 20 October 1944, the U.S. Sixth Army, supported by naval and air bombardment, landed on the favorable eastern shore of Leyte, one of the islands of the Visayas island group, northeast of Mindanao. The Japanese miscalculated the relative strength of the American naval and air forces, and attempted to destroy the landing forces using most of the remaining surface strength of the IJN. This resulted in a sequence of naval engagements collectively known as the Battle of Leyte Gulf, fought from 23 October to 26 October. This decisive victory by the U.S. Navy, its Fast Carrier Task Force, its surface fleet, and its submarines effectively destroyed the remainder of the Imperial Japanese Navy (IJN), which had already lost all of its effective aircraft carrier forces. The IJN had four of its carriers sunk (which were albeit equipped with depleted air squadrons, and used only as decoys), numerous battleships and heavy cruisers, and a large number of light cruisers and destroyers. The IJN was effectively crippled after the battle, and was unable to fight another fleet action for the rest of the war.

The U.S. Sixth Army continued its advance from the east, as the Japanese rushed reinforcements to the Ormoc Bay area on the western side of the island. While the Sixth Army was continually reinforced, the U.S. Fifth Air Force and the U.S. 3rd Fleet's Task Force 38 were able to devastate the Japanese attempts at air attacks and at landing new reinforcements and supplies, and also provide much support to the Army's ground troops during the Battle of Ormoc Bay from 11 November to 21 December 1944.

Filipino guerrilla forces also performed valuable service in maintaining public order and in keeping the roads and highways free of congestion. After the American beachheads were established, the Leyte guerrilla groups were attached directly to the Sixth Army at the corps and division level in order to assist in scouting, intelligence, and combat operations. With the initial U.S. Sixth Army landings on the beaches at Tacloban and Dulag, Colonel Ruperto Kangleon's units went into action. They dynamited key bridges to block Japanese displacement toward the target area; they harassed enemy patrols; and they sabotaged supply and ammunition depots. Information on enemy troop movements and dispositions sent from guerrilla outposts to Kangleon's Headquarters was dispatched immediately to Sixth Army.

During frequent torrential rainfall and over difficult terrain, the American advance continued across Leyte and onto the major island of Samar, just north of Leyte. On 7 December 1944, the U.S. Army units made another amphibious landing at Ormoc Bay and, after a major land and air battle, the landing force cut off all Japanese ability to reinforce and resupply their troops on Leyte. Although combat continued on Leyte until the end of the war, most major fighting had subsided by early 1945.

== Mindoro ==
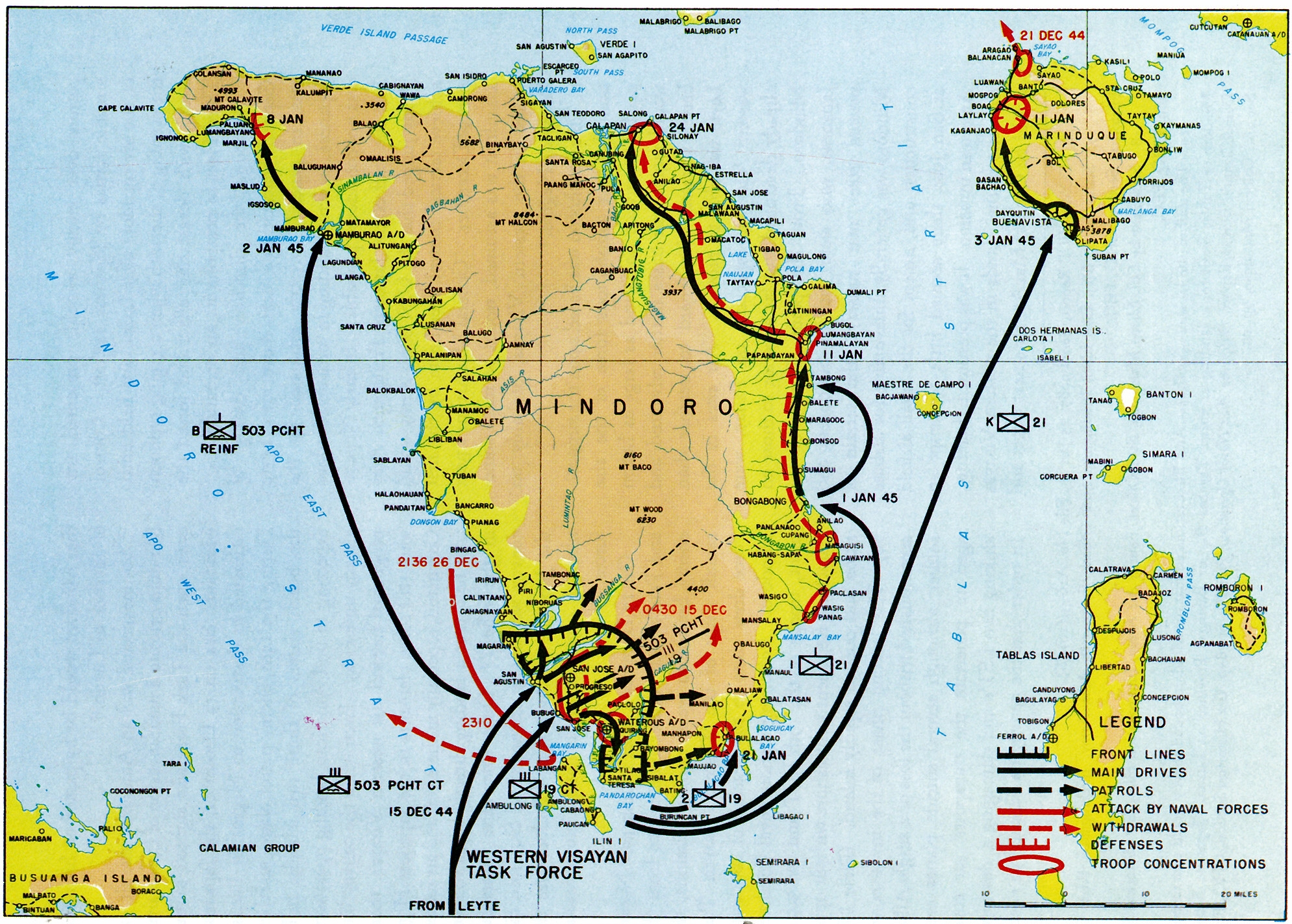
Map of Allied operations on Mindoro in December 1944, including the landing area and subsequent movements inland.

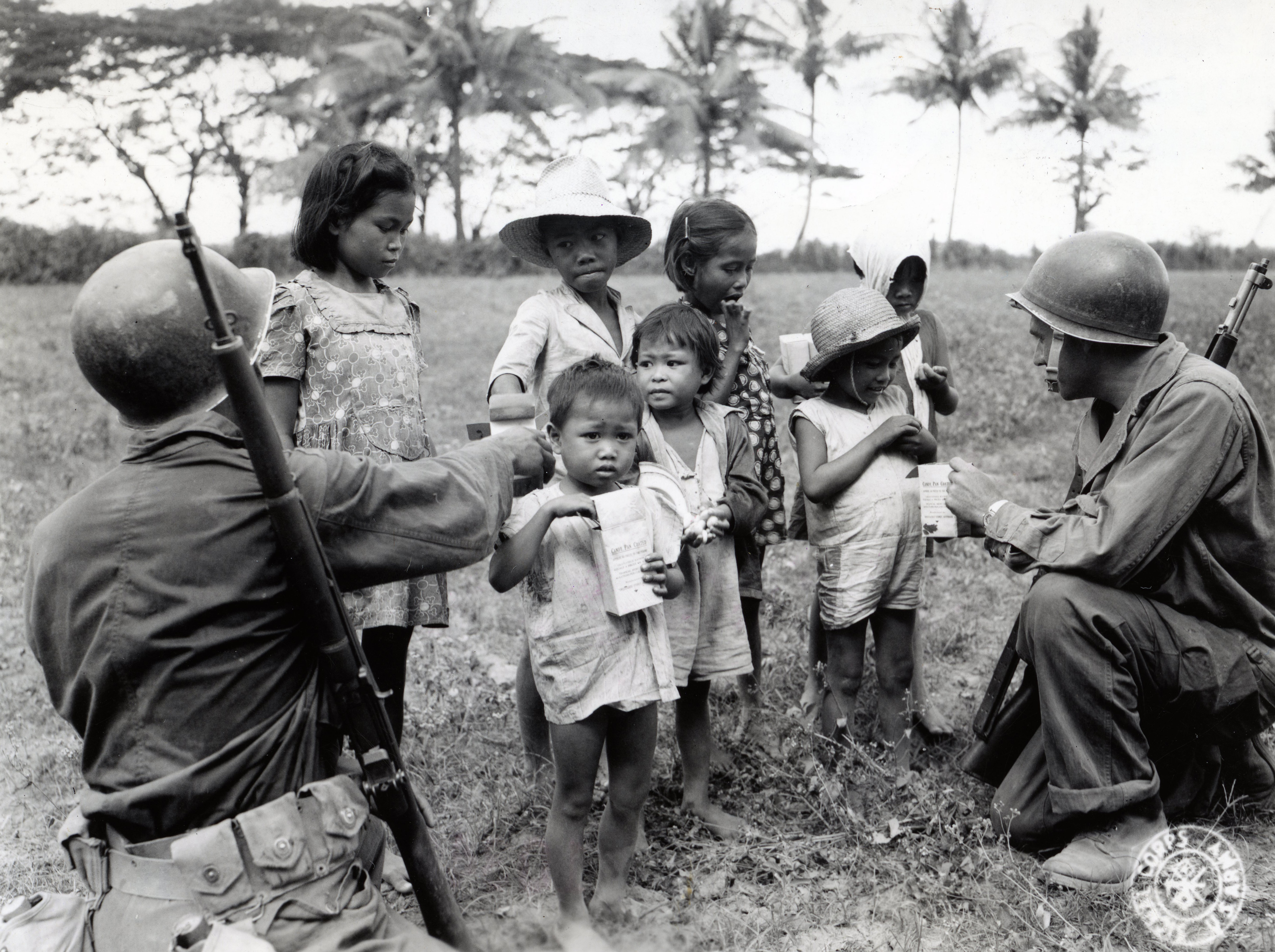
Left to right: Pfc. Philip H. Dunbar (Worcester, Massachusetts) and Pvt. Si Gerson (New York City) giving Christmas candy to Filipino children in San Jose, Mindoro Island, December 25, 1944

The U.S. Sixth Army's second major target to attack was Mindoro. This large island sits directly south of Luzon and Manila Bay, and MacArthur's main goal in seizing it was to construct airfields that could extend American air superiority over the major seaport and capital city of Manila on Luzon.

The Seventh Fleet's large invasion convoy from Leyte to Mindoro came under sustained attack by kamikaze aircraft, but Japanese air units were unable to delay the American invasion of Mindoro. Mindoro was only lightly occupied by the Japanese Army, and much of it was held by Filipino guerrillas, so Mindoro was quickly overrun. U.S. Army engineers rapidly constructed a major air base at San Jose. Besides its proximity to Luzon, Mindoro possessed another advantage for American forces: frequent good flying weather given its dry climate. This is in sharp contrast to Leyte, which receives torrential rains most of the year, not only giving it poor flying weather, but making it very muddy and difficult to construct airfields.

Mindoro was also the location of another breakthrough: the first appearance during the War in the Pacific of USAAF squadrons flying the fast, long-range P-51B Mustang fighters. Mindoro was a major victory for the 6th Army and the USAAF, and it also provided the major base for the next move of MacArthur's 6th Army: the invasion of Luzon, especially at Lingayen Gulf on its western coast.

== Luzon ==
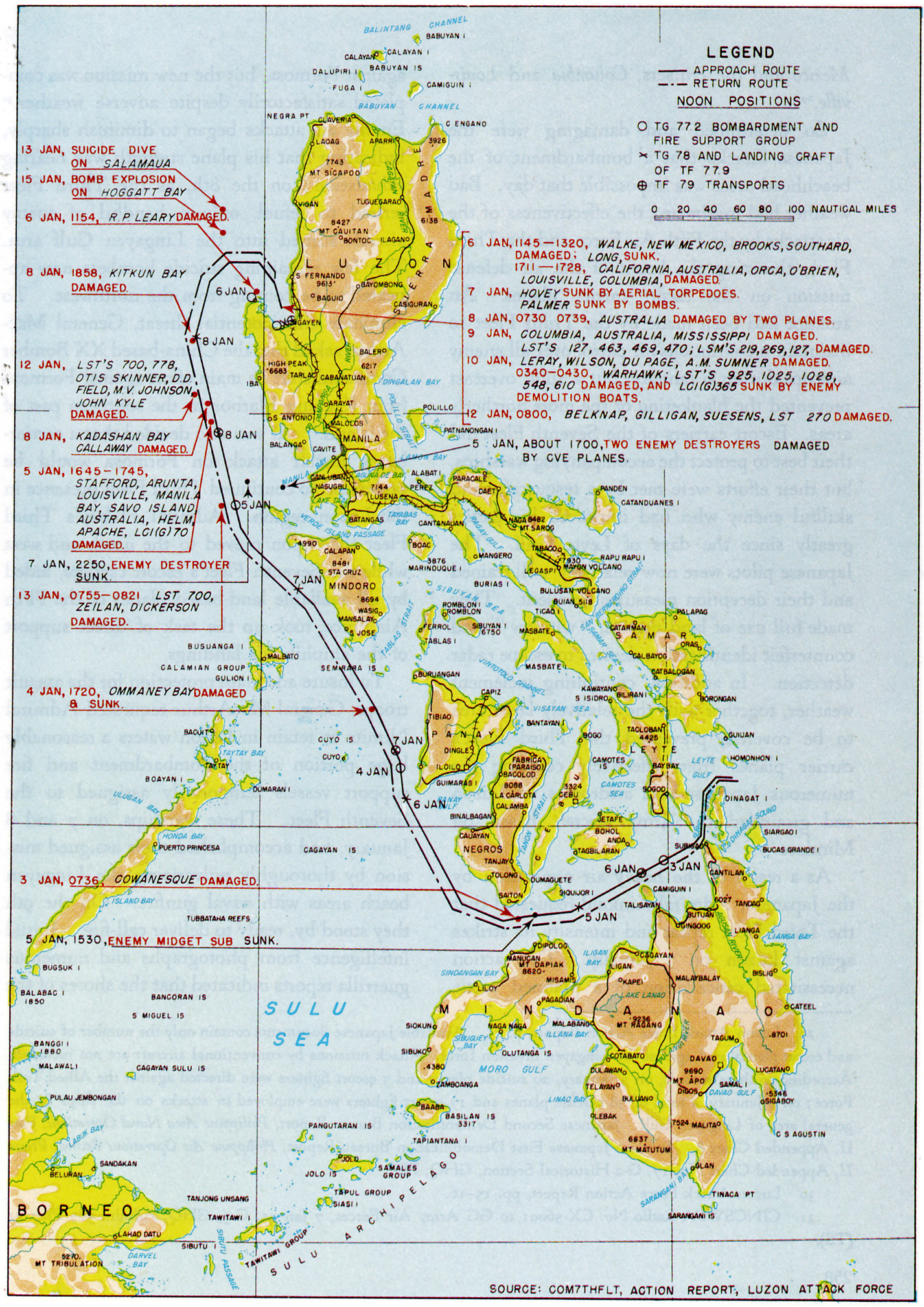
Routes taken by U.S. naval forces approaching Lingayen Gulf for the landings on Luzon, 9 January 1945.

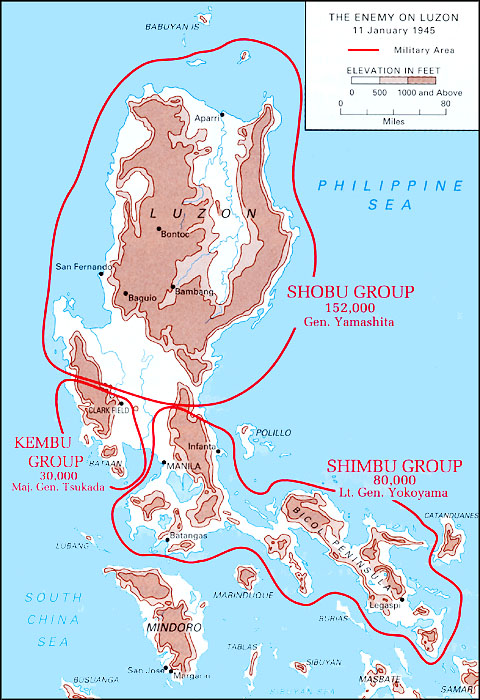
Japanese troop dispositions on Luzon as of 11 January 1945, shortly after the Allied landings at Lingayen Gulf.

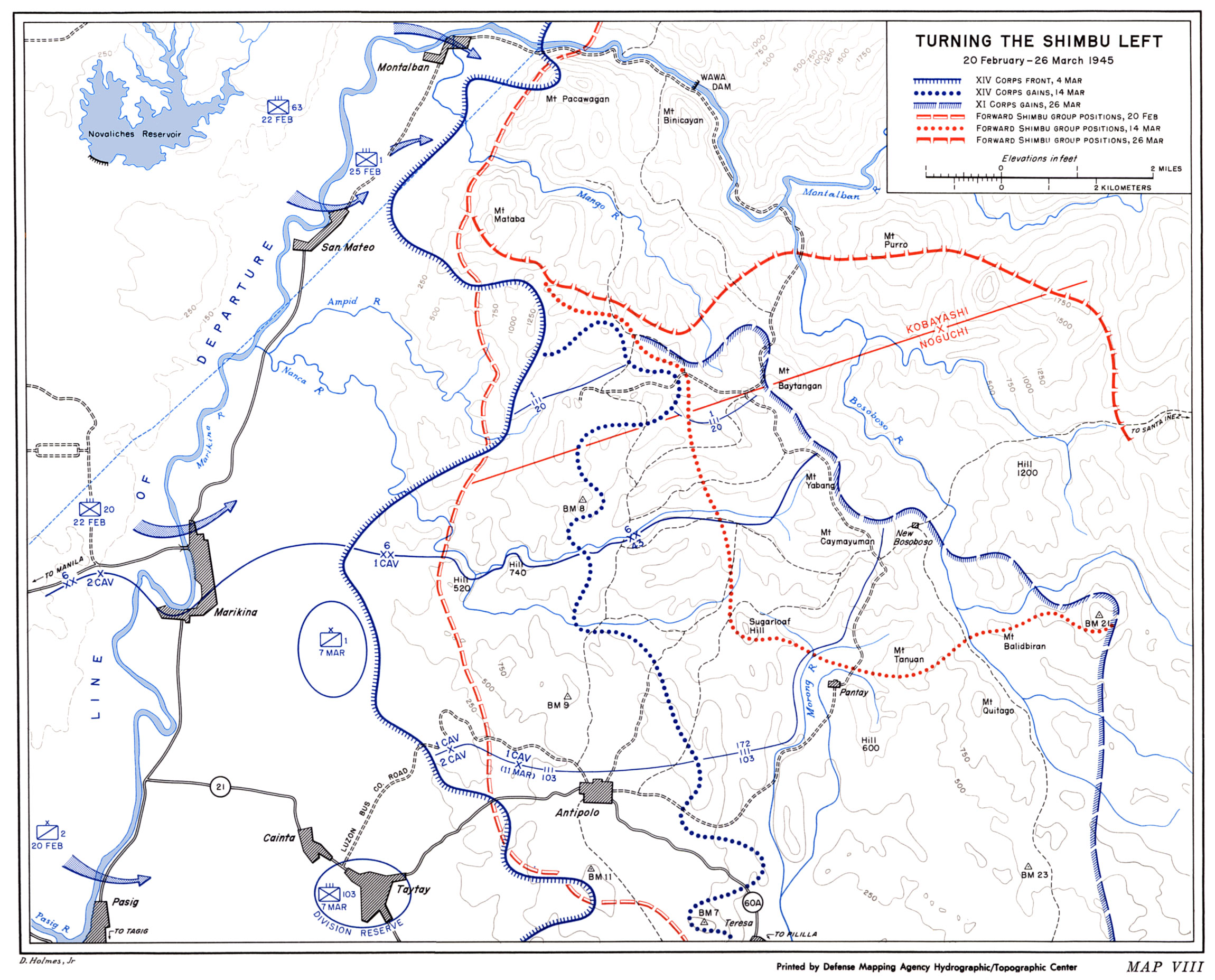
U.S. Sixth Army operations against the Japanese Shimbu Group east of Manila, including the approaches to the city’s water-supply installations.

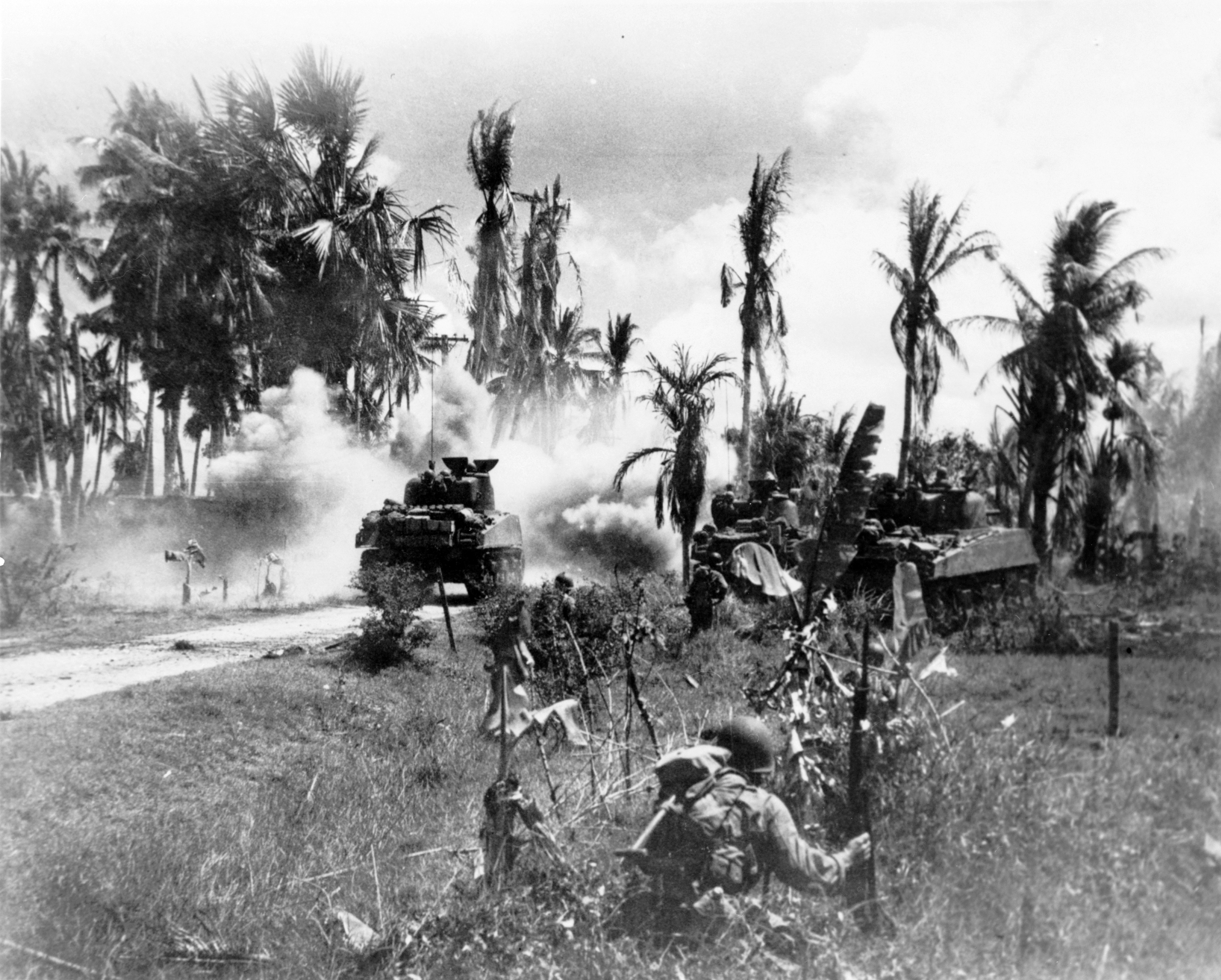
Troops of the 185th Inf., 40th Div., take cover behind advancing tanks while moving up on Japanese positions on Panay Island.

On 15 December 1944, landings against minimal resistance were made on the southern beaches of the island of Mindoro, a key location in the planned Lingayen Gulf operations, in support of major landings scheduled on Luzon. On 9 January 1945, on the south shore of Lingayen Gulf on the western coast of Luzon, General Krueger's Sixth Army landed its first units. Almost 175,000 men came ashore along a twenty-mile (32 km) beachhead within a few days. With heavy air support, Army units pushed inland, taking Clark Field, 40 miles (64 km) northwest of Manila, in the last week of January.

Two more major landings followed, the first to cut off the Bataan Peninsula, and the second to isolate Manila from the south, which included a parachute drop.

=== The U.S. Sixth Army's advance across the Central Luzon plain toward Manila, January–February 1945 ===
Sixth Army advance across Central Luzon, January–February 1945. U.S. Army operational map illustrating the movement south from the Lingayen Gulf beachhead across the Central Luzon plain toward Clark Field and Manila.

Following the landings at Lingayen Gulf on 9 January 1945, Lieutenant General Walter Krueger's Sixth Army established a beachhead on the western coast of Luzon. The operation provided the Allies with a route into the broad Central Luzon plain, the principal overland approach to the Philippine capital. The advance was supported by American naval and air forces and by intelligence and assistance from Filipino guerrillas.

Krueger's army included I Corps, which operated on the eastern side of the advance and faced difficult terrain and Japanese defensive positions, and XIV Corps, which drove southward through the more open plain. The difference in terrain shaped the campaign: Japanese resistance and the need to secure the army's flank slowed operations in the east, while American units advancing along the central road network could move more rapidly toward Manila.

The Japanese commander on Luzon, General Tomoyuki Yamashita, did not concentrate his main army in a decisive defense of the Lingayen beaches. Instead, Japanese forces withdrew into defensive areas in northern and eastern Luzon, while other units remained to contest key approaches and installations. As a result, the American advance combined relatively rapid movements across parts of the plain with localized fighting for roads, towns, bridges, and airfields.

A major intermediate objective was the Clark Field complex near Angeles City, northwest of Manila. U.S. forces secured the airfield area in late January, depriving the Japanese of important air facilities and bringing the Sixth Army closer to the capital. At the same time, other American operations sought to secure the approaches to the Bataan Peninsula and Manila Bay, so that Japanese forces could not threaten the flanks of the advance or obstruct the reopening of the harbor.

By early February, forward elements of the 1st Cavalry Division and other American formations were approaching Manila from the north. On 3 February, cavalry troops entered the city. The rapid advance across the Central Luzon plain thus brought American ground forces to the capital, but it did not end the fighting: the subsequent battle for Manila developed into a separate, destructive urban campaign lasting until 3 March 1945.

The accompanying map shows the Sixth Army's overland approach to Manila; the next subsection covers the fighting inside the city.

=== U.S. Operations to capture Manila, February–March 1945 ===
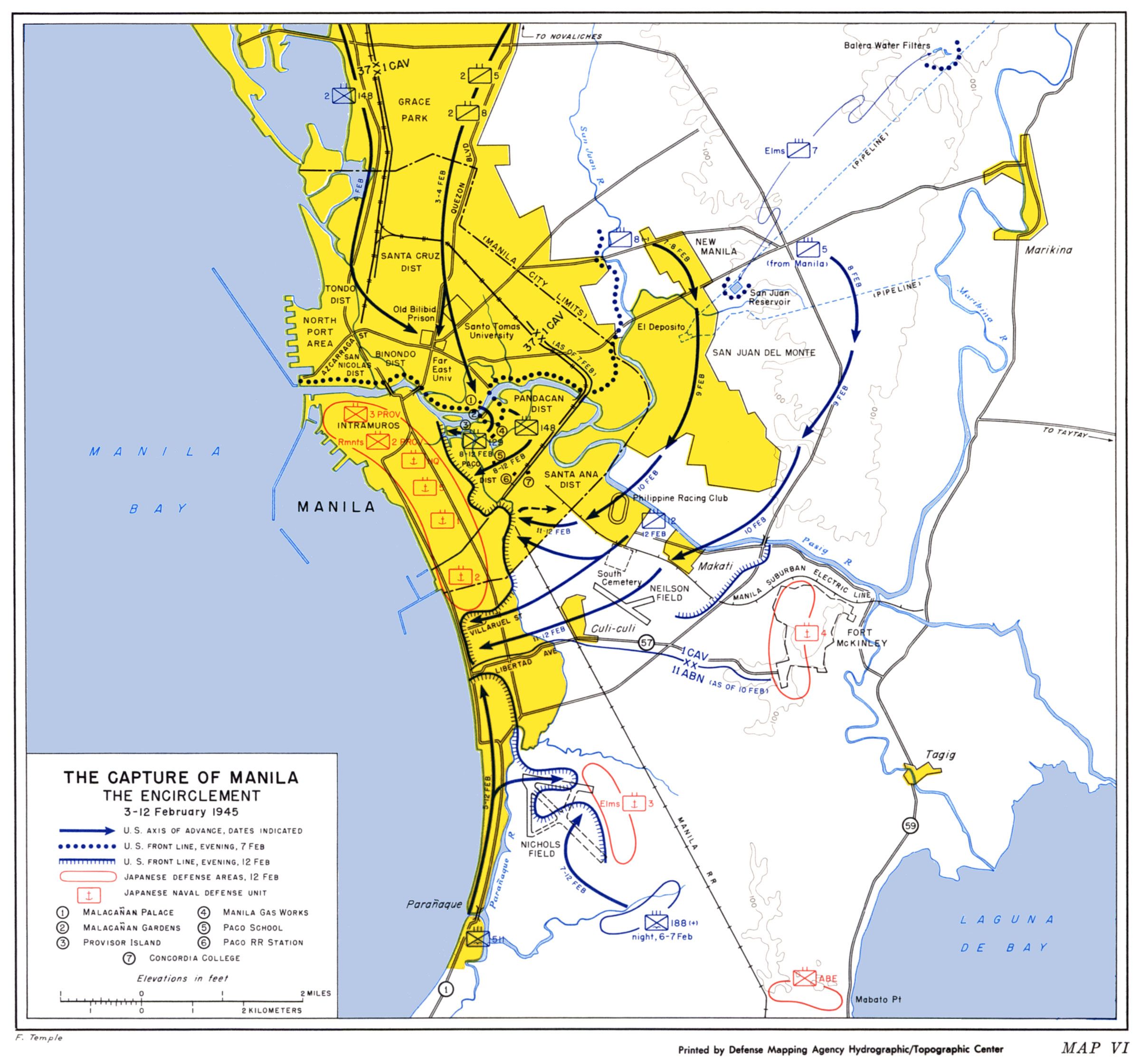
The capture of Manila, February–March 1945. U.S. Army campaign map showing the American approaches to Manila and the advance into the city during the battle to recapture the Philippine capital.

The drive toward Manila followed the Lingayen Gulf landings of 9 January 1945 and the U.S. Sixth Army's advance south across the Central Luzon plain. American forces approached the capital from the north while other Allied operations sought to isolate it from the south. The objective was to retake the Philippine capital and secure the strategically important Manila Bay area.

On 3 February 1945, elements of the U.S. 1st Cavalry Division pushed into the northern outskirts of Manila, and the 8th Cavalry Regiment (organized as infantry) passed through the northern suburbs and into the city itself. U.S. forces entering the city encountered determined resistance, and the operation developed into prolonged urban fighting rather than the rapid liberation initially anticipated.

The battle continued through February, with American troops fighting to clear Japanese-held positions within the city. Manila was declared secured on 3 March 1945. The fighting caused extensive destruction and civilian suffering; the detailed course of the urban battle is covered in Battle of Manila (1945).

As the advance on Manila continued from the north and the south, the Bataan Peninsula was rapidly secured. American forces also prepared to reopen the entrance to Manila Bay by recapturing Corregidor, which had fallen to Japanese forces in May 1942.

Fort Drum, a fortified island in Manila Bay near Corregidor, held out until 13 April, when a team of Army troops went ashore and pumped 3,000 gallons of diesel fuel into the fort, then set off incendiary charges. No Japanese soldiers in Fort Drum survived the subsequent blast and fire.

As the fighting in Manila was coming to a close, the other challenge faced by the newly liberated city was its available water supply. The Shimbu Group under Gen. Shizuo Yokoyama had fortified positions east of Manila in the Sierra Madre mountain range - practically controlling Ipo Dam, Wawa Dam, and its surrounding areas. Without the control of the Ipo Dam, only a third of the necessary amount of water could be supplied to the city. Facing a humanitarian crisis, the XI Corps decided to retake the Ipo Dam and the Wawa Dam. The result was a seesaw battle, and the longest continuous combat engagement in the Southwest Pacific Theater from 28 February to 30 May 1945. Facing the Shimbu Group during the Battle of Wawa Dam and Battle of Ipo Dam was initially the 6th Army's XIV Corps, which would later be replaced by XI Corps. While the fighting took three months, the American forces supported by Filipino guerillas led by Marcos "Marking" Agustin decimated the Shimbu Group, forcing Gen. Yokoyama to withdraw his forces further east deeper into the Sierra Madre Mountains. Soon afterwards, US troops landed at Infanta, cutting off the Shimbu Group from the last settlement of sizable development that they controlled. Up until the end of the war, the guerrillas scoured the Sierra Madre Mountains, hunting down the remnants of the Shimbu Group, who were either hiding out, or trying to make their way north. .

Overall, ten U.S. divisions and five independent regiments battled on Luzon, making it the largest American campaign of the Pacific war, involving more troops than the United States had used in North Africa, Italy, or southern France.

=== American Airborne and Amphibious Ops to Recapture Corregidor, February 1945 ===
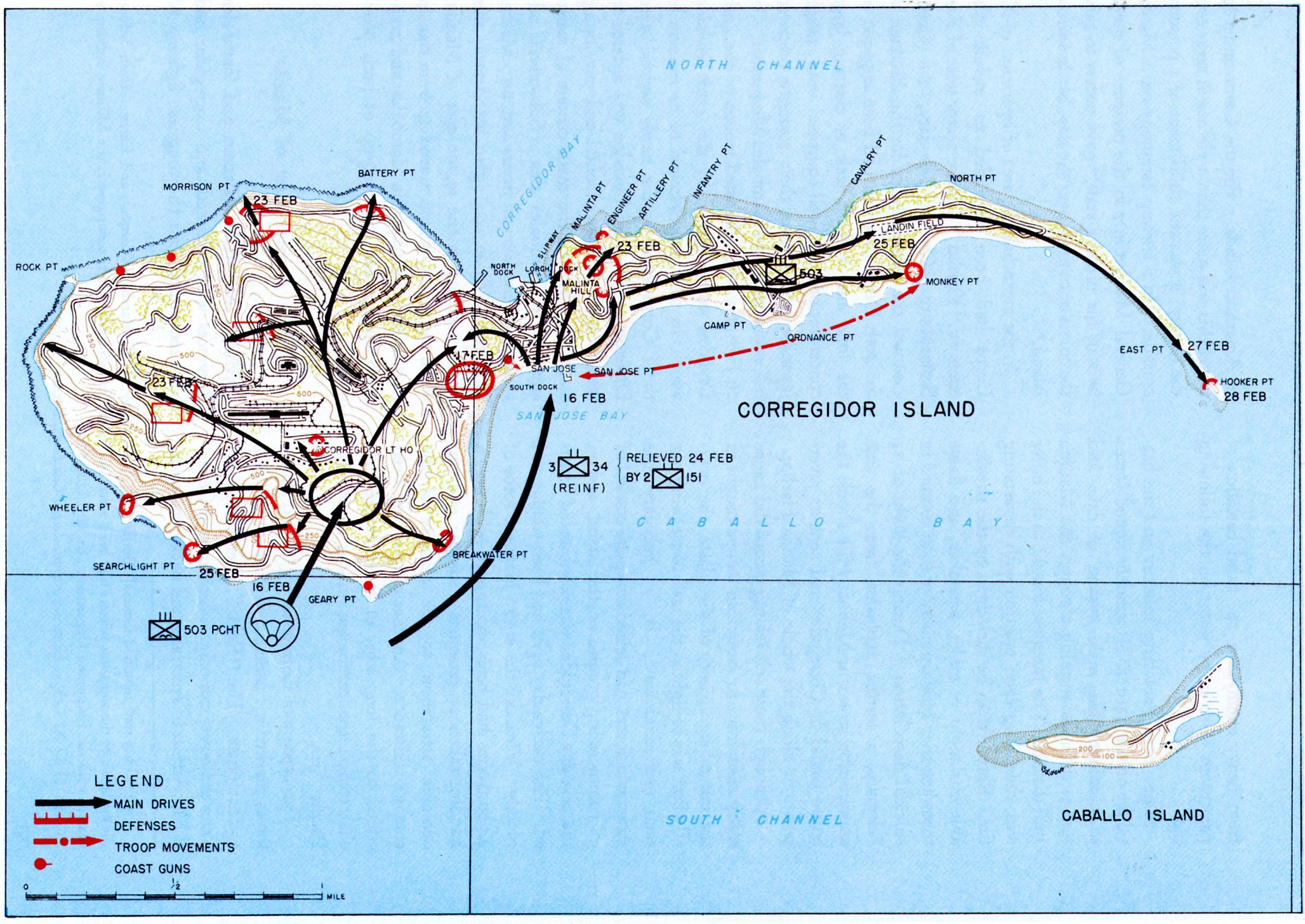
Recapture of Corregidor, 16–28 February 1945. U.S. Army operational map showing the airborne assault on the island’s western Topside plateau, the amphibious landing at San Jose (Black Beach) on the southern shore, and subsequent American advances against Japanese defenses.

Corregidor guarded the entrance to Manila Bay. Its recapture was necessary to remove Japanese positions overlooking the bay approaches and help restore the harbor as a major Allied supply base. The American assault was conducted by Rock Force, commanded by Colonel George M. Jones, and combined parachute infantry, amphibious infantry, engineers, artillery, naval forces, and air support.

On 15 February 1945, elements of the 38th Infantry Division landed at Mariveles, at the southern tip of the Bataan Peninsula, to secure the staging area for an assault across the channel. At approximately 08:30 on 16 February, the first troops of the 503rd Parachute Infantry Regiment began dropping from C-47 transport aircraft onto small drop zones on Corregidor's elevated western plateau, known as Topside. The 503rd was supported by elements of the 462nd Parachute Field Artillery Battalion and the 161st Parachute Engineer Company. Strong winds, limited landing space, and steep cliffs made the airborne assault especially hazardous.

At approximately 10:30 that morning, the reinforced 3rd Battalion, 34th Infantry Regiment, 24th Infantry Division, made an amphibious landing at San Jose Beach, also called Black Beach, on the island's southern shore. Its objectives included securing a beachhead and supply route, seizing the Malinta Hill area, and linking up with the paratroopers on Topside. The combined attacks forced Japanese defenders to fight on separate fronts and enabled American forces to establish positions on both the heights and the shoreline.

Japanese troops continued to resist from tunnels, bunkers, and fortified positions after the initial landings. American units gradually cleared the island during the following days; organized resistance was overcome by the end of February. On 2 March 1945, General Douglas MacArthur returned to Corregidor for a ceremony marking its recapture.

The recapture of Corregidor was distinct from the simultaneous battle for Manila on Luzon, although both operations formed part of the campaign to secure Manila Bay.

== Finishing up the campaign ==
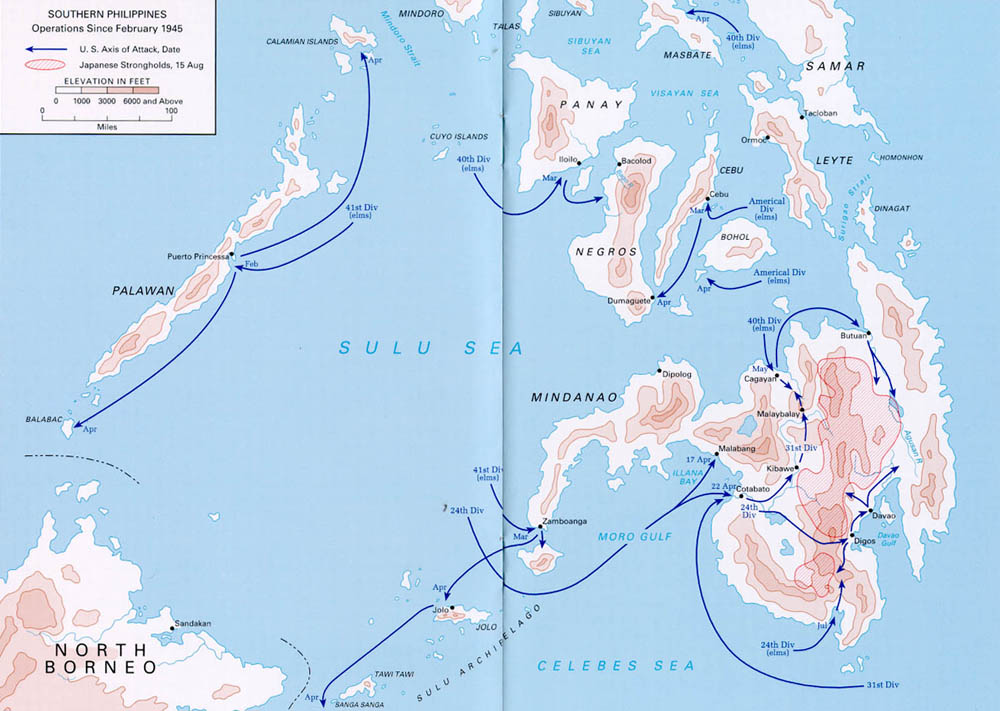
Overview of Allied operations in the central and southern Philippines during 1945, including the campaigns beyond Luzon.

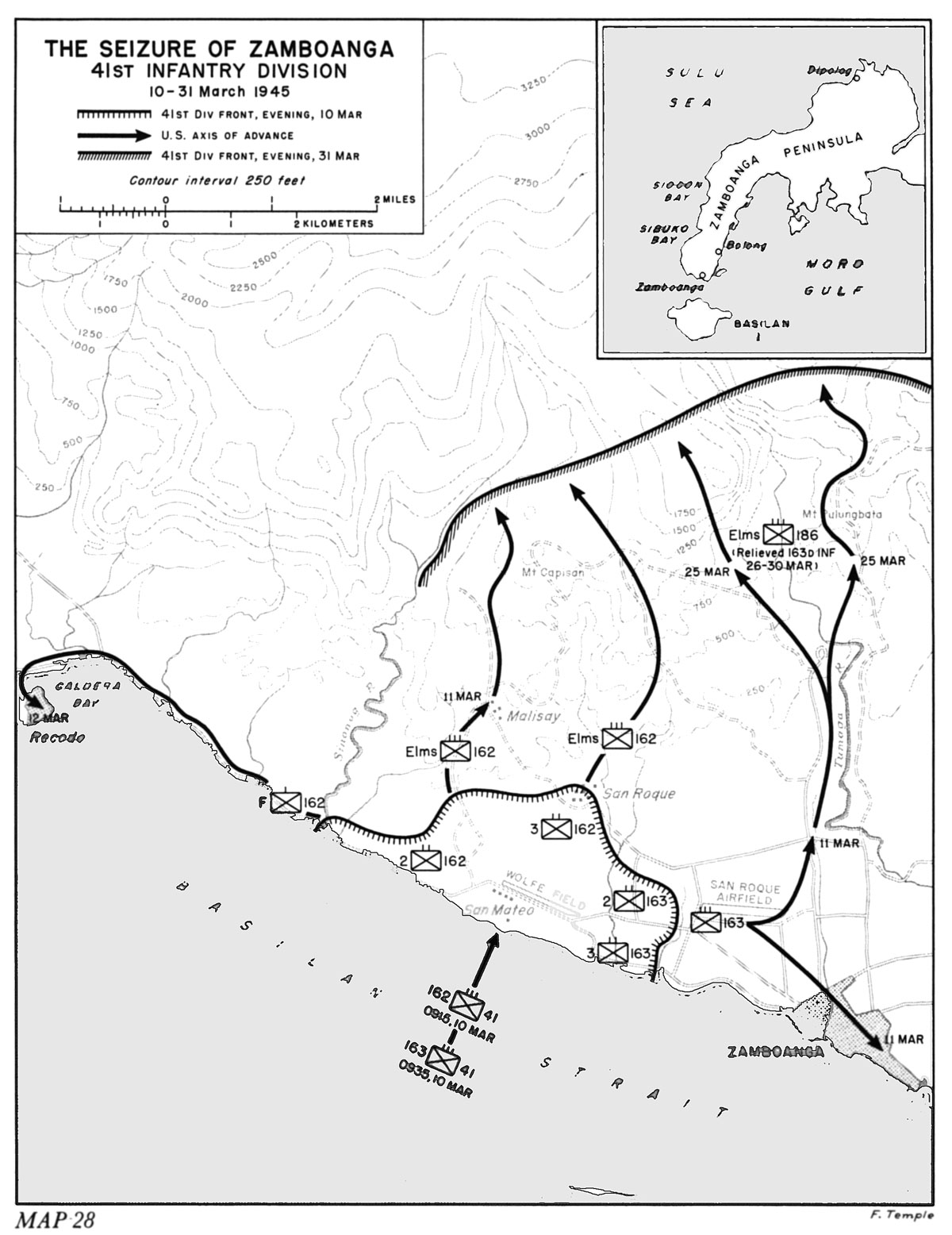
Map of the Allied seizure of Zamboanga on western Mindanao in March 1945, part of the southern Philippines campaign.

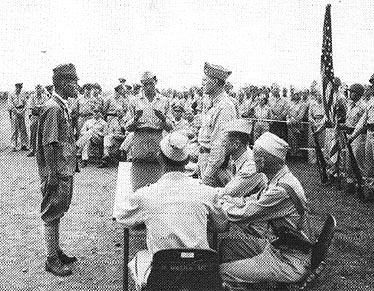
Japanese troops surrender to the 40th Infantry Division.

Palawan Island, between Borneo and Mindoro, the fifth largest and westernmost island of the Philippines, was invaded on February 28, with landings of the Eighth United States Army at Puerto Princesa. The Japanese put up little direct defense of Palawan, but cleaning up pockets of Japanese resistance lasted until late April, with the Japanese withdrawing into the mountains and jungles, dispersed as small units. Throughout the Philippines, U.S. forces were aided by Filipino guerrillas in finding and dispatching Japanese holdouts, the last of whom, Hiroo Onoda, surrendered in 1974, in the mountains of Lubang Island near Mindoro.

The U.S. Eighth Army then moved on to its first landing on Mindanao (17 April), the last of the major islands of the Philippines to be retaken. Mindanao was followed by the invasion and occupation of Panay, Cebu, Negros, and several islands in the Sulu Archipelago. These islands provided bases for the U.S. Fifth and Thirteenth Air Forces to attack targets throughout the Philippines and the South China Sea.

Following additional landings on Mindanao, U.S. Eighth Army troops continued their steady advance against stubborn Japanese resistance. By the end of June, remaining Japanese units were compressed into isolated pockets on Mindanao and Luzon, where fighting continued until the Japanese surrender on 15 August 1945.

== Aftermath ==
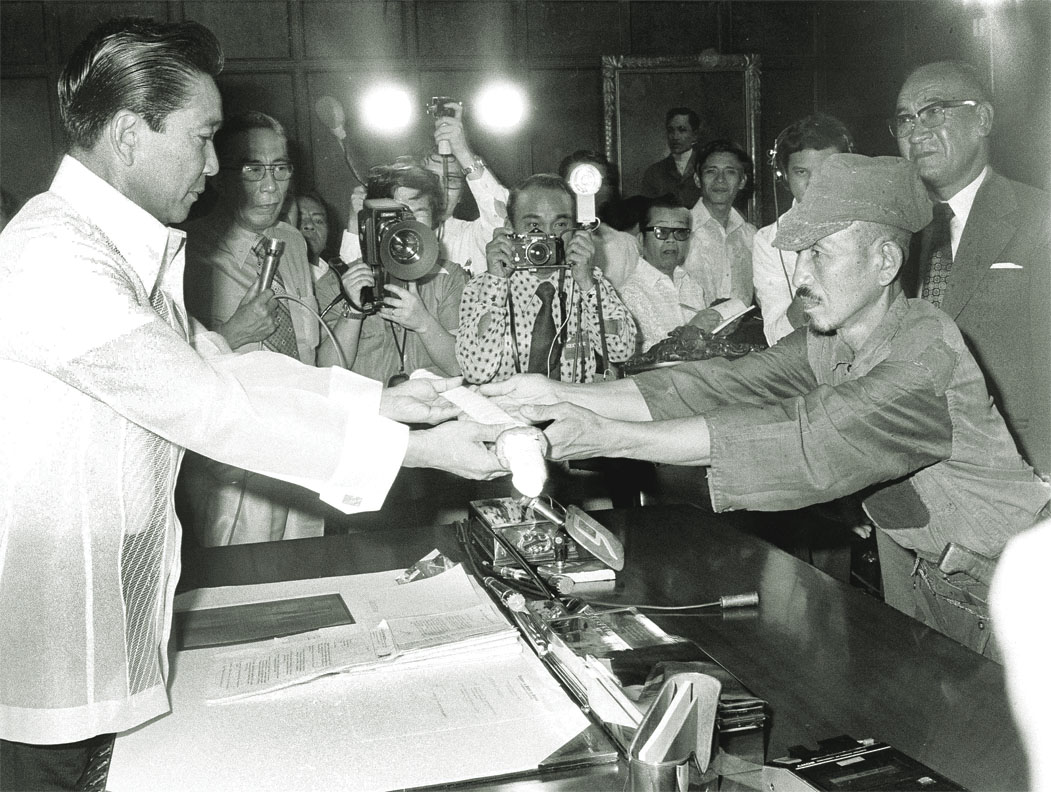
Japanese holdout Lieutenant Hiroo Onoda surrenders to Philippine President Ferdinand Marcos, 11 March 1974

Upon the surrender of Japan, some 45,000 Japanese prisoners of war were taken into custody by American authorities in the Philippines. These POWs were held in a number of camps around the country, and were used as labor for war reparations. Gen. MacArthur formed the Philippine War Crimes Commission, while Pres. Sergio Osmeña formed the National War Crimes Office. Both offices supported each other in the pursuit of war crimes trial in Tokyo, and later on the Philippine War Crimes Trial.

Some units of the Japanese Army were out of radio contact with Tokyo at the time of Japan's surrender, and it was difficult to convince some of them that the war had ended. As a result, several Japanese troops held out for months and even years after the end of hostilities. As at many Pacific Islands with Japanese holdouts, major Japanese officials, including members of the Imperial Family, visited in person to convince the soldiers that they must surrender by order of the Emperor. The final Japanese holdout in the Philippines surrendered in 1974.

== Casualties ==
U.S. Army and Army Air Forces

Location	Killed	Wounded	Total
Leyte	3,504	11,991	15,495
Luzon	8,310	29,560	37,870
Central and Southern Philippines	2,070	6,990	9,060
Total	13,884	48,541	62,425

Japanese

Location	Killed (Note: Includes battle and nonbattle deaths)	Captured	Total
Leyte	65,000	828	65,828
Luzon	205,535	9,050	214,585
Central and Southern Philippines	50,260	2,695	52,955
Total	320,795	12,573	333,368

In addition it is estimated that a million Filipino civilians were killed in the Philippines campaign.

Japanese nurse Tsuki Suzuki revealed she found out that Japanese military nurses in the Philippines were euthanised against their will by the Japanese military when they fell ill and they begged not to be euthanised, but the Japanese military euthanised them anyway and lied, saying they perished in battle against the US to their families. Kikue Kobayashi also reported that ill Japanese nurses being killed by the Japanese army in the Philippines and she was forced to live off wild plants, leaves and potato vines and use tree branches to walk and their swollen feet could no longer fit their shoes.

== See also ==
- Battle of Villa Verde Trail
- Dalton Pass
- Philippine Liberation Medal
- Battle of Manila (1945)

== Bibliography ==
- Breuer, William B. (1986). Retaking The Philippines: America's Return to Corregidor & Bataan, 1944–1945. St Martin's Press. ISBN 9780312678029. ASIN B000IN7D3Q.
- Huggins, Mark (May–June 1999). "Setting Sun: Japanese Air Defence of the Philippines 1944–1945". Air Enthusiast (81): 28–35. ISSN 0143-5450.
- Leary, William M. (2004). We Shall Return!: MacArthur's Commanders and the Defeat of Japan, 1942–1945. University Press of Kentucky. ISBN 0-8131-9105-X.
- "Chapter IX: The Mindoro and Luzon Operations". Reports of General MacArthur: The Campaigns of MacArthur in the Pacific: Volume I. Library of Congress: Department of the Army. pp. 242–294. Archived from the original on 16 January 2014.
- Mellnik, Stephen Michael (1981). Philippine War Diary, 1939–1945. Van Nostrand Reinhold. ISBN 0-442-21258-5.
- Morison, Samuel Eliot (2011) [1958]. Leyte: June 1944 - Jan 1945. History of United States Naval Operations in World War II. Vol. 12. Annapolis: Naval Institute Press. ISBN 978-1-59114-535-6.
- Morison, Samuel Eliot (2001). The Liberation of the Philippines: Luzon, Mindanao, the Visayas 1944–1945, vol. 13 of History of United States Naval Operations in World War II (Reissue ed.). Castle Books. ISBN 0-7858-1314-4.
- Norling, Bernard (2005). The Intrepid Guerrillas of North Luzon. University Press of Kentucky. ISBN 0-8131-9134-3.
- Smith, Robert Ross (2005). Triumph in the Philippines: The War in the Pacific. University Press of the Pacific. ISBN 1-4102-2495-3.
