= Battle of Visayas =

1945 battle in Visayas

- Part of the Pacific theater of World War II
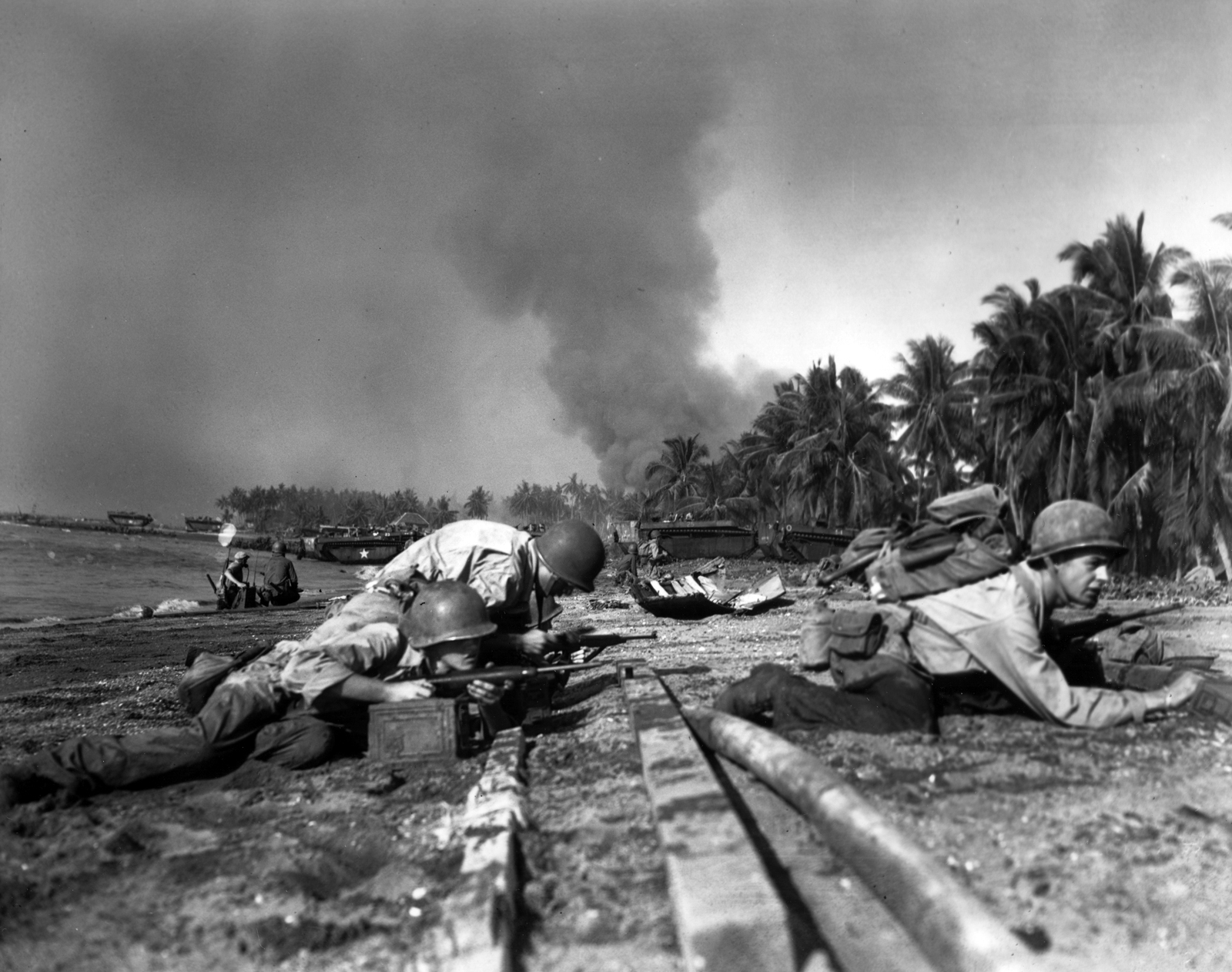
- U.S. soldiers during landings at Talisay Beach, Cebu Island, 26 March 1945. U.S. National Archives
Date	18 March – 15 August 1945
Location	Visayas region, Philippines
Result	Allied victory

Belligerents
United States: Commonwealth of the Philippines	Japan: Second Philippine Republic

Commanders and leaders
(United States) Robert L. Eichelberger (United States) Rapp Brush (United States) William H. Arnold (United States) James M. Cushing (Commonwealth of the Philippines) Macario P. Peralta Jr. (Commonwealth of the Philippines) Ruperto Kangleon	(Empire of Japan) Sōsaku Suzuki † (Empire of Japan) Takeo Manjome

Strength
17,000 U.S. troops 18,500 Filipino guerrillas	32,000 Japanese troops

Casualties and losses
835 killed 1,905 wounded	14,300 killed 1,230 wounded

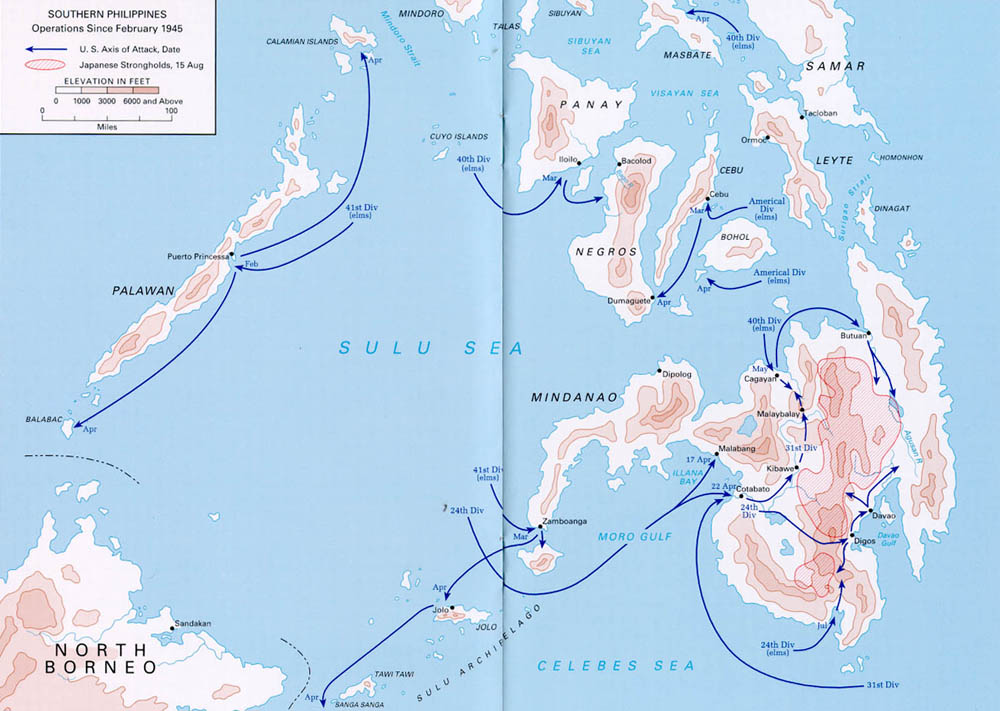
Map of U.S. operations in Southern Philippines, 1945

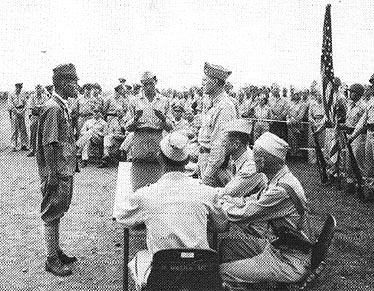
Japanese troops surrender to the 40th Division, September 1945

The Battle of Visayas (Filipino: Labanan sa Visayas; Visayan languages: Gubat sa Kabisay-an) was fought by U.S. forces and Filipino guerrillas against the Japanese from 18 March – 15 August 1945, in a series of actions officially designated as Operations Victor I and II, and part of the campaign for the liberation of the Philippines during World War II. The battle was waged to complete the recapture of the central portions south of the archipelago and secure them from remaining Japanese forces.

== Background ==
Within two weeks of ordering the seizure of Palawan and the Zamboanga peninsula, General Douglas MacArthur directed the capture of the isolated Visayan islands of Panay, Negros, Cebu, and Bohol in the central Philippines.

With Filipino guerrillas controlling most of the countryside in these islands, some thirty thousand Japanese troops held the vital coastal towns including Cebu City on Cebu island and Iloilo City on Panay, among the largest cities in the Philippines. Aside from fulfilling his desire and promise to clear the Japanese from the islands, Gen. MacArthur wanted these two port cities as vital staging points for the expected large numbers of troops scheduled for the invasion of the Japanese mainland. Earlier, the United States Armed Forces Joint Chiefs of Staff had told him to be prepared to stage twenty-two divisions for the mainland operation at bases across the Philippines by November 1945, with another eleven to follow by February 1946.

== Battle ==
=== Operation VICTOR I ===
Two areas of operations were suggested to divide the entire region, given the mountainous terrain of Negros, a dominant terrain feature that ran north to south of the island, and the planners chose to seize the western portion, including Northwestern Negros and Panay island, which was named VICTOR I. Lieutenant General Robert L. Eichelberger, the Eighth Army commander, appointed the 40th Infantry Division, a California National Guard formation and veterans of the recent fighting in Luzon under Major General Rapp Brush, with the 503rd Parachute Regimental Combat Team in reserve.

Panay Island was the first objective. On 18 March 1945, within two weeks of aerial bombardment on Japanese positions, the 40th Infantry Division, spearheaded by the 185th Infantry Regiment landed unopposed at Tigbauan district, several miles south of Iloilo City, where a 23,000 strong guerrilla force had secured most of Panay, under Colonel Macario Peralta. Recalled General Eichelberger: "Filipino guerrillas stood stiff, resplendent in starched khaki uniforms and ornaments and decked in battle gear".

The regiment proceeded to seize the airfield at Barrio Tiring, Cabatuan, Iloilo. (Note: This airfield was called the Tiring Landing Field by the Free Panay Civil Government of Governor Thomas Confesor and the Panay guerillas of Col. Peralta, the Cabatuan Airfield by the Japanese Forces, and the Tiring Airfield by the American Forces. By mistake, the Americans also called it the Santa Barbara Airfield even though it is not located in Santa Barbara. The Americans were apparently cognizant of the error that they usually write "(Tiring)" next to the name. It is worth noting that there is no Barrio Tiring in the neighboring town of Santa Barbara, only in Cabatuan. Other writers who do not know the geography of the place may have added to the error by simply assuming that an airfield mistakenly called Santa Barbara is located in a place called Santa Barbara, even though it is actually located in Cabatuan, Iloilo.) The Iloilo International Airport is currently located on the same area in Cabatuan, Iloilo.

The regiment also proceeded to seize the airfield at Mandurriao district. The Japanese were holed up in Iloilo City, and the 40th Division easily swept these Japanese outposts in two days. Mopping up operations by the guerrillas and 2nd Battalion of the 160th Infantry Regiment continued, and at war's end, some 1,500 Japanese troops surrendered.

Guimaras and Inampulagan islands, between Panay and Negros, were seized on the same day Iloilo fell, 20 March and the next day, respectively with no opposition.

=== Seizure of Negros ===
On 29 March, a reinforced platoon from Company F, 185th Infantry under First Lieutenant Aaron H. Hanson slipped ashore ahead of the main landings to be staged near Bacolod, seized the 650-foot steel truss Bago River bridge, which separated Pandan Point from the city itself, a vital link in supporting movement of heavy weapons and equipment. The Japanese guards were surprised, and the bridge was secured for several hours before reinforcements arrived.

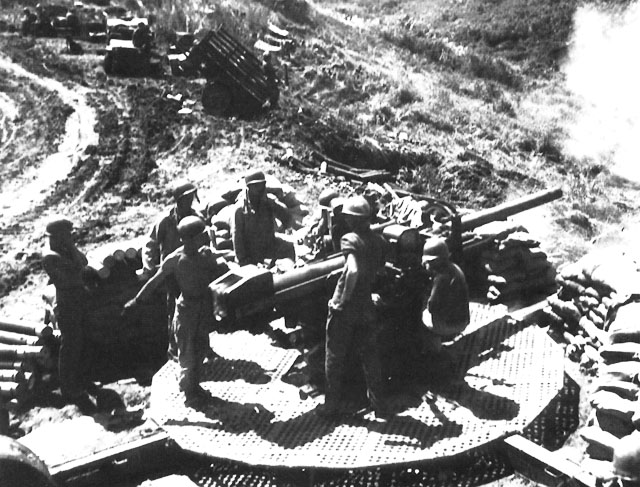
U.S. artillery in action on Negros island, April 1945

The sudden seizure of the Bago river bridge easily allowed the 185th Infantry Regiment to land at Pulupandan unopposed, then they advanced rapidly, seizing seven more bridges in turn, and finally captured Bacolod the next day 30 March, mostly because the Japanese did not contest the beach landings; with the use of artillery, they could have inflicted numerous casualties. The 40th Division pushed farther inland and toward Talisay, where Japanese forces tried to disrupt its advance with delaying actions, but the Americans simply overwhelmed these, and on 2 April, the coastal plain of Negros was in Allied hands.

On 9 April, all three regiments of the 40th Division pushed east into the rugged, mountainous interior of the island. The Japanese resisted stubbornly, aided by booby-trapped terrain, defended their fortified positions by day, and conducted harassing attacks at night. Soon, the 40th Division started using small infiltrating units to creep past tank traps and minefields, then scrambled uphill across open fields of fire to attack Japanese positions. On 23 May, at Hacienda San Jose, San Carlos, Medal of Honor awardee, Staff Sergeant John C. Sjogren of Company I, 160th Infantry, led one such attack on a ridgetop entrenchment, and despite being wounded by gunfire, had accounted for some forty-three Japanese casualties, destroyed nine pillboxes, as he cleared the way for his comrades to follow. Sjorgen's unit, Company I, subsequently received a Presidential Unit Citation for its heroic action.

By 4 June, the Japanese began a general withdrawal, retreating further into the unexplored mountains of Negros. Eight weeks later, the 40th Division overcame these final defenses and scattered the rest of the Japanese into the jungle.

=== Operation VICTOR II ===
About a week into the Panay and northwestern Negros operations, Operation VICTOR II, the seizure of Cebu, Bohol, and southeastern Negros, was underway. The Americal Division under Major General William Howard Arnold was tasked by General Eichelberger for the operation. Some 14,500 Japanese troops held Cebu, but 2,000 Japanese soldiers under Major General Takeo Manjome were contained in northern Cebu by about 8,500 guerrillas under Lieutenant Colonel James M. Cushing. One-third of the Japanese forces in Cebu were combat-ready, with an extensive network of formidable defensive positions around the city.

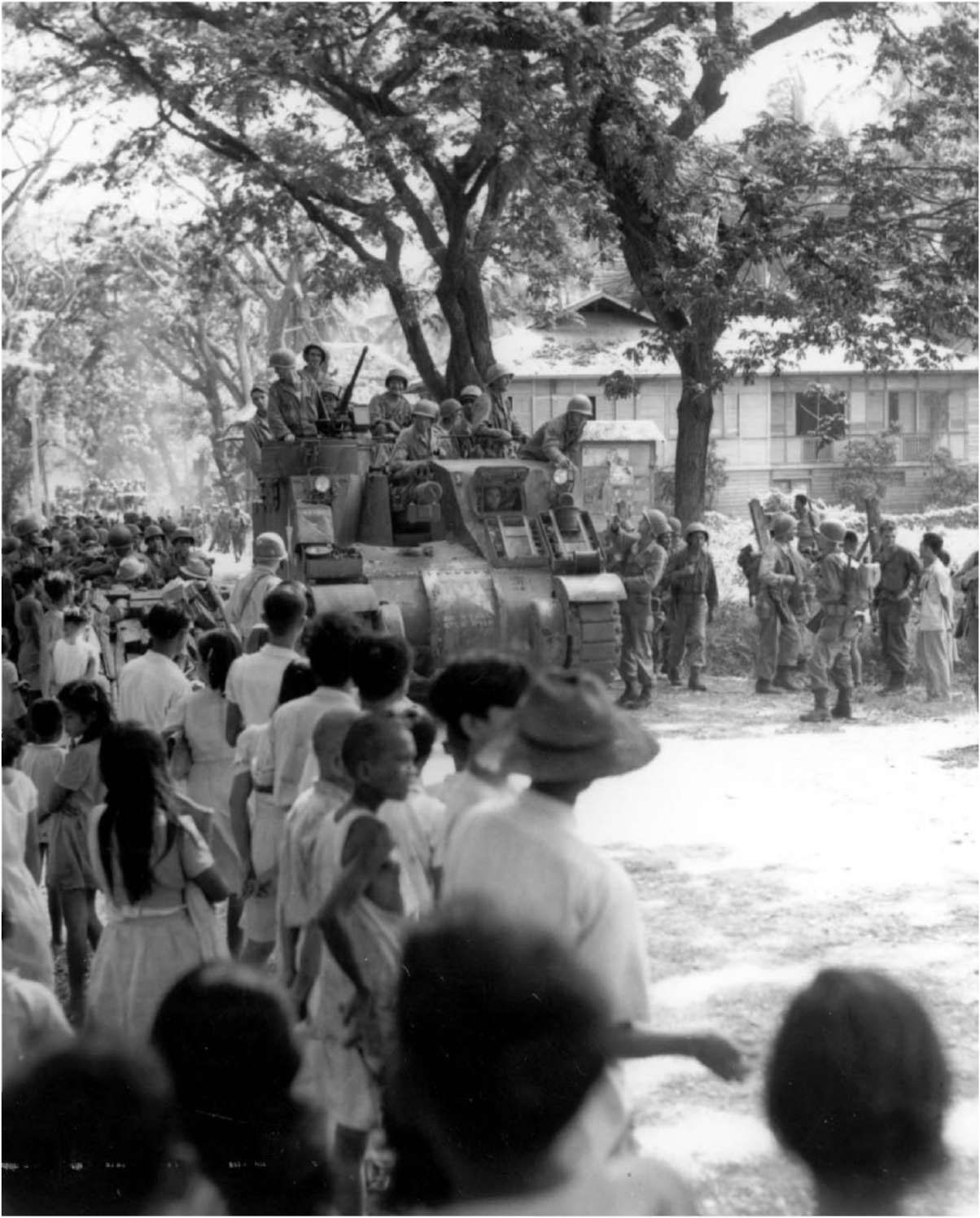
Cebu City residents greet U.S. troops

On 26 March 1945, at 08:28 on Talisay Beach, four miles (6.5 km) west of Cebu City, the 182nd Infantry and 132nd Infantry landed on the west and east, respectively, after an hour-long naval bombardment. Japanese resistance was light, but Japanese mines destroyed ten of the first fifteen landing tracked vehicles that moved ashore, effectively stopping the advance. Subsequent landing waves stacked up behind the first that created a large traffic jam, but the Japanese did not exploit this easy target. Some two hours later, the traffic lessened as troops cautiously picked their way through the dense minefield, and pontoons were later used to circumvent the mine barriers.

The next day, 27 March, the Americal Division moved into already devastated Cebu City, as the Americans began a rapid advance. On 28 March, Lahug airfield, two miles northeast of Cebu was seized, as Arnold's troops began to confront two heavily defended Japanese positions in the outpost line, capturing one on the same day. The 182nd Infantry continued its attack the following day, then the Japanese detonated an ammunition dump on the second hill, with one 182nd company sustaining fifty killed or wounded in the explosion. In the succeeding days, savage resistance continued in the Japanese lines around the city, and as the Americal Division grimly assaulted individual positions with tank-infantry teams and with crucial fire support from offshore Seventh Fleet destroyers, the Japanese slowly gave ground.

On 13 April, previously with a plan to envelop the Japanese right flank, General Arnold secretly sent his returning regiment, the 164th Infantry, into night marches twenty-five miles (40 km) to the west, well behind the Japanese lines, and with all three regiments, the 182nd and 132nd in front and the 164th from the rear attacking simultaneously, the Japanese were forced to withdraw. With the continued presence of air and artillery fire, General Manjome realized that his entire force would surely be annihilated, and he ordered a retreat into the mountainous northern reaches of Cebu on 16 April. Pursuit operations began on 20 April, and together with Cushing's guerrillas, killed any Japanese who turned to fight. Some 8,500 Japanese troops remained holed up in northern Cebu until the end of the war.

=== Capture of Bohol and Southeastern Negros ===
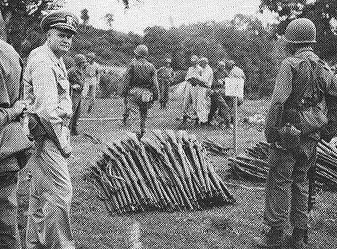
Japanese weapons collected, 1945

On 11 April 1945, well before the fighting in Cebu subsided, the Americal Division went to action elsewhere, as Bohol island and southeastern Negros became the next targets, when a battalion of the 164th Infantry landed on Tagbilaran on Bohol's western coast. With the assistance of local guerrilla forces led by Major Ingeniero, the battalion pushed inland, located the defenders and cleared the island of Japanese resistance by the end of the month, at a cost of seven men killed.

On 26 April, remnants of the 164th went ashore at Sibulan, some five miles (8 km) north of Dumaguete, rendezvoused with a Reconnaissance Troop of the 40th Division, and in two days, attacked the 1,300 strong Japanese force entrenched in forbidding hill positions surrounding Dumaguete. Major combat operations continued until 28 May 1945, when the Japanese positions fell and Filipino guerrillas assumed responsibility for mopping up operations. The 164th Infantry suffered thirty five men killed and 180 wounded in southeastern Negros, while the Japanese lost 350 men and fifteen were captured.

== Aftermath ==
Overall, the Visayas operations of the U.S. Eighth Army suffered relatively light casualties in comparison to Japanese figures. The 40th Division in Panay and northeastern Negros suffered 390 killed and 1,025 wounded with the Japanese sustaining 4,080 killed with another 3,300 succumbed to disease and starvation. The Americal Division at Cebu and Bohol suffered 417 killed and 1,700 wounded, with Japan sustaining 5,750 killed and 500 wounded.

Though some Japanese units had survived deep in the mountains, General Eichelberger's units had clearly liberated the entire Visayas. General MacArthur was particularly pleased with his subordinate's fast-moving and decisive operations against the slow, methodical fighting of the Sixth Army in Luzon. On 21 April 1945, he termed Eichelberger's Visayas operations on the congratulatory cable were a "model of what a light but aggressive campaign can accomplish in rapid exploitation".

== See also ==
- Military history of the Philippines during World War II
- Military history of the United States
- Military history of Japan
- History of the Philippines
- List of American guerrillas in the Philippines
