= Thirty-Fifth Army (Japan) =

Japanese Thirty-Fifth Army
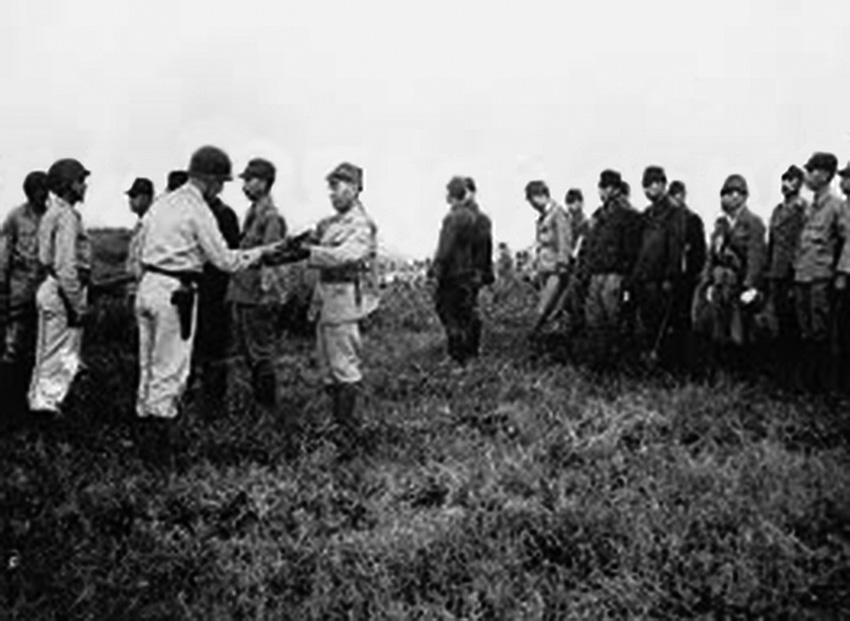
- Surrender of Lt. General Kataoka Tadasu, highest ranking officer of Imperial Japanese 35th Army on Cebu, August 19, 1945
- Active: July 26, 1944 - April 14, 1945
- Country: Empire of Japan
- Branch: Imperial Japanese Army
- Type: Infantry
- Role: Corps
- Nicknames: Sho (尚, Lasting)

The Japanese 35th Army (第35軍, Dai-sanjyūgo gun) was an army of the Imperial Japanese Army during the final days of World War II.

== History ==
The Japanese 35th Army was raised on July 26, 1944, in the Japanese-occupied Philippines in anticipation of Allied attempts to invade and retake Mindanao and the Visayan islands in central and southern Philippines. It was under the overall command of the Japanese Fourteenth Area Army. Initially intended as a garrison force to withstand a long-term war of attrition, as the war situation on the Pacific front grew increasingly desperate for Japan, the Imperial General Headquarters ordered the bulk of the IJA 35th Army to Leyte as reinforcement to Japanese forces in the Battle of Leyte to fight against the combined American and Philippine Commonwealth troops. As the battle was lost, surviving units were given independent command authority, and were ordered to go to ground and wage a guerilla campaign on their respective islands for as long as possible. The IJA 35th Army was officially disbanded on April 19, 1945. Some individual Japanese stragglers did not give up until the 1970s.

== List of commanders ==
=== Commanding Officer ===
	Name	From	To
1	General Sōsaku Suzuki	28 July 1944	19 April 1945

=== Chief of Staff ===
	Name	From	To
1	Major General Yoshiharu Tomochika	28 July 1944	14 November 1944
2	Lieutenant General Takaji Wachi	14 November 1944	20 February 1945
3	Major General Yoshiharu Tomochika	20 February 1945	19 April 1945

== Structure ==
Japanese 35th Army

- 16th Infantry Division
- 30th Infantry Division
- 100th Infantry Division
- 102nd Infantry Division
- IJA 54th Independent Mixed Brigade
