= Takaji Wachi =

Japanese officer, war criminal (1893–1978)

- 和知 鷹二
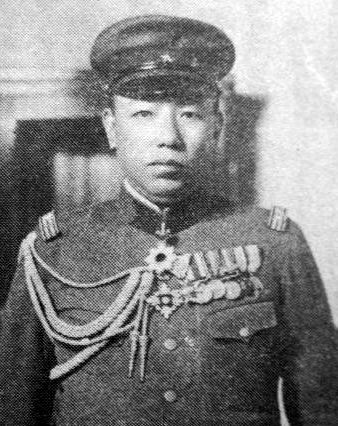
- Born: February 1, 1893; Hiroshima Prefecture, Japan
- Died: October 30, 1978 (aged 85); Japan
- Military career
- Allegiance: Empire of Japan
- Branch: Imperial Japanese Army
- Service years: 1914 – 1945
- Rank: Lieutenant General
- Conflicts: Second Sino-Japanese War; World War II

Takaji Wachi (和知 鷹二, Wachi Takaji; 1 February 1893 – 30 October 1978) was a lieutenant general in the Imperial Japanese Army during the Second Sino-Japanese War and World War II.

== Biography ==
Wachi was a native of Hiroshima Prefecture, and the second son of a former samurai retainer of Karatsu Domain and colonel in the Imperial Japanese Army. He attended military preparatory schools in Hiroshima and was a graduate of the 21st class of the Imperial Japanese Army Academy in 1914. In 1922, he graduated from the 34th class of the Army Staff College.

Wachi specialized in Chinese studies and was fluent in the Chinese language. He was assigned as military attaché to southern China from 1925 to 1927, as resident officer in Jinan from 1928 to 1929 under the IJA 6th Division during the Jinan Incident. Afterwards, he served as a staff officer to the Kwantung Army from 1931 to 1932, as a resident officer in Canton from 1932 to 1934, and as head of the Taiyuan Special Agency from 1935 to 1936 under the aegis of the Japanese China Garrison Army. Wachi encouraged warlords in south China, especially Guangxi province, to revolt against the Kuomintang government of Chiang Kai-shek based in Nanjing. His main targets were Li Zongren and Xing Zhanfei, but his efforts to create a collaborationist state in south China were ultimately not successful.

Wachi became a colonel in 1937, and was assigned to command the IJA 44th Infantry Regiment of the Kwantung Army during the Battle of Shanghai. Some historians hold him to be one of the prime instigators of the Marco Polo Bridge Incident of 1 July 1937. He remained in China after start of the Second Sino-Japanese War in 1937 attached to the Japanese China Garrison Army staff. Wachi engaged in efforts to negotiate with the Chinese to end the war and tried to communicate with General He Yingqin, the National Revolutionary Army Chief of Staff, via a Chinese agent in 1938, but these efforts failed.

Wachi was transferred to Taiwan in 1938, and back to Japan, where he was assigned to the Imperial Japanese Army General Staff from 1938 to 1939. He returned to China from 1939 to 1940 on the staff of the Central China Expeditionary Army. Promoted to major general in 1940, he returned to Taiwan in 1941 as chief-of-staff of the Taiwan Army, while simultaneously heading its Research Division, which was studying issues related to land warfare in Southeast Asia. At the time the commander of the Taiwan Army was General Masaharu Homma. Wachi would later testify that even as late as March 1941, both he and Homma felt that a war between Japan the United States and the United Kingdom would break out before the end of the year, and that he had still hoped at this time that Japan and China would somehow still be able to ally against the threat of the Soviet Union to the north.

In February 1942, Wachi was transferred to become chief-of-staff of the IJA 14th Army in the Philippines, which participated in the final assault on the American fortress island of Corregidor. He was promoted to lieutenant general in 1943. In March 1944, he became Deputy Chief of Staff of the Southern Expeditionary Army, and subsequently Chief of Staff of the IJA 35th Army fighting on Leyte that November. Wachi was ordered back to the Japanese home islands after the loss of the Philippines to Allied forces in 1945, and was assigned to command the Kempeitai in Hiroshima – considerable demotion. He retired from active military service in 1945.

After the surrender of Japan, Wachi was arrested by the American occupation authorities and charged with war crimes in connection with the actions of Japanese military personnel in the Philippines. The charges were that he'd unlawfully transported soldiers and munitions on Red Cross ships. Wachi was convicted by a military tribunal in Yokohama and sentenced to six years at hard labor at Sugamo Prison. He was released on parole in 1950. Wachi died in 1978.
