= James M. Cushing =

US Army officer (1910-1963)

Lieutenant Colonel James M. Cushing (circa 1910 – August 26, 1963) was a mining engineer in US Army who commanded the Philippine resistance against Japan on Cebu Island in the Philippines during World War II.

== Early life ==
James McCloud Cushing was born at Guadalajara, Mexico, about 1910. In 1920, the family was living in El Paso, Texas, and ten year-old "Jimmie's" native tongue was listed as Spanish.

== Military ==
Distinguished Service Cross

Cushing's forces in the Cebu Area Command numbered about 8,500. In early 1944, he was instrumental in the Koga affair in which the Z Plan of the Imperial Japanese Navy was recovered by his guerrillas. Cushing traded Japanese admiral Shigeru Fukudome and other survivors of a plane crash (but not the captured Z Plan) for the assurance that Japanese forces on Cebu would stop murdering civilians; a promise which the Japanese kept. In 1945, he was awarded the Distinguished Service Cross.

== Post war ==
Cushing survived the war and continued living in the Philippines. On August 26, 1963, he and his wife Wilfreda Alao (Sabando) Cushing were on an inter-island transport en route to Mindoro Island from where they lived at TayTay, Palawan Island, when he succumbed to a heart attack. He was 53 years old. Colonel Cushing was interred in Libingan ng mga Bayani (Heroes' Cemetery) in Manila.

== See also ==
- List of American guerrillas in the Philippines
- Battle of the Visayas
