= 102nd Division (Imperial Japanese Army) =

- 第102師団
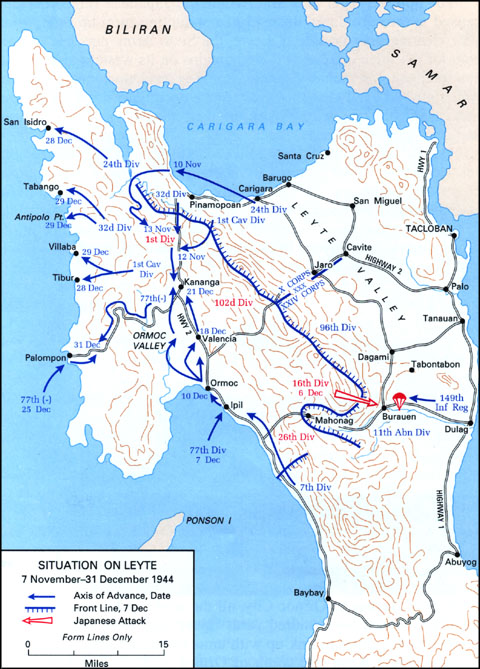
- Battle of Leyte, situation 7 November to 31 December 1944.
- Active: 1944 - 1945
- Country: Empire of Japan
- Branch: Imperial Japanese Army
- Type: Infantry
- Garrison/HQ: Kumamoto
- Nickname: Uproot division
- Engagements: Battle of Leyte; Battle of the Visayas; Invasion of Palawan; Battle for Cebu City

The 102nd Division (第102師団, Dai-hyakuni Shidan) was an infantry division of the Imperial Japanese Army. Its call sign was the Uproot Division (抜兵団, Hatsu Heidan).The division was formed on 15 June 1944 in Visayas. The nucleus of the formation was the 31st Independent Mixed Brigade. The 102nd division was a Type C(hei) security division, therefore the division backbone comprised independent infantry battalions instead of infantry regiments.

== Action ==
On 29 July 1944, parts of the division perished when the Yoshino Maru transport was sunk by a US submarine. The rest of the 102nd division was assembled in Ormoc on 26 October 1944, as the Battle of Leyte has begun since 17 October 1944.

In the course of the Battle of Leyte and subsequent Battle of the Visayas since March 1945, the garrisons of the 102nd division were isolated and increasingly decimated by the US forces. Some sub-units have managed to hold on in mountains until the surrender of Japan 15 August 1945 though.

In particular, during the Invasion of Palawan in March–April 1945, the two battalions of the 102nd division were defeated by the US 186th regimental combat team. The Japanese garrison of Panay, consisting of a single company, retreated to the mountains and survived relatively intact despite efforts of US 185th regimental combat team.

On Cebu, the 102nd division had a single battalion and an assortment of people rescued from Leyte. They suffered heavy casualties during the Battle for Cebu City but was able to continue a guerilla warfare afterwards.

On Negros island, the 102nd division had about 4000 personnel from 77th infantry brigade. These survived after a guerilla campaign against invading US forces since March 1945.

== See also ==
- List of Japanese Infantry Divisions
- Independent Mixed Brigades (Imperial Japanese Army)

== Notes and references ==
- This article incorporates material from Japanese Wikipedia page 第102師団 (日本軍), accessed 14 June 2016
- Madej, W. Victor. Japanese Armed Forces Order of Battle, 1937-1945 [2 vols] Allentown, PA: 1981
