= Sōsaku Suzuki =

Japanese army officer (1891–1945)

- 鈴木 宗作
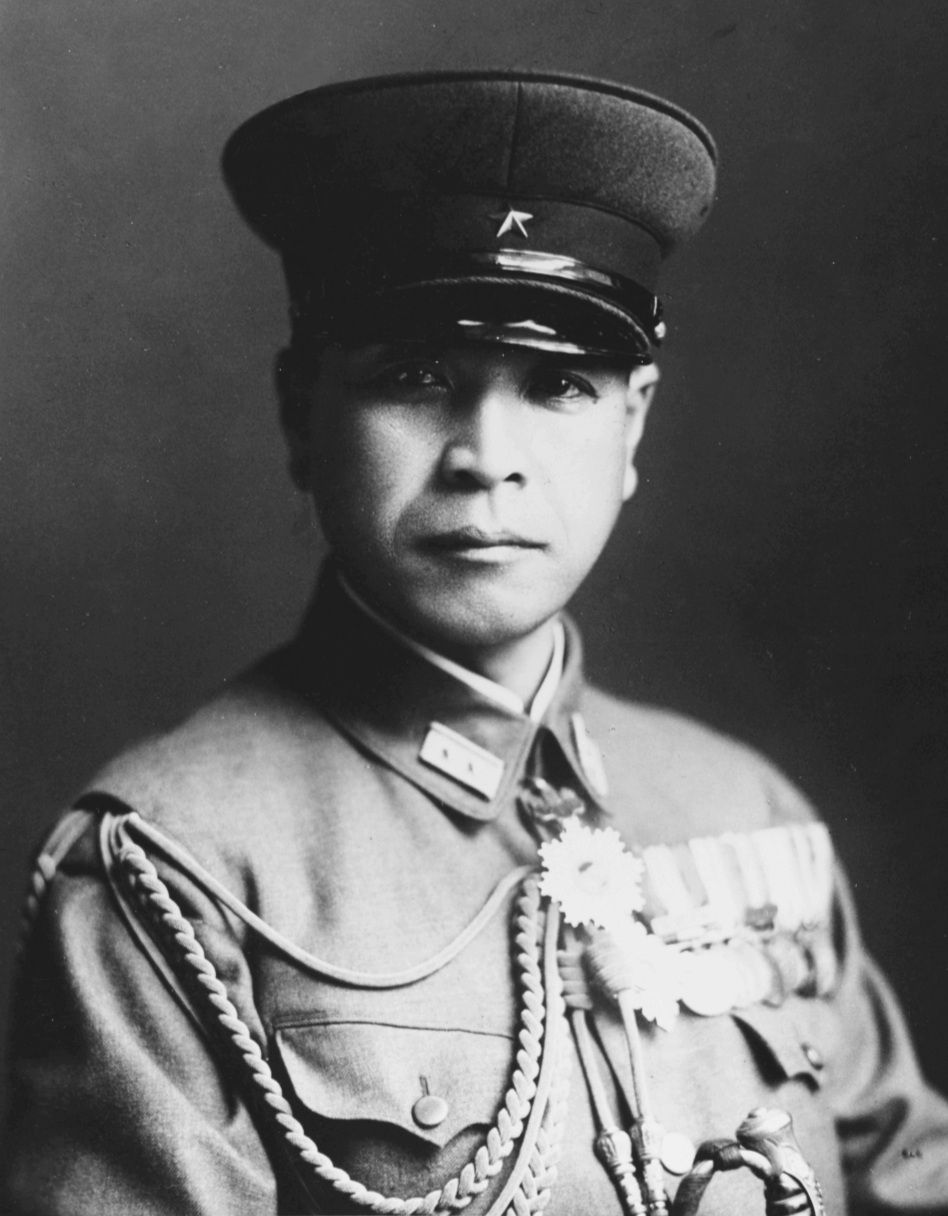
- Born: September 27, 1891; Aichi Prefecture, Japan
- Died: April 19, 1945 (aged 53); Santander, Cebu, Philippines
- Military career
- Allegiance: Empire of Japan
- Branch: Imperial Japanese Army
- Service years: 1912–1945
- Rank: General (posthumous)
- Commands: Thirty-Fifth Army
- Conflicts: Second Sino-Japanese War; World War II

Sōsaku Suzuki (鈴木 宗作, Suzuki Sōsaku; 27 September 1891 – 19 April 1945) was a general in the Imperial Japanese Army during World War II.

== Biography ==
=== Early career ===
Born in Aichi prefecture, Suzuki graduated from the 24th class of the Imperial Japanese Army Academy in 1912. After leaving 31st class of the Army War College in 1921, he served as a resident officer in Germany from 1922 to 1925. Winning promotion to captain in 1927, he was assigned to the Army Ministry's Military Affairs Section the following year.

Transferred to the Kwantung Army in 1933, Suzuki served in Manchukuo for three years as Chief of the Kempeitai and, shortly following his promotion to major in 1935, he became commander of the IJA 4th Infantry Regiment until 1937.

Promoted to major general in July 1938, Suzuki was named Vice Chief of Staff of the Central China Expeditionary Army where he served until September 1939, when he became Vice Chief-of-staff of the China Expeditionary Army. He returned to an administrative assignment at the Imperial Japanese Army General Staff in December 1939 and became head of the Third Bureau in March 1940.

=== World War II ===
Suzuki was promoted to lieutenant general in March 1941 and was assigned as Chief-of-Staff of the IJA 25th Army under General Tomoyuki Yamashita in November, just before the start of the Pacific War. The IJA 25th Army was active in the Malaya campaign from 8 December 1941 to 5 February 1942 in the early stages of the Pacific War. He was later implicated in the planning of the Sook Ching massacre in Singapore, as the IJA 25th Army was the occupying army in Singapore at that time. Suzuki returned to Japan in October 1942 as commandant of the Army Arsenal, and in April 1943 was placed in change of the Army's Transportation and Logistics Bureau.

In July 1944, Suzuki was appointed commander of the IJA 35th Army. This army was raised in the Japanese-occupied Philippines in anticipation of Allied attempts to invade and retake Mindanao and the Visayan islands in central and southern Philippines. It was under the overall command of the Japanese Fourteenth Area Army and headquartered in Cebu. Initially intended as a garrison force to withstand a long-term war of attrition, as the war situation on the Pacific front grew increasingly desperate for Japan, Imperial General Headquarters ordered the bulk of the IJA 35th Army to Leyte as reinforcement to Japanese forces in the Battle of Leyte. At the time of the American landings at Leyte from 20 October 1944 Suzuki had 45,000 soldiers; however, the Allies decimated the Japanese forces by the end of December. As the battle was lost, surviving units were given independent command authority, and were ordered to go to ground and wage a guerrilla campaign on their respective islands for as long as possible. On 24 March 1945 Suzuki escaped to Cebu City, and when the American forces landed on Cebu on 26 March 1945, he retreated into the hills, and from there attempted to withdraw to Mindanao. On 8 April, he received a telegram that his aide, Major Rijome Kawahara, was killed and that Cebu City had fallen. Nevertheless, he continued his trip to escape, however, as he attempted to do so, his boats were attacked by aircraft and Suzuki was killed in action on 19 April 1945 in Bohol Sea, Philippines. He was posthumously promoted to full general.
