= USS LST-935 =

1944 LST-542-class tank landing ship

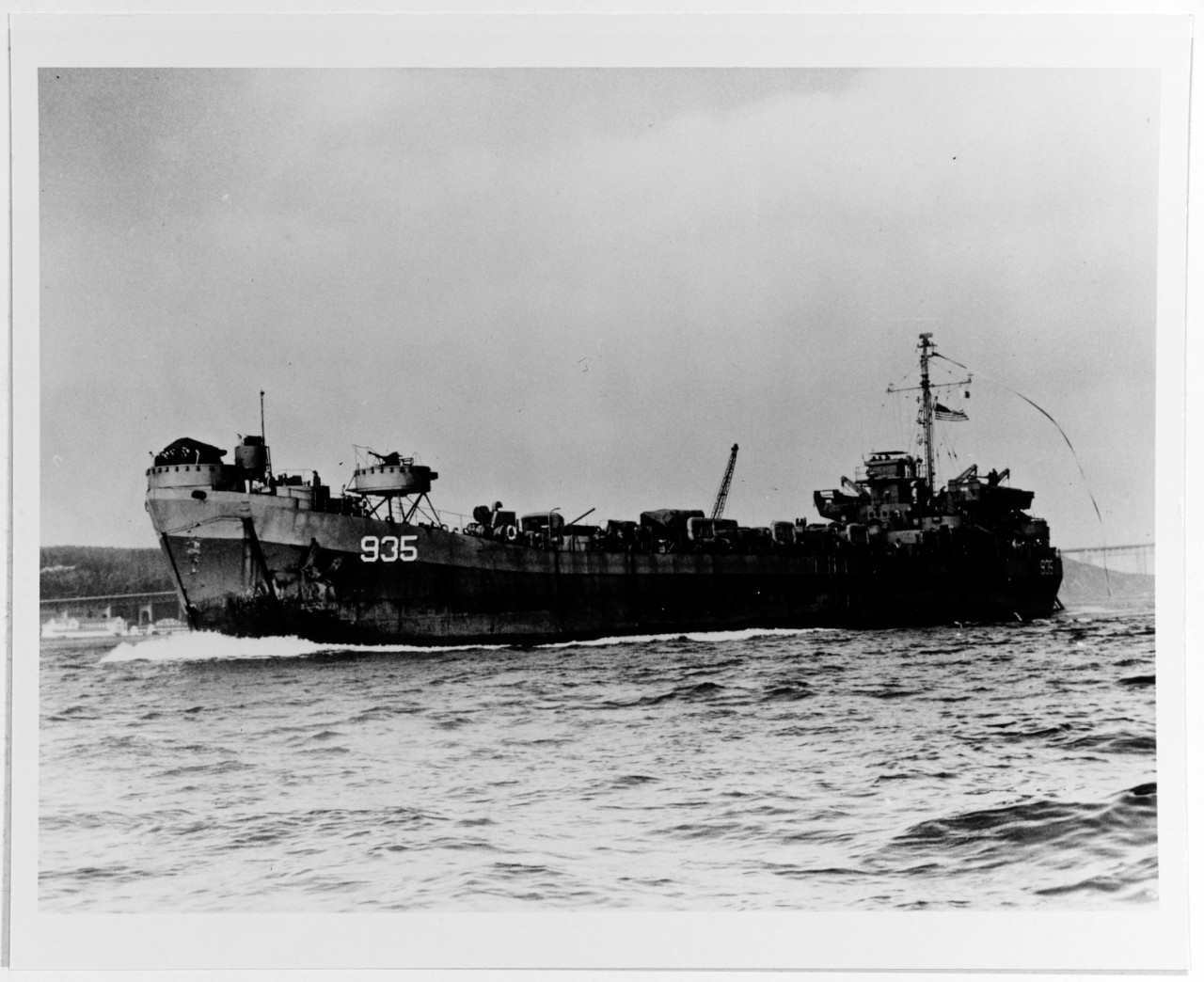
- USS LST-935 in San Francisco Bay, c. early 1946.

History

United States
- Name: LST-935
- Builder: Bethlehem-Hingham Shipyard, Hingham, Massachusetts
- Yard number: 3405
- Laid down: 3 July 1944
- Launched: 5 August 1944
- Commissioned: 29 August 1944
- Decommissioned: 2 July 1946
- Stricken: 15 August 1946
- Identification: Hull symbol: LST-935; Code letters: NVRX
- Honors and awards: 2 × battle star
- Fate: Sold for scrapping, 29 August 1947

General characteristics
- Class & type: LST-542-class tank landing ship
- Displacement: 1,625 long tons (1,651 t) (light); 4,080 long tons (4,145 t) (full (seagoing draft with 1,675 short tons (1,520 t) load); 2,366 long tons (2,404 t) (beaching)
- Length: 328 ft (100 m) oa
- Beam: 50 ft (15 m)
- Draft: Unloaded: 2 ft 4 in (0.71 m) forward; 7 ft 6 in (2.29 m) aft; Full load: 8 ft 3 in (2.51 m) forward; 14 ft 1 in (4.29 m) aft; Landing with 500 short tons (450 t) load: 3 ft 11 in (1.19 m) forward; 9 ft 10 in (3.00 m) aft; Limiting 11 ft 2 in (3.40 m); Maximum navigation 14 ft 1 in (4.29 m)
- Installed power: 2 × 900 hp (670 kW) Electro-Motive Diesel 12-567A diesel engines; 1,800 shp (1,300 kW)
- Propulsion: 1 × Falk main reduction gears; 2 × Propellers
- Speed: 11.6 kn (21.5 km/h; 13.3 mph)
- Range: 24,000 nmi (44,000 km; 28,000 mi) at 9 kn (17 km/h; 10 mph) while displacing 3,960 long tons (4,024 t)
- Boats & landing craft carried: 2 x LCVPs
- Capacity: 1,600–1,900 short tons (3,200,000–3,800,000 lb; 1,500,000–1,700,000 kg) cargo depending on mission
- Troops: 16 officers, 147 enlisted men
- Complement: 13 officers, 104 enlisted men
- Armament: Varied, ultimate armament; 2 × twin 40 mm (1.57 in) Bofors guns; 4 × single 40 mm Bofors guns; 12 × 20 mm (0.79 in) Oerlikon cannons

Service record
- Operations: Consolidation and capture of Southern Philippines; Palawan Island landings (1–2 March 1945); Visayan Island landings (18 March, 28 March–1 April 1945); Mindanao Island landings (17–23 April 1945); Balikpapan operation (26 June–9 July 1945)
- Awards: China Service Medal; American Campaign Medal; Asiatic–Pacific Campaign Medal; World War II Victory Medal; Navy Occupation Service Medal w/Asia Clasp; Philippine Republic Presidential Unit Citation; Philippine Liberation Medal

USS LST-935 was an LST-542-class tank landing ship in the United States Navy. Like many of her class, she was not named and is properly referred to by her hull designation.

== Construction ==
LST-935 was laid down on 3 July 1944, at Hingham, Massachusetts, by the Bethlehem-Hingham Shipyard; launched on 5 August 1944; and commissioned on 29 August 1944.

== Service history ==
During World War II, LST-935 was assigned to the Asiatic-Pacific theater and participated in the Palawan Island landings in March 1945, the Mindanao Island landings in March and April 1945, the Visayan Island landings in April 1945, and the Balikpapan operation in June and July 1945.

Following the war, LST-935 performed occupation duty in the Far East and saw service in China until mid-April 1946. She was decommissioned on 2 July 1946, and struck from the Navy list on 15 August, that same year. The ship was sold to Consolidated Builders, Inc., Seattle, Washington, on 29 August 1947, for scrapping.

== Awards ==
LST-935 earned two battle star for World War II service.

== Bibliography ==
Online resources

- "LST-935". Dictionary of American Naval Fighting Ships. Naval History and Heritage Command. 4 August 2015. This article incorporates text from this source, which is in the public domain.
- "Bethlehem-Hingham, Hingham MA". www.ShipbuildingHistory.com. 11 August 2011.
- "USS LST-935". NavSource. 6 November 2015.
