= USS LST-459 =

1942 LST-1-class tank landing ship

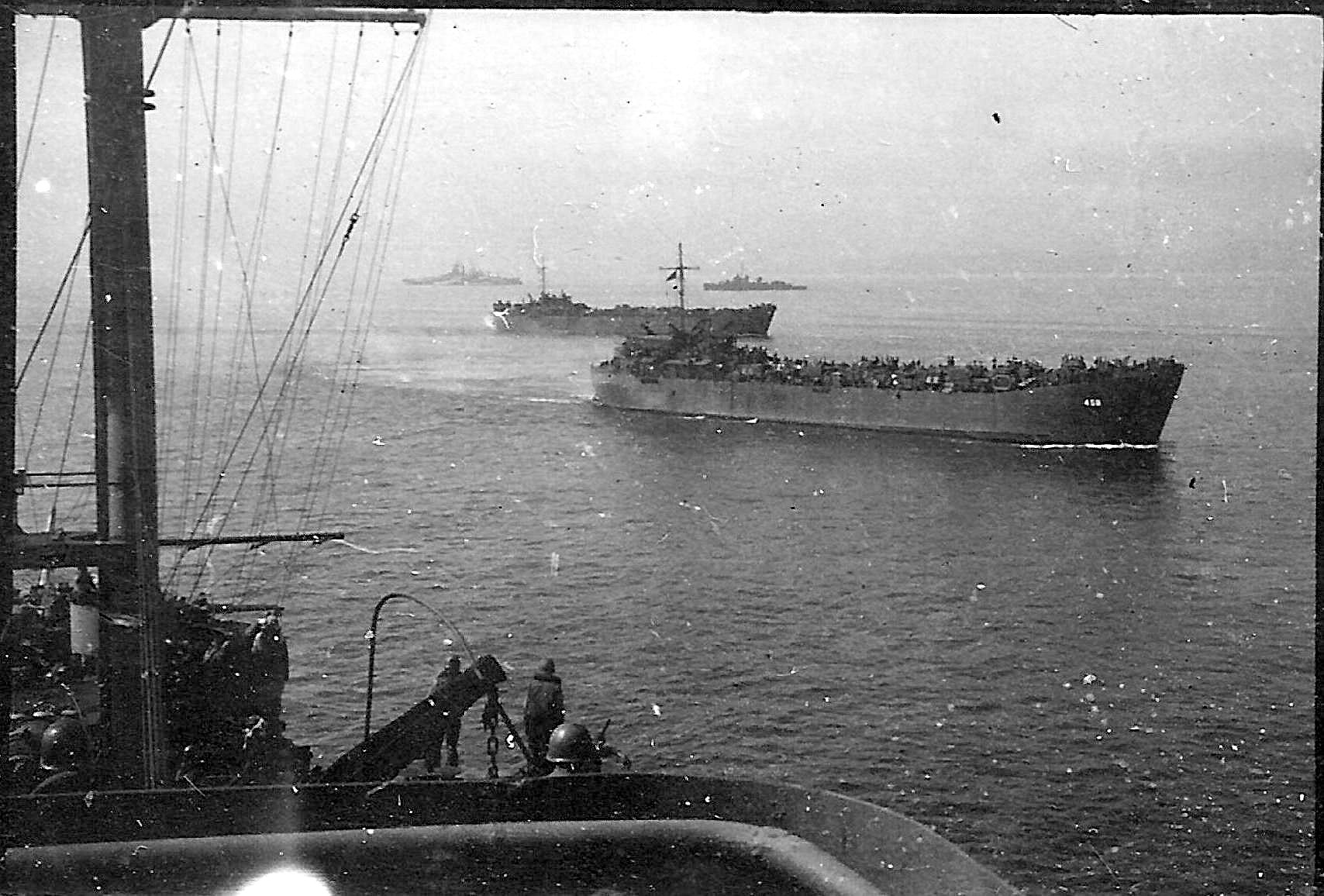
- USS LST-459, passed on port side of Blue Ridge during either the Leyte landings or the Lingayen Gulf landings as she heads for the beach.

History

United States
- Name: LST-459
- Ordered: as a Type S3-M-K2 hull, MCE hull 979
- Builder: Kaiser Shipbuilding Company, Vancouver, Washington
- Yard number: 163
- Laid down: 22 September 1942
- Launched: 29 October 1942
- Commissioned: 13 February 1943
- Decommissioned: 12 April 1946
- Stricken: 19 June 1946
- Identification: Hull symbol: LST-459; Code letters: NFMO
- Honors and awards: 6 × battle stars
- Fate: Sold for scrapping, 31 October 1947

General characteristics
- Class & type: LST-1-class tank landing ship
- Displacement: 4,080 long tons (4,145 t) full load; 2,160 long tons (2,190 t) landing
- Length: 328 ft (100 m) oa
- Beam: 50 ft (15 m)
- Draft: Full load: 8 ft 2 in (2.49 m) forward; 14 ft 1 in (4.29 m) aft; Landing at 2,160 t: 3 ft 11 in (1.19 m) forward; 9 ft 10 in (3.00 m) aft
- Installed power: 2 × 900 hp (670 kW) Electro-Motive Diesel 12-567A diesel engines; 1,700 shp (1,300 kW)
- Propulsion: 1 × Falk main reduction gears; 2 × Propellers
- Speed: 12 kn (22 km/h; 14 mph)
- Range: 24,000 nmi (44,000 km; 28,000 mi) at 9 kn (17 km/h; 10 mph) while displacing 3,960 long tons (4,024 t)
- Boats & landing craft carried: 2 or 6 x LCVPs
- Capacity: 2,100 tons oceangoing maximum; 350 tons main deckload
- Troops: 16 officers, 147 enlisted men
- Complement: 13 officers, 104 enlisted men
- Armament: Varied, ultimate armament; 2 × twin 40 mm (1.57 in) Bofors guns; 4 × single 40 mm Bofors guns; 12 × 20 mm (0.79 in) Oerlikon cannons

Service record
- Operations: Bismarck Archipelago operation; Cape Gloucester, New Britain (22–28 December 1943, 30 December 1943–3 January 1944, 9–11 January and 18–21, 23–26 February 1944); Admiralty Islands landings (11–15 March 1944); Hollandia operation (21–25 April 1944, 1–7 and 9–16 May 1944); Western New Guinea operation; Biak Islands operation (27–29 May, 31 May–4 June, 9–13 and 16–20 June 1944); Noemfoor Island operation (2–4 and 6–11 July 1944); Cape Sansapor operation (12–18 and 20–26 August 1944); Morotai landing (15 September 1944); Leyte landings (5–18 November 1944); Lingayen Gulf landings (4–16 January 1945); Mindanao Island landings (10–18 and 24–31 March 1945); Sulu Archipelago landings (9–1 April 1945)
- Awards: American Campaign Medal; Asiatic–Pacific Campaign Medal; World War II Victory Medal; Navy Occupation Service Medal w/Asia Clasp; Philippine Republic Presidential Unit Citation; Philippine Liberation Medal

USS LST-459 was a United States Navy LST-1-class tank landing ship used in the Asiatic-Pacific Theater during World War II. As with many of her class, the ship was never named. Instead, she was referred to by her hull designation.

== Construction ==
The ship was laid down on 22 September 1942, under Maritime Commission (MARCOM) contract, MC hull 979, by Kaiser Shipyards, Vancouver, Washington; launched 29 October 1942; and commissioned on 13 February 1943,.

== Service history ==
During World War II, LST-459 was assigned to the Asiatic-Pacific theater. She took part in the Bismarck Archipelago operation, the Cape Gloucester, New Britain, landings December through February 1944, and the Admiralty Islands landings in March 1944; the Hollandia operation in April 1944; the Western New Guinea operations, the Biak Islands operation in May and June 1944, the Noemfoor Island operation in July 1944, the Cape Sansapor operation in August 1944, and the Morotai landing in September 1944; the Leyte operation in November 1944; the Lingayen Gulf landings in January 1945; and the consolidation and capture of the southern Philippines during the Mindanao landings in March 1945, and the Sulu Archipelago landings in April 1945.

== Post-war service ==
Following the war, LST-459 performed occupation duty in the Far East until mid-November 1945. Upon her return to the United States, she was decommissioned on 12 April 1946, and struck from the Navy list on 19 June, that same year. On 31 October 1947, the ship was sold to the New Orleans Shipwrecking Co., New Orleans, Louisiana, and subsequently scrapped.

== Honors and awards ==
LST-459 earned six battle stars for her World War II service.

== Notes ==
Citations

== Bibliography ==
Online resources

- "LST-459". Dictionary of American Naval Fighting Ships. Naval History and Heritage Command. 3 August 2015. This article incorporates text from this source, which is in the public domain.
- "Kaiser Vancouver, Vancouver WA". www.ShipbuildingHistory.com. 27 November 2010.
- "USS LST-459". NavSource. 10 October 2014.
