= USS LST-1035 =

US Navy landing ship

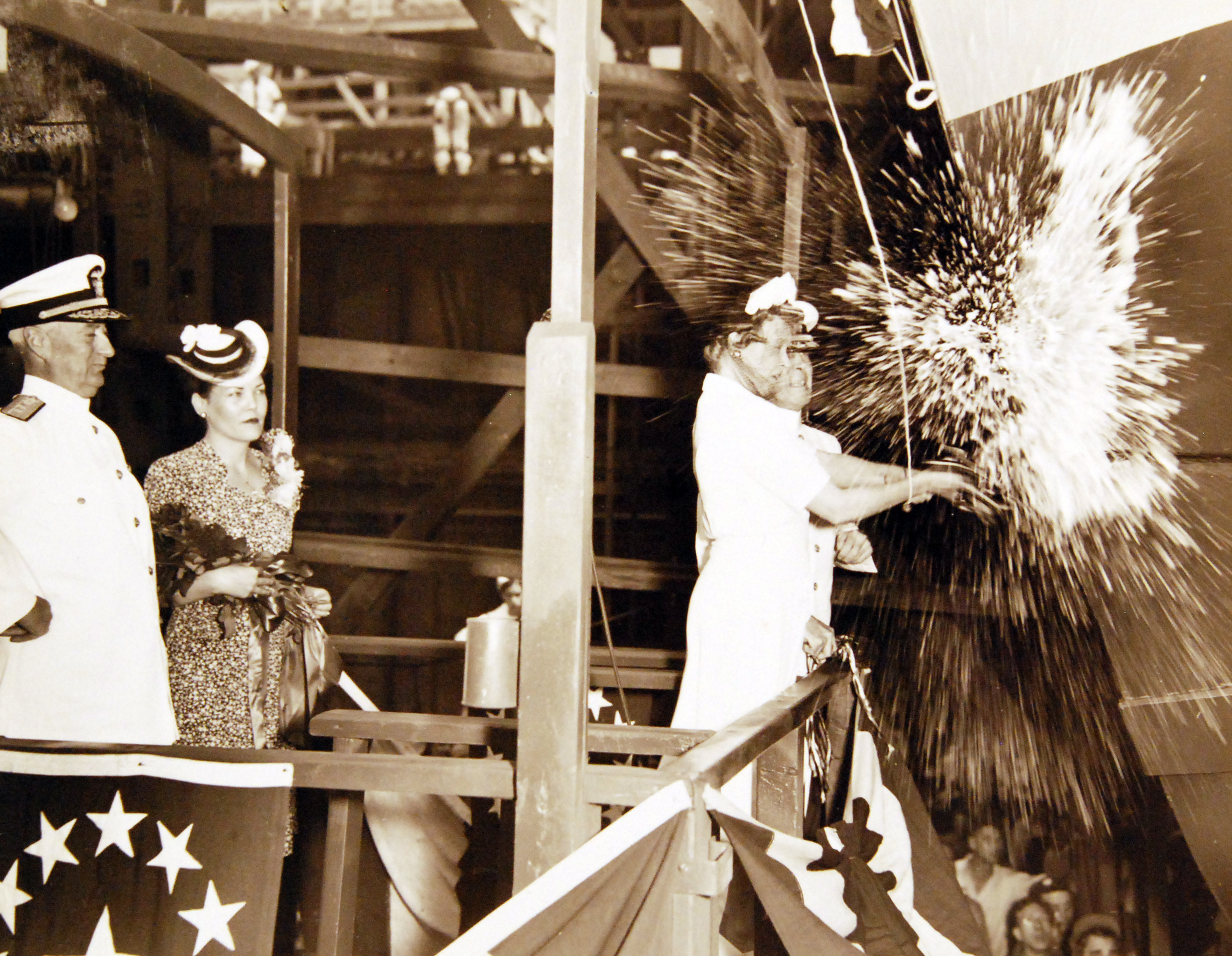
- LST-1035 christening ceremony

History

United States
- Name: LST-1035
- Builder: Boston Navy Yard, Boston
- Laid down: 26 June 1944
- Launched: 4 August 1944
- Commissioned: 1 September 1944
- Decommissioned: 3 June 1946
- Fate: Sold, 16 December 1947

General characteristics
- Class & type: LST-542-class tank landing ship
- Displacement: 1,623 short tons (1,472 t) (light); 3,800 short tons (3,400 t) (full load)
- Length: 327 ft 9 in (99.90 m)
- Beam: 50 ft 1.5 in (15.278 m)
- Installed power: 1,800 hp (1,300 kW)
- Propulsion: 2 × diesel engines; 2 × propellers
- Range: 23,000 nmi (43,000 km; 26,000 mi) at 8.75 knots (16.21 km/h; 10.07 mph)
- Complement: 7 officers, 104 enlisted
- Armament: Intended: 2 × twin 40 mm (1.6 in) guns; 4 × single 40 mm (1.6 in) guns; 12 × single 20 mm (0.79 in) guns

USS LST-1035 was a LST-542-class Landing Ship Tank of the United States Navy. Built in 1944, she operated in the Pacific Theater during World War II and participated in three amphibious assaults in the southern Philippine Islands. Following the war, she joined American occupation forces in East Asia until she was decommissioned in 1946 and sold for scrap in 1947.

== Development and design ==
Before the 1930s, amphibious assaults typically relied on ships' boats to ferry troops and equipment ashore, often with little enemy resistance. However, the introduction of mechanized armies required specialized vessels that could cross oceans to deliver large, heavy, vehicles–such as tanks–directly onto a beachhead. The British developed the first Landing Ship Tanks (LSTs) in 1941. These vessels featured a shallow draft and a bow-mounted ramp that allowed vehicles to drive directly onto land. An anchor at the stern enabled the ship to pull herself free after intentionally beaching on shore. By early 1942, the United States began constructing LSTs based on the same principles. In late 1943, the LST-542 class was a refined version of the second generation LST(2) design, which incorporated war-time experience including a weather deck capable of carrying heavy cargo, more anti-air defenses, and a greater displacement.

The LST-542 class featured a length of 327 feet 9 inches (99.90 m) and beam of 50 feet 1.5 inches (15.278 m). While at sea, the fully loaded draft ranged from 7 feet 1 inch (2.16 m) in the bow and 13 feet 6 inches (4.11 m) in the aft to 3 feet 1 inch (0.94 m) and 9 feet 6 inches (2.90 m) when beached. The vessels featured a light displacement of 1,623 short tons (1,472 t), loaded displacement of 3,800 short tons (3,400 t), and a deadweight (cargo) capacity of 1,900 short tons (1,700 t), which was capable of carrying up to 20 M4 Sherman tanks or 70 trucks across the tank and weather decks. They were propelled by two V12 900 horsepower (670 kW) General Motors 12-567 diesel engines that provided an economic cruising speed of 8.75 knots (16.21 km/h; 10.07 mph) for a range of 23,000 nautical miles (43,000 km; 26,000 mi) through two propellers. Armament on LSTs varied widely between ships due to differences in shipyards, wartime modifications, supply shortages, and weapons provided by embarked troops. The ideal anti-air suite consisted of two twin 40-millimeter (1.6 in), four single 40 mm (1.6 in), and twelve single 20 mm (0.79 in) guns. Crew requirements also differed, with LSTs that retained davits to carry two Higgins boats were operated by seven officers and 104 enlisted sailors.

== Service history ==
LST-1035 was laid down on 26 June 1944 at the Boston Navy Yard, launched on 4 August 1944, and commissioned on 1 September 1944. Once in service, she was assigned to the Pacific Theater and participated in the amphibious assaults on Palawan in March 1945, Visayan Islands between March and April, and Tarakan between April and May 1945. When the war ended, LST-1035 performed occupation duty in the region until February 1946. She returned to the United States and was decommissioned on 3 June 1946. On 3 July, she was struck from the Navy List and was sold off to a company for scrap on 16 December 1947.
