= USS LST-933 =

1944 LST-542-class tank landing ship

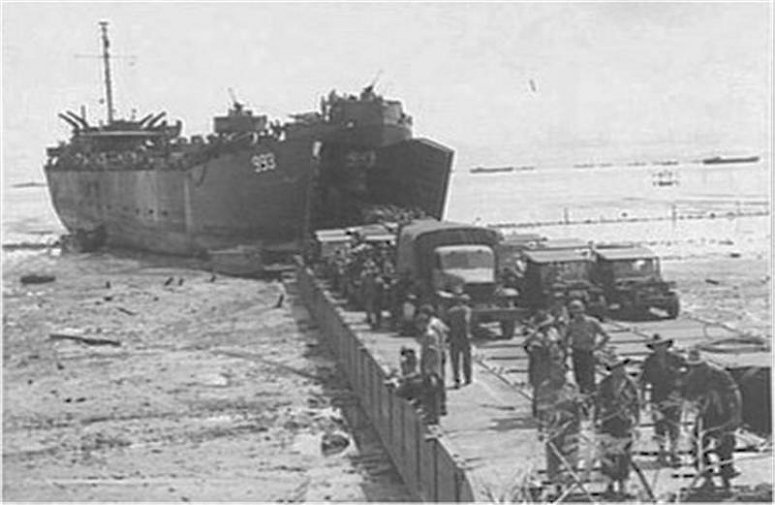
- USS LST-933 beached high and dry on the mud flats at Tarakan, Borneo while landing troops and equipment of the Australian Army's Headquarters 26th Infantry Brigade across a pontoon causeway, 1 May 1945.

History

United States
- Name: LST-933
- Builder: Bethlehem-Hingham Shipyard, Hingham, Massachusetts
- Yard number: 3403
- Laid down: 23 June 1944
- Launched: 26 July 1944
- Commissioned: 20 August 1944
- Decommissioned: 2 July 1946
- Stricken: 15 August 1946
- Identification: Hull symbol: LST-933; Code letters: NKBY
- Honors and awards: 2 × battle star
- Fate: Sold for scrapping, 25 May 1948

General characteristics
- Class & type: LST-542-class tank landing ship
- Displacement: 1,625 long tons (1,651 t) (light); 4,080 long tons (4,145 t) (full (seagoing draft with 1,675 short tons (1,520 t) load); 2,366 long tons (2,404 t) (beaching)
- Length: 328 ft (100 m) oa
- Beam: 50 ft (15 m)
- Draft: Unloaded: 2 ft 4 in (0.71 m) forward; 7 ft 6 in (2.29 m) aft; Full load: 8 ft 3 in (2.51 m) forward; 14 ft 1 in (4.29 m) aft; Landing with 500 short tons (450 t) load: 3 ft 11 in (1.19 m) forward; 9 ft 10 in (3.00 m) aft; Limiting 11 ft 2 in (3.40 m); Maximum navigation 14 ft 1 in (4.29 m)
- Installed power: 2 × 900 hp (670 kW) Electro-Motive Diesel 12-567A diesel engines; 1,800 shp (1,300 kW)
- Propulsion: 1 × Falk main reduction gears; 2 × Propellers
- Speed: 11.6 kn (21.5 km/h; 13.3 mph)
- Range: 24,000 nmi (44,000 km; 28,000 mi) at 9 kn (17 km/h; 10 mph) while displacing 3,960 long tons (4,024 t)
- Boats & landing craft carried: 2 x LCVPs
- Capacity: 1,600–1,900 short tons (3,200,000–3,800,000 lb; 1,500,000–1,700,000 kg) cargo depending on mission
- Troops: 16 officers, 147 enlisted men
- Complement: 13 officers, 104 enlisted men
- Armament: Varied, ultimate armament; 2 × twin 40 mm (1.57 in) Bofors guns; 4 × single 40 mm Bofors guns; 12 × 20 mm (0.79 in) Oerlikon cannons

Service record
- Operations: Palawan Island landings (28 February–1 March, 6–7 March 1945); Mindanao Island landings (17–23 April, 10–16 May 1945); Assault and occupation of Okinawa Gunto (21–30 June 1945)
- Awards: American Campaign Medal; Asiatic–Pacific Campaign Medal; World War II Victory Medal; Navy Occupation Service Medal w/Asia Clasp; Philippine Republic Presidential Unit Citation; Philippine Liberation Medal

USS LST-933 was an LST-542-class tank landing ship in the United States Navy. Like many of her class, she was not named and is properly referred to by her hull designation.

== Construction ==
LST-933 was laid down on 23 June 1944, at Hingham, Massachusetts, by the Bethlehem-Hingham Shipyard; launched on 26 July 1944; and commissioned on 20 August 1944.

== Service history ==
During World War II, LST-933 was assigned to the Asiatic-Pacific theater and participated in the Palawan Island landings in February and March 1945, the Mindanao Island landings in April and May 1945, and the assault and occupation of Okinawa Gunto in June 1945.

Following the war, LST-933 performed occupation duty in the Far East until mid-February 1946. She returned to the United States and was decommissioned on 2 July 1946, and struck from the Navy list on 15 August, that same year. On 25 May 1948, the ship was sold to Hughes Bros., Inc., New York, New York, for scrapping.

== Awards ==
LST-933 earned two battle star for World War II service.

== Bibliography ==
Online resources

- "LST-933". Dictionary of American Naval Fighting Ships. Naval History and Heritage Command. 4 August 2015. This article incorporates text from this source, which is in the public domain.
- "Bethlehem-Hingham, Hingham MA". www.ShipbuildingHistory.com. 11 August 2011.
- "USS LST-933". NavSource. 6 November 2015.
