= USS LST-941 =

1944 LST-542-class tank landing ship

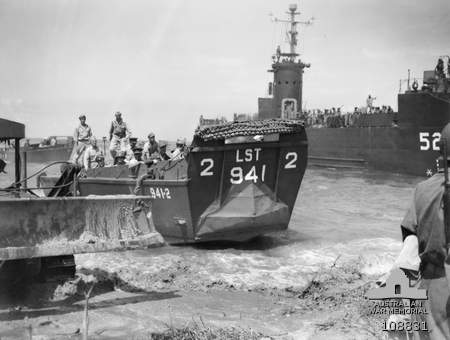
- Brunei Bay Area, Labuan, 10 June 1945, General Douglas MacArthur, Supreme Commander, Allied Land Forces, South West Pacific Area and Lieutenant General Sir Leslie Morshead, General Officer Commanding I Corps arriving on Labuan Island, soon after the Australian Landing in the area during the Operation Oboe 6. The landing party is disembarking from USS LST-941's LCVP #2. In the background is LSM-52.

History

United States
- Name: LST-941
- Builder: Bethlehem-Hingham Shipyard, Hingham, Massachusetts
- Yard number: 3411
- Laid down: 28 July 1944
- Launched: 30 August 1944
- Commissioned: 22 September 1944
- Decommissioned: 1 May 1946
- Stricken: 3 July 1946
- Identification: Hull symbol: LST-941; Code letters: NVTT
- Honors and awards: 2 × battle star
- Fate: Sold for commercial service, 28 March 1947
- Status: Fate unknown

General characteristics
- Class & type: LST-542-class tank landing ship
- Displacement: 1,625 long tons (1,651 t) (light); 4,080 long tons (4,145 t) (full (seagoing draft with 1,675 short tons (1,520 t) load); 2,366 long tons (2,404 t) (beaching)
- Length: 328 ft (100 m) oa
- Beam: 50 ft (15 m)
- Draft: Unloaded: 2 ft 4 in (0.71 m) forward; 7 ft 6 in (2.29 m) aft; Full load: 8 ft 3 in (2.51 m) forward; 14 ft 1 in (4.29 m) aft; Landing with 500 short tons (450 t) load: 3 ft 11 in (1.19 m) forward; 9 ft 10 in (3.00 m) aft; Limiting 11 ft 2 in (3.40 m); Maximum navigation 14 ft 1 in (4.29 m)
- Installed power: 2 × 900 hp (670 kW) Electro-Motive Diesel 12-567A diesel engines; 1,800 shp (1,300 kW)
- Propulsion: 1 × Falk main reduction gears; 2 × Propellers
- Speed: 11.6 kn (21.5 km/h; 13.3 mph)
- Range: 24,000 nmi (44,000 km; 28,000 mi) at 9 kn (17 km/h; 10 mph) while displacing 3,960 long tons (4,024 t)
- Boats & landing craft carried: 2 x LCVPs
- Capacity: 1,600–1,900 short tons (3,200,000–3,800,000 lb; 1,500,000–1,700,000 kg) cargo depending on mission
- Troops: 16 officers, 147 enlisted men
- Complement: 13 officers, 104 enlisted men
- Armament: Varied, ultimate armament; 2 × twin 40 mm (1.57 in) Bofors guns; 4 × single 40 mm Bofors guns; 12 × 20 mm (0.79 in) Oerlikon cannons

Service record
- Operations: Consolidation and capture of Southern Philippines; Palawan Island landings (1–3 March 1945); Visayan Island landings (26–28 March, 2–4 April 1945); Borneo operations; Labuan Island landing, Brunei Bay (10 June 1945)
- Awards: American Campaign Medal; Asiatic–Pacific Campaign Medal; World War II Victory Medal; Navy Occupation Service Medal w/Asia Clasp; Philippine Republic Presidential Unit Citation; Philippine Liberation Medal

USS LST-941 was an LST-542-class tank landing ship in the United States Navy. Like many of her class, she was not named and is properly referred to by her hull designation.

== Construction ==
LST-941 was laid down on 28 July 1944, at Hingham, Massachusetts, by the Bethlehem-Hingham Shipyard; launched on 30 August 1944; sponsored by Mrs. Roland Gariepy; and commissioned on 22 September 1944.

== Service history ==
During World War II LST-941 was assigned to the Asiatic-Pacific theater and participated in the Palawan Island landings in March 1945, the Visayan Island landings in March and April 1945, and the Labuan Island landing, Brunei Bay, in June 1945.

Following the war, she performed occupation duty in the Far East until 25 October 1945. In December 1945, Lieutenant Paul W. Phillips, USNR, took command of the ship. LST-941 returned to the United States and was decommissioned on 1 May 1946, and struck from the Navy list on 3 July, that same year. On 28 March 1947, she was sold to Francis R. Stolz for operation.

== Awards ==
LST-941 earned two battle stars for World War II service.

== Bibliography ==
Online resources

- "LST-941". Dictionary of American Naval Fighting Ships. Naval History and Heritage Command. This article incorporates text from this source, which is in the public domain.
- "Bethlehem-Hingham, Hingham MA". www.ShipbuildingHistory.com. 11 August 2011.
- "USS LST-941". NavSource. 6 November 2015.
