= Puerto Princesa =

Highly-urbanized city in Mimaropa, Philippines

- Highly urbanized city
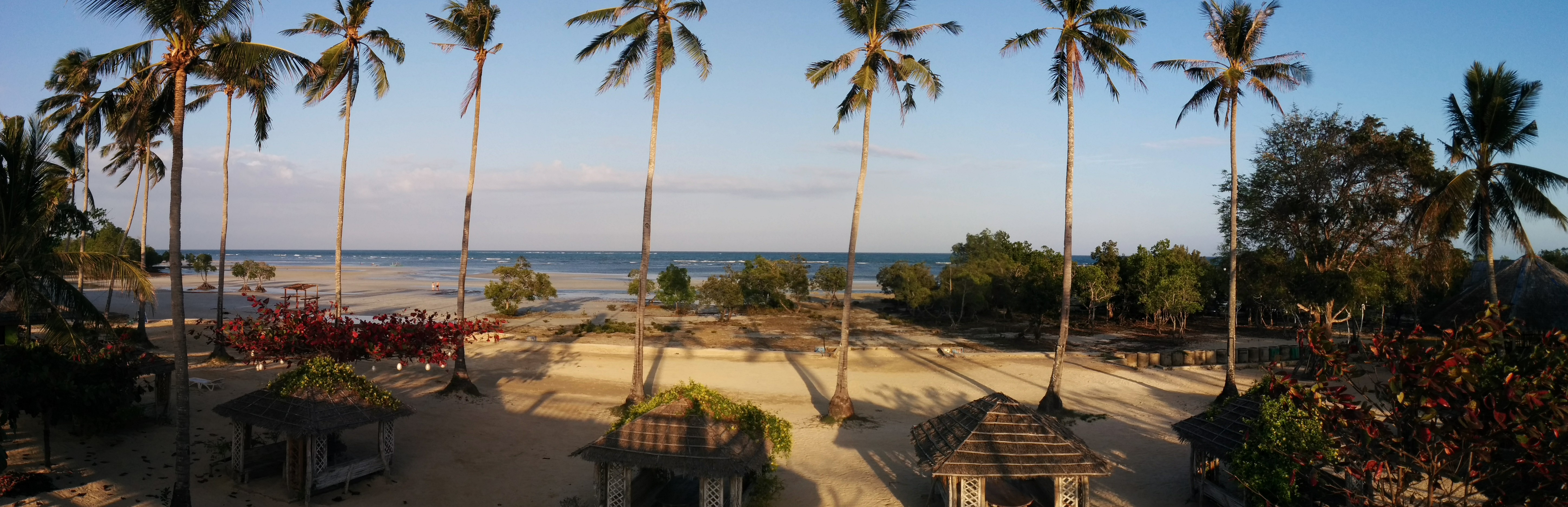
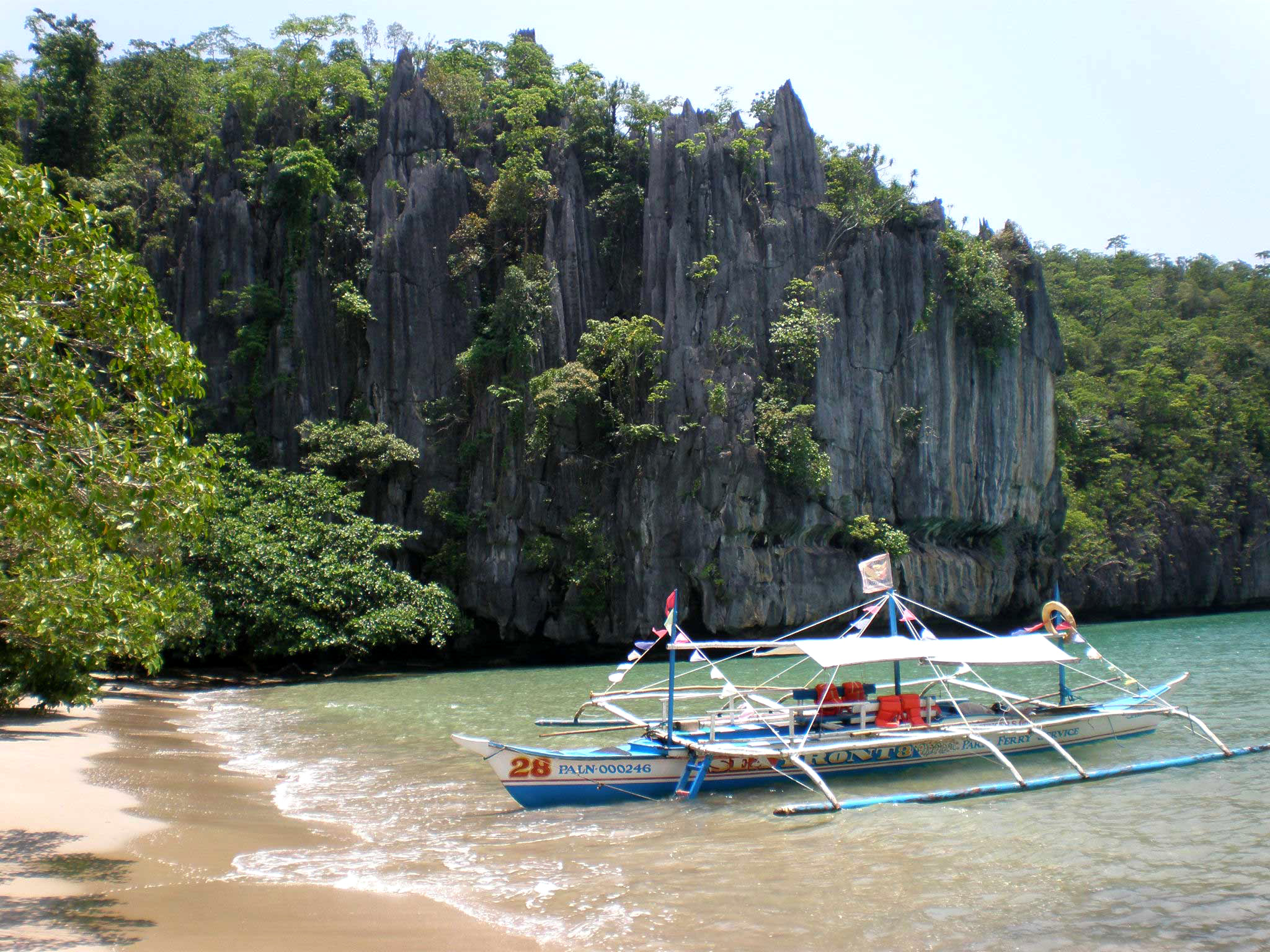
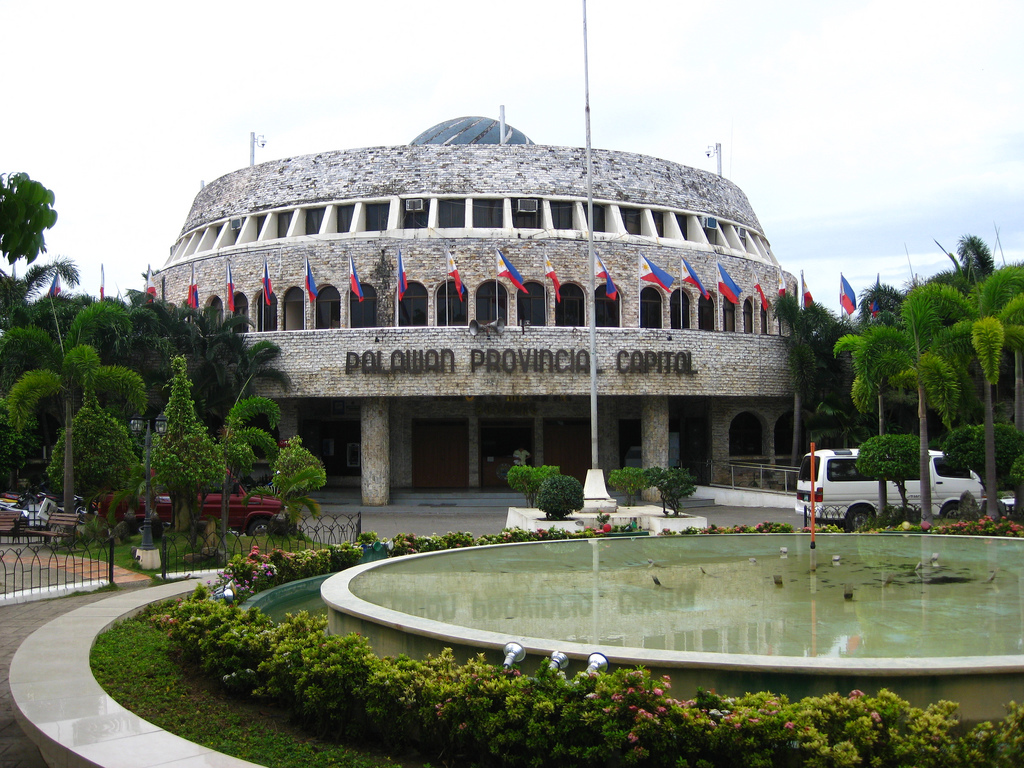
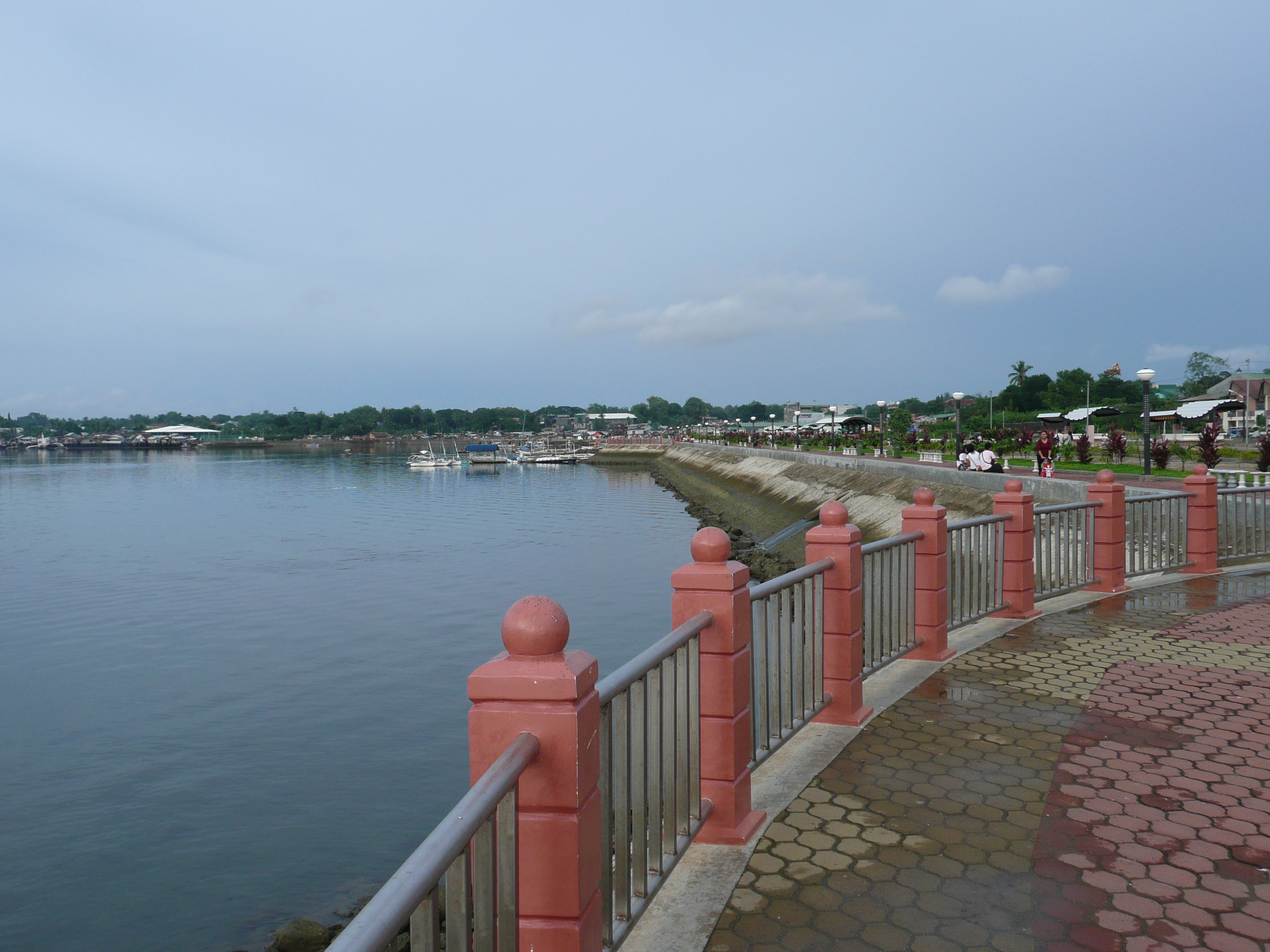
- From top, left to right: Emerald Beach and Nature Park, Dos Palmas Resort, Puerto Princesa Subterranean River National Park, Palawan Provincial Capitol, Puerto Princesa Baywalk

- Flag Seal
- Nicknames: Eco-Tourism Center of the Philippines; The City in the Forest; City of the Living God
- Anthem: Martsa ng Puerto Princesa (Puerto Princesa March)
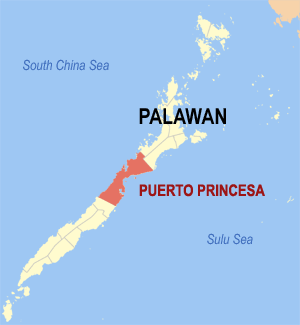
- Map of Mimaropa with Puerto Princesa highlighted
- Interactive map of Puerto Princesa
- Location within the Philippines
- Coordinates: 9°44′24″N 118°44′38″E
- Country: Philippines
- Region: Mimaropa
- Province: Palawan (geographically only)
- District: 3rd district
- Founded: March 4, 1872
- Cityhood: January 1, 1970
- Highly urbanized city: July 21, 2007
- Named for: Infanta Eulalia of Spain (as Puerto de la Princesa)
- Barangays: 66 (see Barangays)

Government
  - Type: Sangguniang Panlungsod
  - Mayor: Lucilo R. Bayron
  - Vice Mayor: Peter Q. Maristela
  - Representative: Gil A. Acosta Jr.
  - City Council: Members: Gerry C. Abad; Elgin Robert L. Damasco; Herbert S. Dilig; Eleuterius L. Edualino; Patrick Alex M. Hagedorn; Epitacio D. Lao Jr.; Luis M. Marcaida III; Matthew K. Mendoza; Victor S. Oliveros; Modesto V. Rodriguez II
  - Electorate: 181,815 voters (2025)

Area
  - Total: 2,381.02 km^{2} (919.32 sq mi)
- Elevation: 98 m (322 ft)
- Highest elevation: 1,257 m (4,124 ft)
- Lowest elevation: 0 m (0 ft)

Population (2024 census)
  - Total: 316,384
  - Density: 132.878/km^{2} (344.151/sq mi)
  - Households: 82,134

Economy
  - Income class: 1st city income class
  - Poverty incidence: 6.5% (2023)
  - Revenue: ₱ 5,296 million (2024)
  - Assets: ₱ 19,564 million (2024)
  - Expenditure: ₱ 4,057 million (2024)

Service provider
  - Electricity: Palawan Electric Cooperative (PALECO)
- Time zone: UTC+8 (PST)
- ZIP code: 5300, 5301 (Iwahig Penal Colony)
- PSGC: 1731500000
- IDD : area code: +63 (0)48
- Native languages: Ibatag; Palawano; Tagalog
- Website: puertoprincesa.ph

Puerto Princesa, (Note: American English: /ˌpwɛrtoʊ prɪnˈseɪsə/ or /ˌpwɛrtoʊ prɪnˈsɛsə/; Philippine English: /ˌpwɛrto prɪnˈsɛsa/; Tagalog pronunciation: [ˌpwɛɾ.to pɾɪnˈsɛ.sɐ]; American Spanish: Spanish pronunciation: [ˈpweɾto pɾinˈsesa], European Spanish: Spanish pronunciation: [ˈpweɾto pɾinˈθesa]) officially the City of Puerto Princesa (Cuyonon: Siyudad i'ang Puerto Princesa; Filipino: Lungsod ng Puerto Princesa), is a highly urbanized city in the Mimaropa region of the Philippines. According to the 2024 census, it has a population of 316,384 people.

It is a city located in the western Philippine province of Palawan and is the westernmost city in the Philippines. Though the seat of government and capital of the province, the city itself is one of 38 independent cities within the Philippines not controlled by the province in which it is geographically located and is therefore an independent area located within Palawan for its geographical and statistical purposes by the Philippine Statistics Authority. It is the largest city in the province of Palawan and the Mimaropa region.

It is the least densely populated city in the Philippines with 110 inhabitants per square kilometer (280 inhabitants/mi^{2}). In terms of land area, the city is the second largest geographically after Davao City with an area of 2,381.02 square kilometers (919.32 sq mi). Puerto Princesa is the location of the Philippines' Western Command headquarters.

Today, Puerto Princesa is a tourist city with beach resorts and seafood restaurants.

== Etymology ==
The name Puerto Princesa has several possible origins. It is said to have been attributed by locals to a princess-like maiden who roams the place on certain nights of the year, while other accounts attribute its geographical advantage as a seaport which is a naturally protected area due to its surrounding mountains, and is characterized by a depth able to accommodate any size of shipping vessel.

There are two official versions about the actual origin of the name. The first is that place was originally named Port of the Princess (Spanish: Puerto de la Princesa) after Infanta Eulalia, one of the princesses born to Isabella II of Spain and her consort, Francis, Duke of Cádiz. (Note: The reference also inaccurately states that Eulalia died young; in reality, she would eventually become the wife of the Duke of Galliera, and the longest-lived among the children of Isabella II and Francis, Duke of Cadiz, dying at the age of 94 in 1958.) Another version, however, states that the place was originally named Port Asuncion (Spanish: Puerto de Asunción), allegedly named after another daughter of Isabella II and the Duke of Cadiz. In this version, the princess suffered an untimely death, which prompted the Queen to change the name to Puerto de la Princesa, and was eventually shortened to Puerto Princesa. However, this second version is likely to be incorrect, as Isabella and Francis did not have a daughter named Asunción.

== History ==
=== Spanish era ===
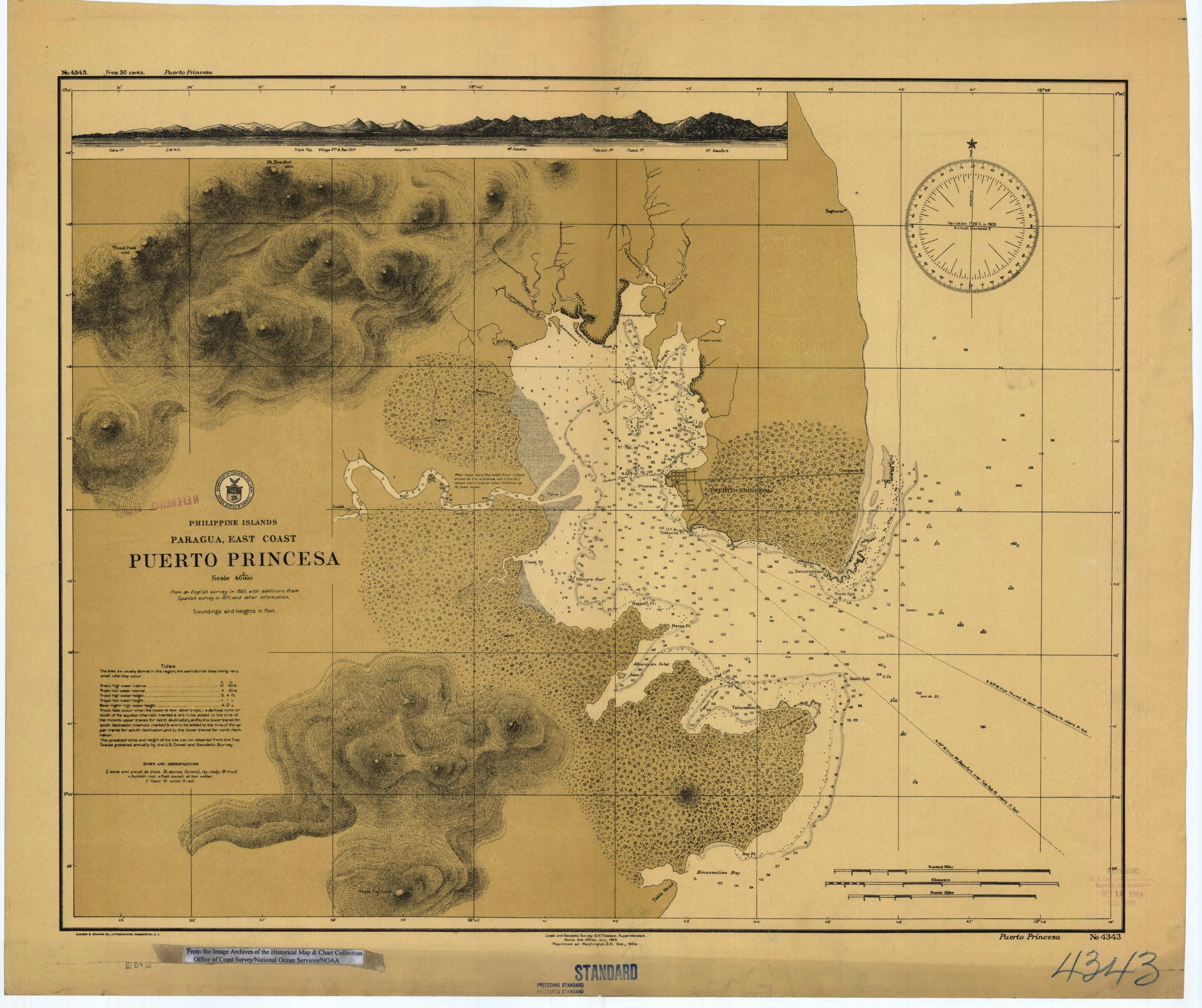
A 1904 map of Puerto Princesa

Spanish colonists founded the settlement on 4 March 1872 as Puerto de la Princesa by Ezequiel Moreno, in the course of their exploration of the province. As they scanned the Palawan shoreline for a capital site, they came upon a hill with steep declivity. Rowing to shore, they surveyed the hill and discovered an extensive plateau which they decided as ideal for settlement. In the same year, the community of Renampacan (now Inagawan) was founded.

Soon after, Fr. Antonio Muro levelled a portion of the hill to make way for a chapel (that section is now occupied by the Roman Catholic Cathedral, the P.C. Barracks and the Rizal Park, the Old Municipal Building used to be there, as well as an Elementary School). The first mass celebrated in Puerto Princesa took place at a site where a marker now stands.

In May 1872, the Port of Puerto Princesa became the center of Spanish naval operations in the area because the Bay met all the navy's requirements. Royal decrees later provided incentives to settlers, and by 1883 the settlement had flourished into a town of twelve roads, a hospital and well-built port.

In 1894, Puerto Princesa was recognized by government authorities as one of the most beautiful towns in the country by virtue of the orderly distribution of streets, buildings and houses as well as the cleanliness of the community.

=== American era ===
In 1911, the New American Administration made Puerto Princesa the seat of the Palawan Provincial Government with Major John Brown as Lieutenant Governor.

In the year 1936, Governor Heginio Mendoza made a directive on the transfer of the Palawan High School (currently Palawan National School) from the island municipality of Cuyo to the central place of the province, which was the Municipality of Puerto Princesa.

=== World War II ===
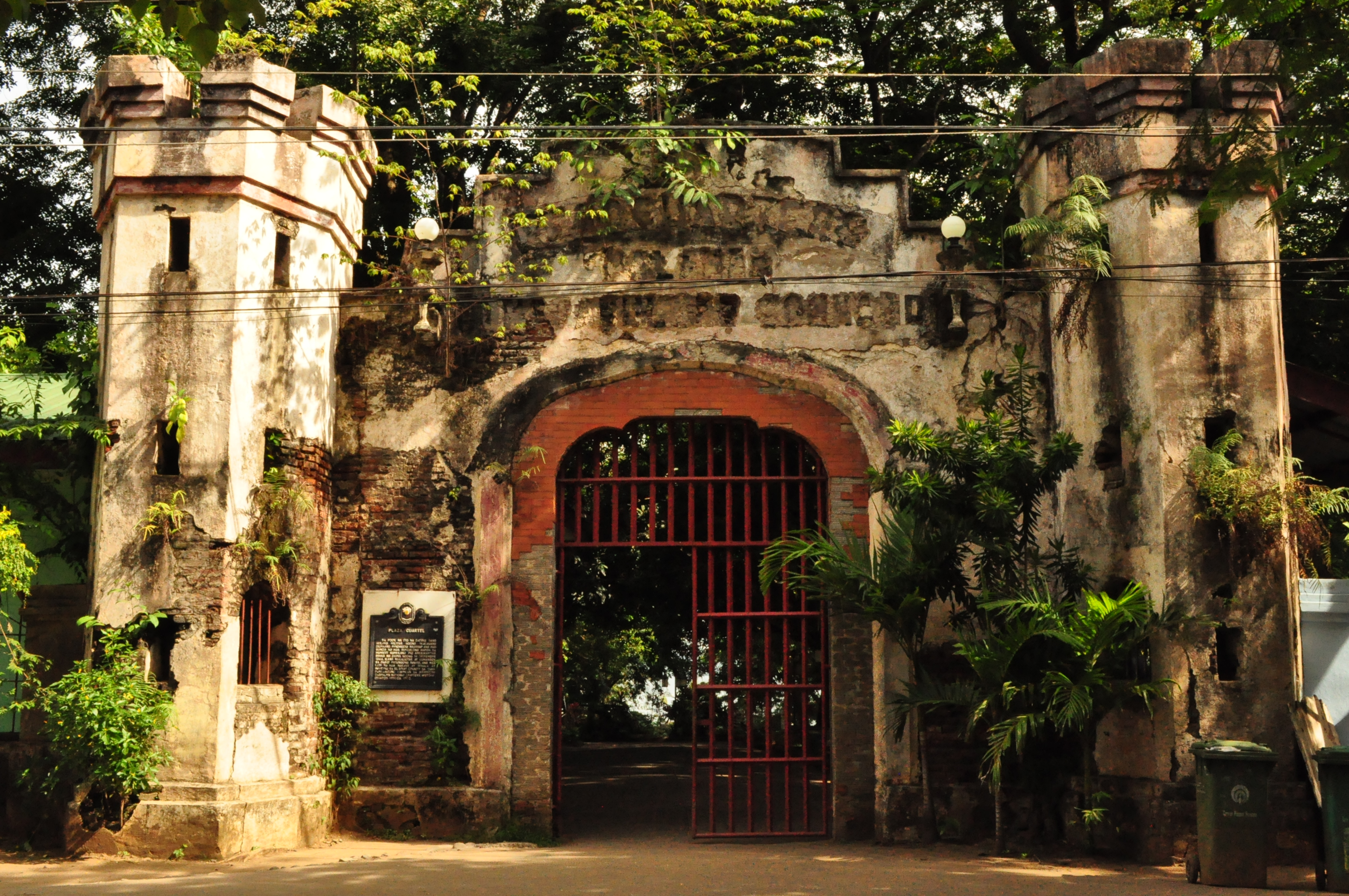
Plaza Cuartel, the site of the infamous Palawan Massacre committed by the Imperial Japanese Army

During the Pacific campaign of World War II and the Japanese occupation, the village was largely abandoned. On 1 January 1942, Japanese planes began bombing Puerto Princesa and shot several bullets. On 18 May of the same year, Japanese troops landed and occupied Puerto Princesa City. After the establishment of the Second Philippine Republic on 14 October 1943, President Jose P. Laurel appointed Major Patricio Fernandez as the Provincial Governor of Palawan, and Severino Vicente as the mayor of Puerto Princesa. For the most part, it was mostly Puerto Princesa and Aborlan that were within the Japanese-occupied zone, while the rest were under heavy guerrilla influence or full guerrilla control. On 7 January 1944, Ex-Governor and guerrilla commander Dr. Higinio Mendoza as well as 15 other patriots were brutally massacred by Japanese forces. In the same year on 20 October, American planes bombed the town, causing widespread destruction. The Filipino Constabulary barracks was the scene of the Palawan Massacre on 14 December, just before liberation with the allied Invasion of Palawan.

On 28 February 1945, US forces landed in Puerto Princesa and on 4 March, the Commonwealth Government was restored in Palawan.

=== Post-World War II ===
In 1951, the barrios of Tinitian, Caramay, Rizal, Del Pilar, Malcampo, Tumarbong, Taradungan, Ilian, and Capayas were separated to form the town of Roxas.

In 1955, the sitios of Materingen, Tandayag, Nasedoc, and Panlawagan were separated from the barrio of Maroyogon and elevated into a barrio.

In 1956, the sitios of Calagbenguen, Tarabanan, Bendoyan, Talabigan, Tagbuan, and Langogan were constituted into the barrio of Concepcion.

In 1957, the barrio of Tapul was renamed to Salvacion.

On 21 June 1969, San Vicente was created from Puerto Princesa and Taytay, with the barrios of Caruray and the current poblacion of the town being separated from Puerto Princesa while the barrios of New Agutaya and Binga were separated from Taytay.

=== Cityhood ===
The town was converted into a city on 1 January 1970, under Republic Act 5906 as amended by P.D. 437, through the effort of then Congressman Ramon Mitra, Jr. Feliberto R. Oliveros, Jr., who then became the first City Mayor. In 1987, the port of Puerto Princesa was put under the administration of the Philippine Ports Authority, expanding the city's importance nationally and advancing its infrastructure.

==== Highly urbanized city ====
On March 26, 2007, through Proclamation No. 1264, the city of Puerto Princesa was converted into a highly urbanized city. A plebiscite was held on 21 July 2007, where majority of residents voted in its favor. In 2011, the President launched a nationwide campaign for the inclusion of Puerto Princesa's underground river into the New Seven Wonders of Nature. This campaign came into fruition when the Puerto Princesa Subterranean River National Park, the city's top heritage site, was recognized internationally as one of the New Seven Wonders of Nature in 2012.

=== Contemporary ===
In May 2001, Abu Sayyaf gunmen entered the luxury Dos Palmas Resort in Honda Bay just off the coast of Puerto Princesa and kidnapped 20 people from the resort, including four resort staff and three Americans.

On the morning of 24 January 2011, broadcast journalist and former politician Gerry Ortega was at an "ukay-ukay" (used clothing) thrift store in Puerto Princesa when he was murdered by a gunman. After a brief chase, police apprehended the alleged shooter, Marlon Recamata, who confessed to the crime at the Puerto Princesa Police Office and implicated three other persons. In 2015, former Palawan governor Mario Joel Reyes was arrested in Thailand after being charged by the city court in connection with the crime. Various courts went back and forth in ordering the arrest or non-arrest of Reyes, with him being released from jail in 2018 upon orders of the Court of Appeals but ultimately ordered rearrested in 2023, with him surrendering to the National Bureau of Investigation in Metro Manila in September 2024.

== Geography ==
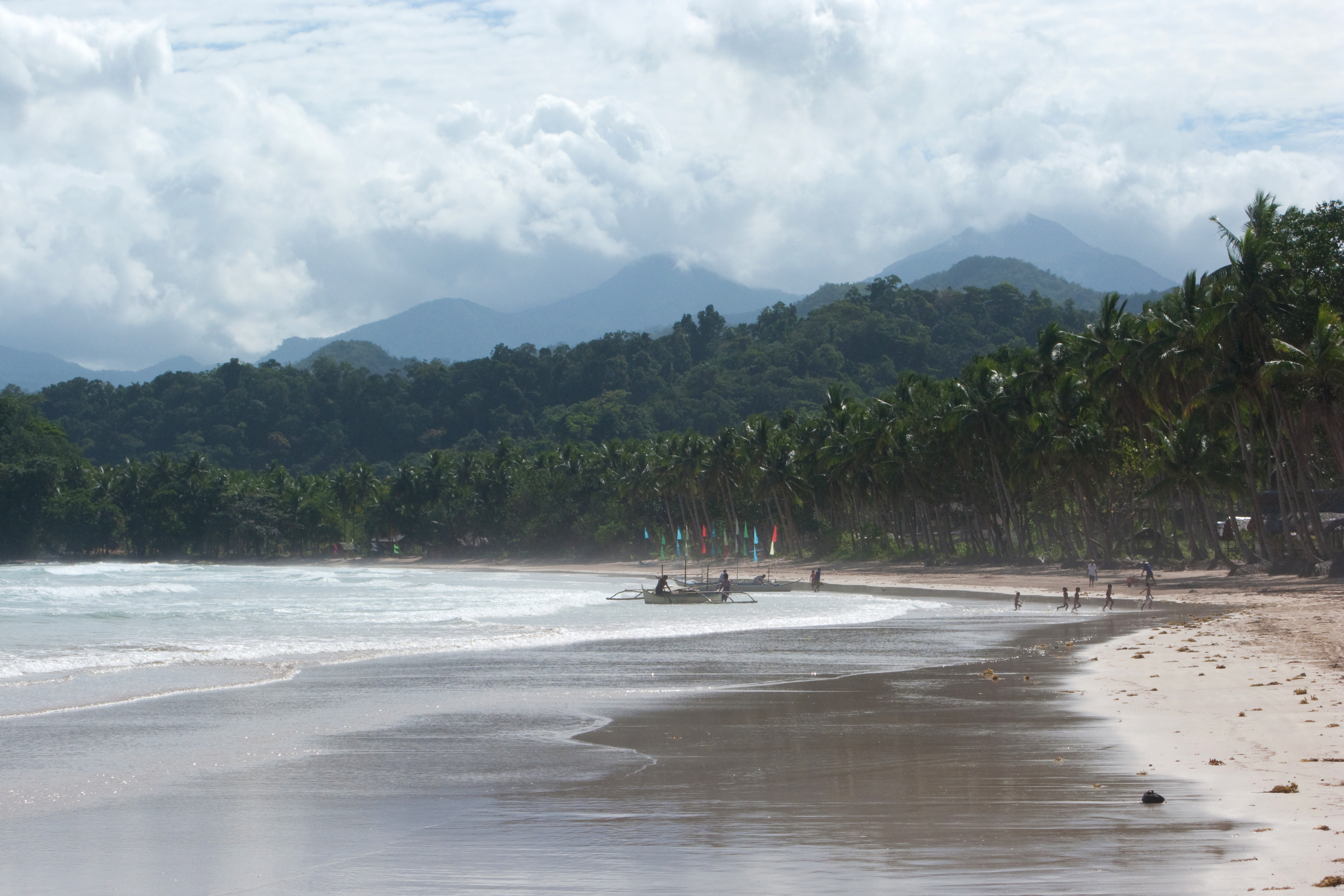
Sabang Beach

Puerto Princesa is located in the mid-section of Palawan Island. It is bound to the east by the Sulu Sea, to the west by the South China Sea, to the north by the municipalities of San Vicente and Roxas, and to the south by the municipality of Aborlan. It is approximately 306 nautical miles (567 km) from the Philippine capital of Manila, 205 nautical miles (380 km) from Panay and 250 nautical miles (460 km) from Zamboanga City on the southern Philippine island of Mindanao.

=== Barangays ===
Puerto Princesa is politically subdivided into 66 barangays. Each barangay consists of puroks and some have sitios.

These barangays are grouped into two districts. Currently, there are 35 barangays of which are classified as urban barangays.

- Babuyan (Rural) 2,472
- Bacungan (Rural) 4,555
- Bagong Bayan (Rural) 827
- Bagong Pag-Asa (Urban) 750
- Bagong Sikat (Urban) 7,497
- Bagong Silang (Urban) 5,296
- Bahile (Rural) 2,339
- Bancao-bancao (Urban) 13,612
- Barangay ng mga Mangingisda (Rural) 5,350
- Binduyan (Rural) 1,293
- Buenavista (Rural) 1,212
- Cabayugan (Rural) 3,368
- Concepcion (Rural) 1,418
- Inagawan (Rural) 1,623
- Inagawan Sub-Colony (Rural) 4,052
- Irawan (Urban) 6,142
- Iwahig (Rural) 4,527
- Kalipay (Urban) 725
- Kamuning (Rural) 1,978
- Langogan (Rural) 2,067
- Liwanag (Urban) 1,202
- Lucbuan (Rural) 1,401
- Luzviminda (Rural) 3,473
- Mabuhay (Urban) 206
- Macarascas (Rural) 1,609
- Magkakaibigan (Urban) 375
- Maligaya (Urban) 311
- Manalo (Rural) 2,143
- Mandaragat (Urban) 9,210
- Manggahan (Urban) 644
- Maningning (Urban) 791
- Maoyon (Rural) 1,281
- Marufinas (Rural) 609
- Maruyogon (Rural) 1,450
- Masigla (Urban) 609
- Masikap (Urban) 958
- Masipag (Urban) 1,971
- Matahimik (Urban) 1,228
- Matiyaga (Urban) 413
- Maunlad (Urban) 3,865
- Milagrosa (Urban) 3,100
- Model (Urban) 327
- Montible (Rural) 362
- Napsan (Rural) 1,797
- New Panggangan (Rural) 629
- Pagkakaisa (Urban) 1,131
- Princesa (Urban) 1,015
- Salvacion (Rural) 1,197
- San Jose (Urban) 17,521
- San Manuel (Urban) 12,510
- San Miguel (Urban) 19,649
- San Pedro (Urban) 22,089
- San Rafael (Rural) 1,836
- Santa Cruz (Rural) 840
- Santa Lourdes (Urban) 5,171
- Santa Lucia (Rural) 147
- Santa Monica (Urban) 20,094
- San Isidro (Urban) 312
- Sicsican (Urban) 15,861
- Simpocan (Rural) 1,272
- Tagabinet (Rural) 1,170
- Tagburos (Urban) 7,045
- Tagumpay (Urban) 465
- Tanabag (Rural) 700
- Tanglaw (Urban) 1,739
- Tiniguiban (Urban) 12,285

=== Climate ===
Puerto Princesa features a tropical wet and dry climate (Köppen climate classification Aw). It is usually wet from May to December, with very little rain from January to April. Average temperature is 27.43 °C (81.37 °F) while the annual average rainfall is 1,563.8 millimetres (61.57 in) per year. It is warm and humid all year round. On 23 April 2025 the town reached 37.0 °C (98.6 °F) for the first time in history.

Climate data for Puerto Princesa City (1991–2020, extremes 1951–present)
Month	Jan	Feb	Mar	Apr	May	Jun	Jul	Aug	Sep	Oct	Nov	Dec	Year
Record high °C (°F)	34.4 (93.9)	34.6 (94.3)	36.4 (97.5)	37.0 (98.6)	36.5 (97.7)	35.6 (96.1)	35.2 (95.4)	35.2 (95.4)	35.2 (95.4)	36.0 (96.8)	34.8 (94.6)	34.2 (93.6)	37.0 (98.6)
Mean daily maximum °C (°F)	30.9 (87.6)	31.1 (88.0)	31.9 (89.4)	32.9 (91.2)	32.9 (91.2)	32.1 (89.8)	31.5 (88.7)	31.6 (88.9)	31.7 (89.1)	31.6 (88.9)	31.4 (88.5)	31.0 (87.8)	31.7 (89.1)
Daily mean °C (°F)	27.3 (81.1)	27.4 (81.3)	28.1 (82.6)	28.9 (84.0)	29.1 (84.4)	28.4 (83.1)	28.0 (82.4)	28.0 (82.4)	28.0 (82.4)	27.9 (82.2)	27.9 (82.2)	27.7 (81.9)	28.1 (82.6)
Mean daily minimum °C (°F)	23.8 (74.8)	23.7 (74.7)	24.3 (75.7)	25.0 (77.0)	25.3 (77.5)	24.8 (76.6)	24.4 (75.9)	24.3 (75.7)	24.3 (75.7)	24.2 (75.6)	24.4 (75.9)	24.3 (75.7)	24.4 (75.9)
Record low °C (°F)	18.3 (64.9)	18.5 (65.3)	19.2 (66.6)	20.9 (69.6)	21.3 (70.3)	16.2 (61.2)	20.6 (69.1)	20.5 (68.9)	20.6 (69.1)	20.9 (69.6)	19.2 (66.6)	19.2 (66.6)	16.2 (61.2)
Average rainfall mm (inches)	55.6 (2.19)	30.7 (1.21)	37.1 (1.46)	49.3 (1.94)	125.8 (4.95)	157.0 (6.18)	170.4 (6.71)	173.4 (6.83)	172.0 (6.77)	212.9 (8.38)	196.3 (7.73)	174.9 (6.89)	1,555.4 (61.24)
Average rainy days (≥ 0.1 mm)	5	3	4	5	10	14	15	14	14	15	12	9	120
Average relative humidity (%)	80	79	78	77	80	83	84	84	84	84	84	82	82
Source: PAGASA

== Demographics ==
Population census of Puerto Princesa

Year	Pop.	±% p.a.
1903	1,208	—
1918	6,427	+11.79%
1939	10,887	+2.54%
1948	15,177	+3.76%
1960	23,125	+3.57%
1970	37,774	+5.02%

Year	Pop.	±% p.a.
1975	45,709	+3.90%
1980	60,234	+5.67%
1990	92,147	+4.34%
1995	129,577	+6.60%
2000	161,912	+4.89%
2007	210,508	+3.69%

Year	Pop.	±% p.a.
2010	222,673	+2.07%
2015	255,116	+2.62%
2020	307,079	+3.98%
2024	316,384	+0.72%

Source: Philippine Statistics Authority

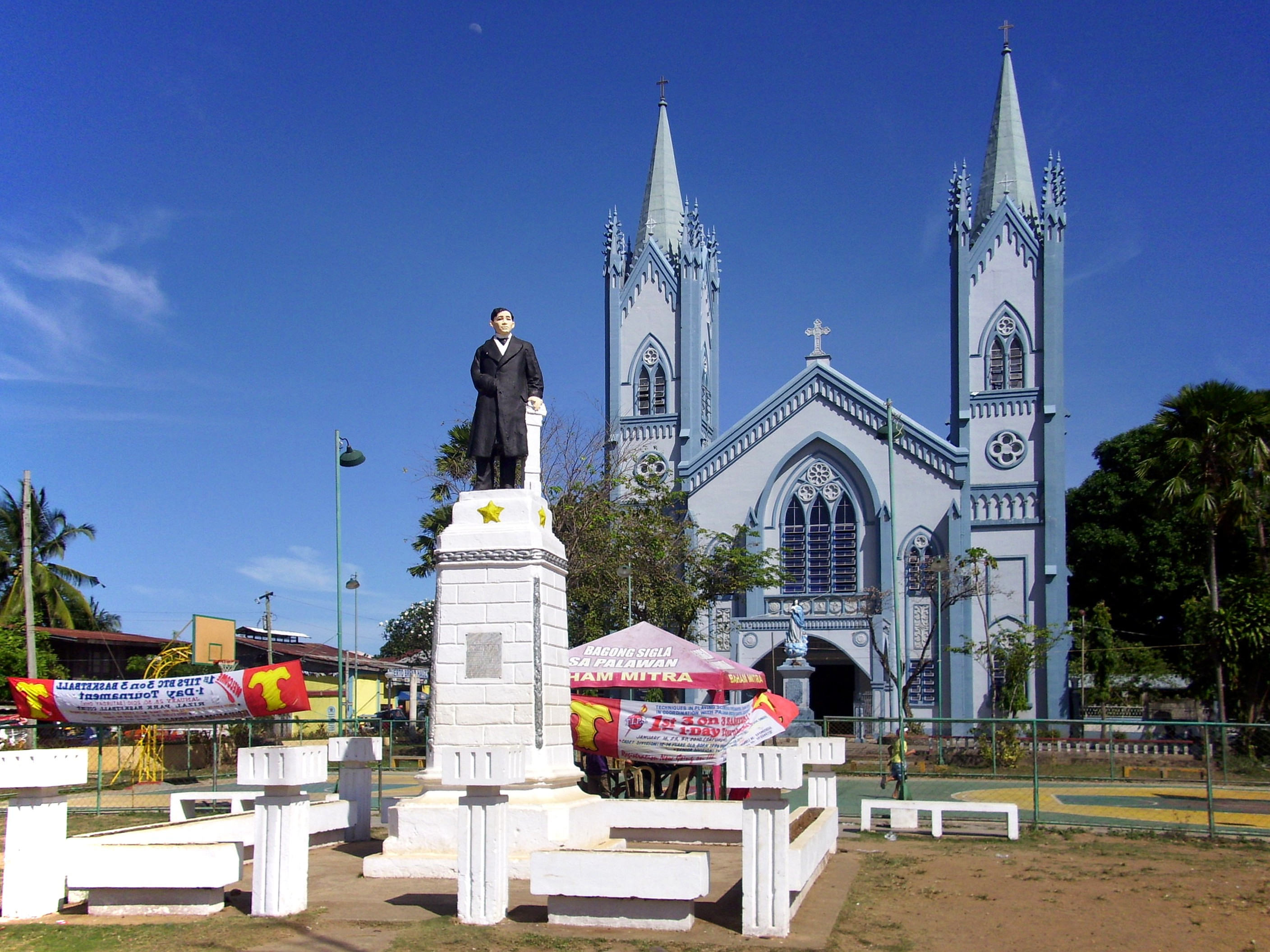
Immaculate Conception Cathedral and Rizal Park

In the 2024 census, the population of Puerto Princesa was 316,384 people, with a density of 130 inhabitants per square kilometer or 340 inhabitants per square mile.

Waves of migrants from other Philippine provinces, and even other countries, have turned Puerto Princesa into a melting pot of various cultures. Among the original inhabitants are the Cuyonons who have a rich legacy of folklore and traditions. Indigenous groups include the Tagbanwas, Palawanos, Molbogs and Bataks, each group with its distinct culture and system of beliefs.

Total inhabitants number 307,079 (as of 2020), of which three-quarter of the population resides in the city proper, an urban settlement on the shores of Puerto Princesa Bay. Although the predominant language is Tagalog, Cuyonon is widely spoken and used throughout the whole city, as well as Hiligaynon, other Visayan languages, and English.

== Economy ==
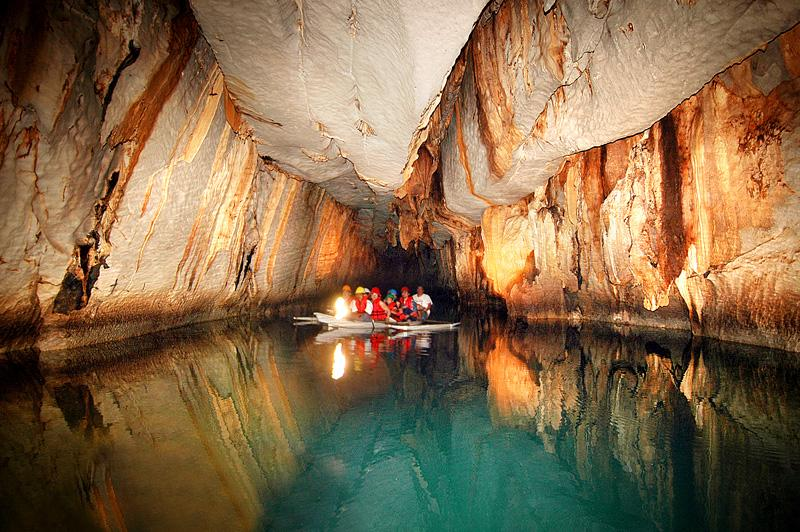
Interior of the Puerto Princesa Underground River

Poverty incidence of Puerto Princesa (%)

Source: Philippine Statistics Authority

Puerto Princesa is known as the "Eco-Tourism Center of the Philippines". In recent years, the city has seen an increase in the number of tourists bringing with them trade and businesses for the city. Many hotels ranging from basic to five-star luxury accommodations have been developed since the 1990s to cater to a growing number of foreign and local tourists in the city.

There are also a number of restaurants, bars and shopping malls, including the Robinsons Place Palawan, NCCC Mall Palawan, Unitop Mall Puerto Princesa, as well as the recently opened SM City Puerto Princesa.

Some tourists who come to Puerto Princesa visit the Puerto Princesa Subterranean River National Park, one of the New7Wonders of Nature, located 50 kilometers (31 mi) north of the city. The city is also the jump-off point for exploring the Tubbataha Reef.

== Transportation ==
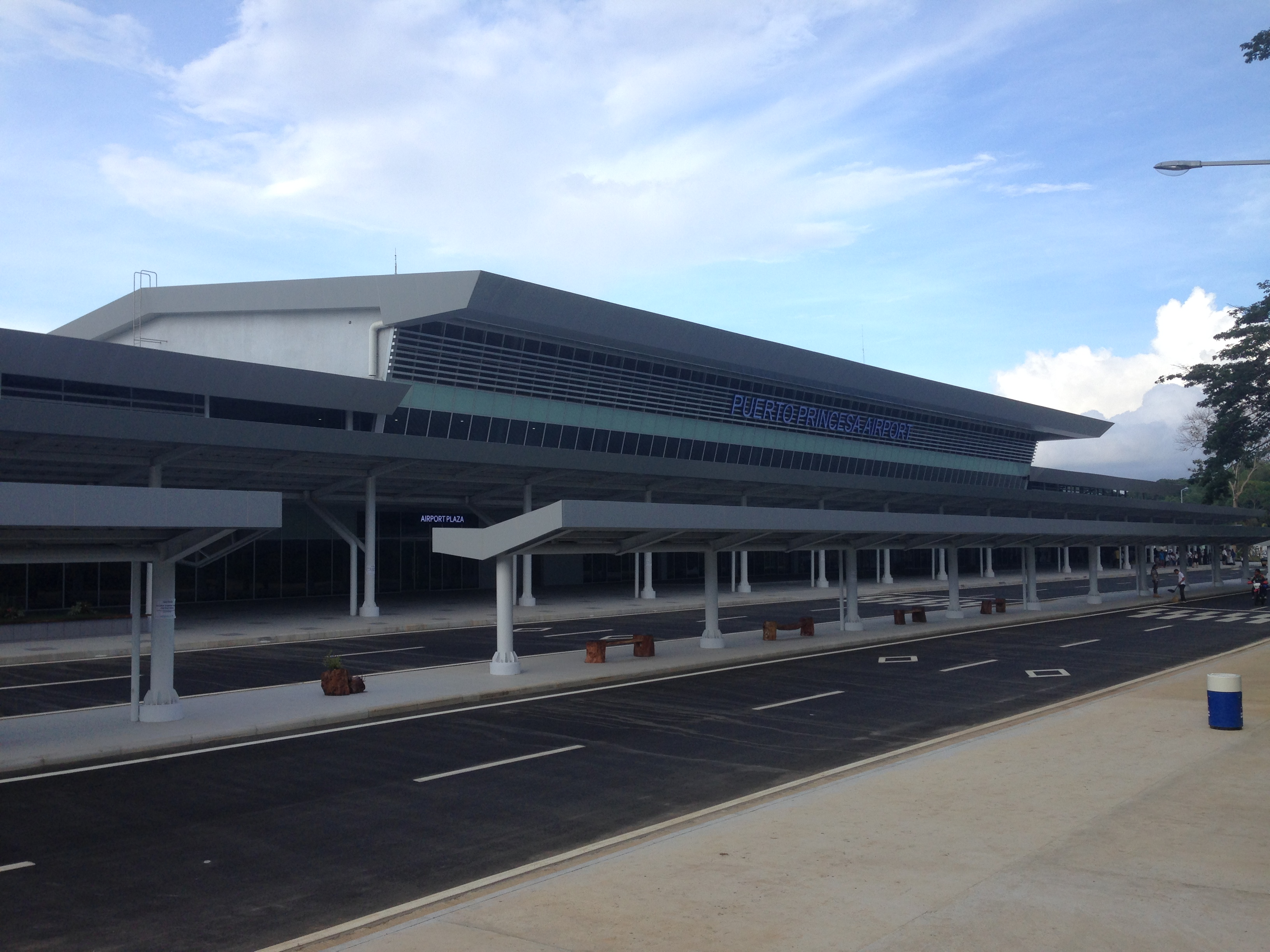
Puerto Princesa International Airport

=== Air ===
The Puerto Princesa International Airport is within the city proper. Puerto Princesa is accessible by direct flights to and from the major cities of the Philippines, such as Manila, Cebu, Davao, Iloilo, and Clark, as well as other parts of Palawan, such as Cuyo, Busuanga, San Vicente, and El Nido.

=== Sea ===
The city is served by domestic passenger ferries to Cuyo, Manila, Coron and Iloilo at the Port of Puerto Princesa.

=== Land ===
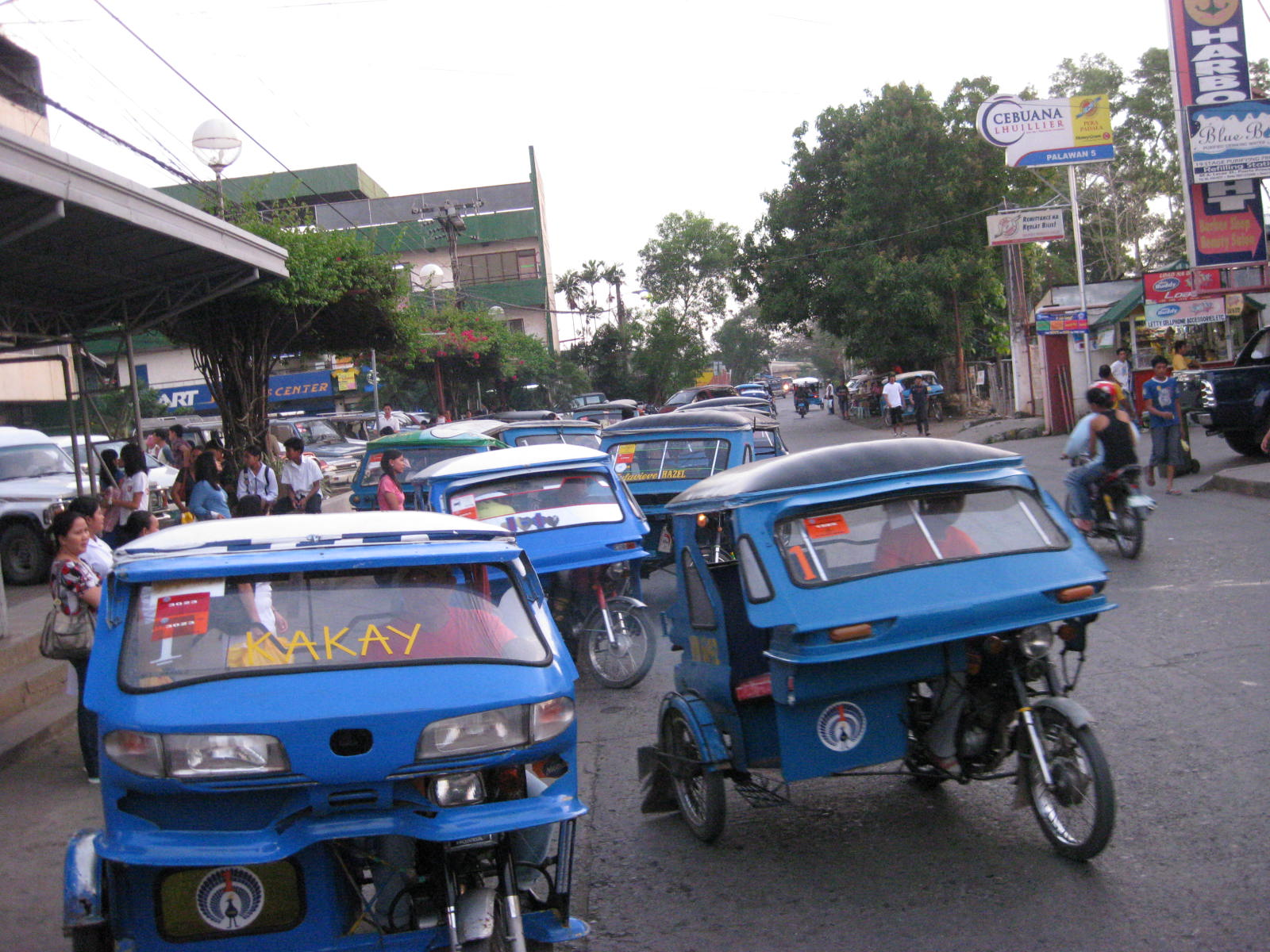
Tricycles within the city

The main modes of transport are via tricycles, jeepneys and vans-for-hire (or PUVs/public utility vehicles). Taxis started operating since April 2015, plying through the city center and nearby tourist destinations. Provincial buses and jeepneys operate from the San Jose terminal located 7 kilometers (4.3 mi) north of the city center off the National Highway.

==== E-tricycle ====
Then-Puerto Princesa Mayor Edward S. Hagedorn unveiled the environment friendly and economical electric-powered "Trikebayan" (which does not emit any noise or carbon monoxide) at the Kapihan sa Sulo forum, Sulo Hotel, Quezon City. The Trikebayan costs only ₱48 or $1.20 per day to operate, while a gasoline-powered tricycle operation would cost ₱200. Rolly Concepcion, who conceptualized the Trikebayan, said that converting a tricycle engine to electric costs ₱68,000. The rechargeable battery under the passenger seat can run for 12 hours. There was a dealership for these trikes on the north highway but it closed down in 2011.

Although Puerto Princesa has this bold plan for electric vehicles, the municipal government and tourist office has stated (when asked by a tourist in August 2011), that it has no published or announced plan for providing for the current and future needs and safety of pedestrians or bicycle riders. Spaces for walking and bicycling from one place to another are not being considered.

== Healthcare ==
Hospitals in the city include:

- MMG-PPC Cooperative Hospital
- Ospital ng Palawan
- Palawan Adventist Hospital
- Palawan Medical City
- Palawan Medical Plaza
- Palawan Doctors Diagnostics & Multi-Speciality Center
- ACE Medical Center

== Government ==
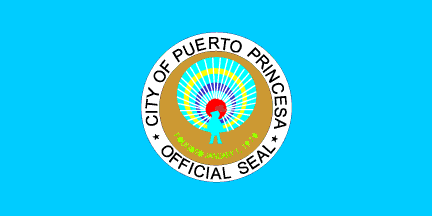
Old flag of Puerto Princesa

Elected and appointed public officials have governed Puerto Princesa, with a strong mayor-council government. The city political government is composed of the mayor, vice mayor, ten councilors, one Sangguniang Kabataan (SK) Federation representative, an Association of Barangay Captains (ABC) representative and Indigenous People's Mandatory Representative (IPMR). Each official is elected publicly to a three-year terms.

The following are the current city officials of Puerto Princesa:

- House of Representatives Congressman: Gil A. Acosta Jr. (Lakas-CMD)
- Mayor: Lucilo R. Bayron (PFP)
- Vice Mayor: Peter Q. Maristela (LP)
- City Council Members:
  - Matthew K. Mendoza
  - Luis M. Marcaida III
  - Victor S. Oliveros
  - Modesto V. Rodriguez
  - Elgin Robert L. Damasco
  - Gerry C. Abad
  - Patrick Alex M. Hagedorn
  - Epitacio D. Lao Jr.
  - Eleuterius L. Edualino
  - Herbert S. Dilig
  - Francisco R. Gabuco (Liga ng mga Barangay President, Ex-officio Member)
  - Johnmart M. Salunday (Ex-officio Member, Indigenous People Representative)
  - Karl Dylan Aquino (Pres., Sk Federation, Ex-officio Member)

== Media ==
=== Television networks ===
All of the major television broadcasting channels' regional offices are located in the city. Advanced Media Broadcasting System; ALLTV2 Channel 7 are broadcast through which is also stationed in the city. Bandera News Philippines's airs shows via channel 40 Local Shows Such as Alerto 38, TV5 Channel 29, (RPTV and One Sports DTV Channel 18), GMA Network's channel 12 and GTV channel 27 (Heart of Asia and I Heart Movies DTV Channel 15) are also available.

=== Cable and satellite TV ===
The city's cable and satellite TV companies include Puerto Princesa Cable Television (PPCATV)

=== Radio stations ===
Puerto Princesa has a number of FM and AM radio stations, some of which operate 24 hours daily.

== Twin towns and sister cities ==
=== Local ===
- (Philippines) Quezon City, Metro Manila
- (Philippines) General Santos

=== International ===
- Haikou, Hainan, China
- Hsinchu, Taiwan, since February 10, 2006
- (United States) Maui County, Hawaii, USA, since March 5, 1999

== Notable personalities ==
- Daryl Ong – singer
- Raul Mitra – composer
- Ramon Mitra Jr. – former House Speaker
- Abraham Kahlil Mitra – former Governor of Palawan and Games And Amusement Board Chairperson
- Samantha Bernardo - Beauty pageant titlist (Miss Grand International 2020 - 1st Runner-up, Bb. Pilipinas Grand International 2020, Bb. Pilipinas 2018 and 2019 - 2nd Runner-up)

== Notable organizations ==
- Centre for Sustainability PH, Inc.
- Palawan Council for Sustainable Development
- Roots of Health

== See also ==
- Naval Base Puerto Princesa
