= Naval Base Puerto Princesa =

Major World War 2 base

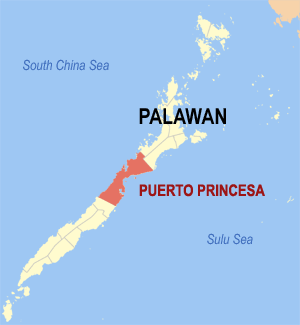
- Map with Puerto Princesa on Palawan Island highlighted in red

- Location within Philippines

Geography
- Location: South East Asia
- Coordinates: 9.75°N 118.75°E
- Archipelago: Philippine Islands
- Adjacent to: South China Sea; Sulu Sea

Administration
- Philippines
- Province: Palawan
- Naval Base 1945: United States Navy
- Capital and largest city: Puerto Princesa

Naval Base Puerto Princesa and Puerto Princesa Airfield in 1945

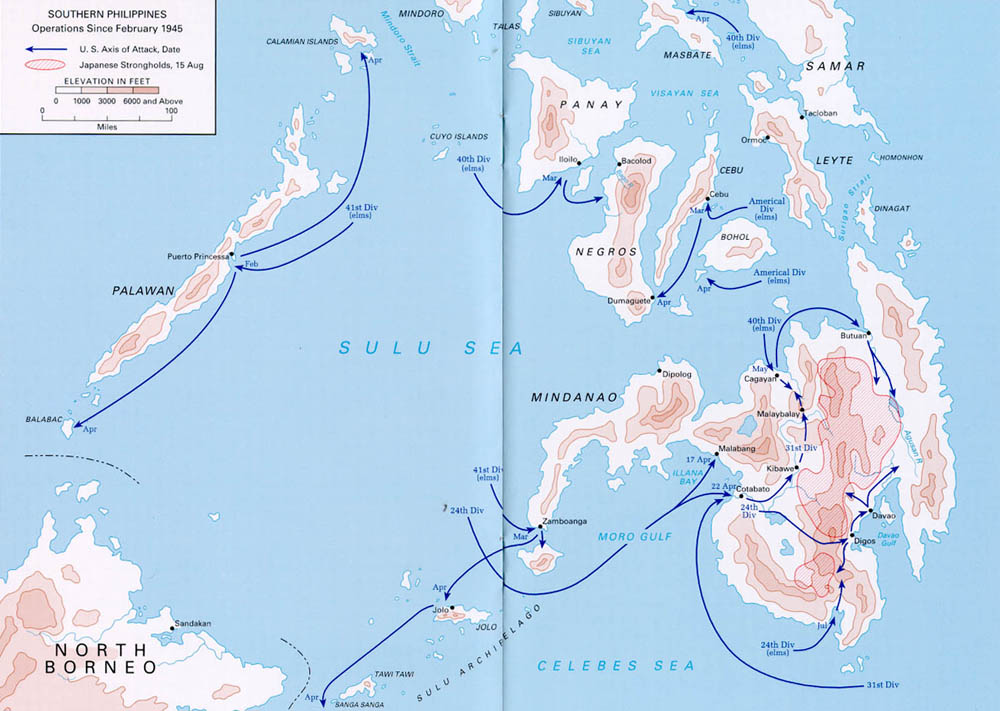
Invasion of Palawan map 1945

Naval Base Puerto Princesa 1945

Naval Base Puerto Princesa, Naval Base Palawan, was a United States Navy base built during World War II at Puerto Princesa on Palawan Island, Philippines, after the Invasion of Palawan on February 28, 1945. Puerto Princesa Bay offered an excellent base for fleet anchorage. At the naval base, US Navy Seabees built: a seaplane base, carrier aircraft fighter plane repair depot, land airfield and other base facilities.

== History ==
Palawan Island is an eastern island of the Philippines and is the fifth largest of the Philippine Islands. The island is 265 miles long and about 25 miles wide. The 84th Seabee Construction Battalion arrived at Puerto Princesa on March 12, 1945. Most of the captured Japanese facilities had been destroyed in bombing raids. One captured runway was easily repaired and was selected for repair and lengthening. The 84th Seabee Construction Battalion unloaded and loaned the needed equipment to the United States Army Engineers to work on the runway. The 84th Seabee Construction Battalion built all the other support facilities at the airfield. At the same time, the 84th Seabee Construction Battalion built all the needed port facilities. A large repair dept called a Carrier Aircraft Service Unit was built to service the planes on carrier aircraft. Naval Base Puerto Princesa was support by the very large Leyte-Samar Naval Base, east of Puerto Princesa. After the war, the base was closed and abandoned.

== Bases and facilities ==
- Fuel jetty to unload gasoline
- Aviation gasoline Tank farm
- Airfield camp, 2,500 troops
- Seabee Camp
- Seabee depot
- Radar station
- Fleet Post Office FPO# 3291 SF
- Naval hospital - small
- Supply Depot
- Repair Depot
- Coral quarry
- Repair base camp, barracks and mess hall
- Three Carrier Aircraft Service Units
- Power plant
- Machine shops
- Ammunition depot
- Water plant for camp and to supply ships in the port.
- Fresh water tank farm, 126,000-gallons
- USS Pollux (AKS-4) general stores issue ship

== Airfields ==
- Puerto Princesa Airfield now Puerto Princesa International Airport

=== Puerto Princesa Seaplane Base ===
Puerto Princesa Seaplane Base opened May 15, 1945. Seaplane ramps and a land base was built. A 500-man camp to support the base was built. The USS Pocomoke (AV-9), a seaplane tender serviced the planes of the US Navy Patrol Squadron, VP-17.

== Seabee units ==
Seabee units at Naval Base Puerto Princesa:

- 84th Seabee Construction Battalion
- Acorn 47
- Acorn 52

== Palawan massacre ==
Puerto Princesa is the site of the Palawan massacre. On December 14, 1944 Prisoner of war held by the Empire of Japan were killed to prevent the rescue of prisoners.

== See also ==
- U.S. Naval Base Subic Bay
- Espiritu Santo Naval Base
- US Naval Advance Bases
- Naval Advance Base Saipan
- Service Squadron
