= Palawan massacre =

1944 massacre in the Philippines by Japan

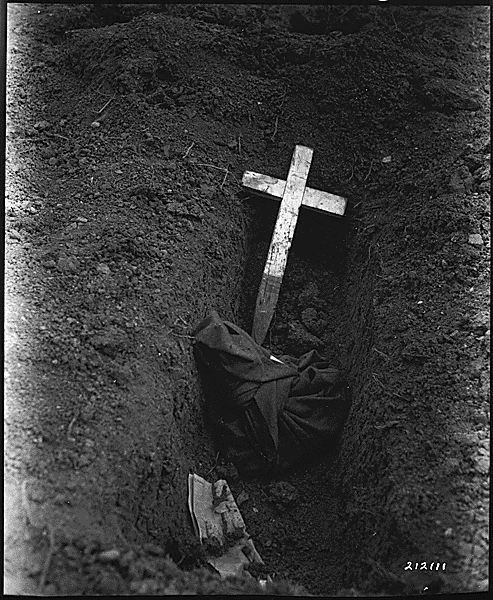
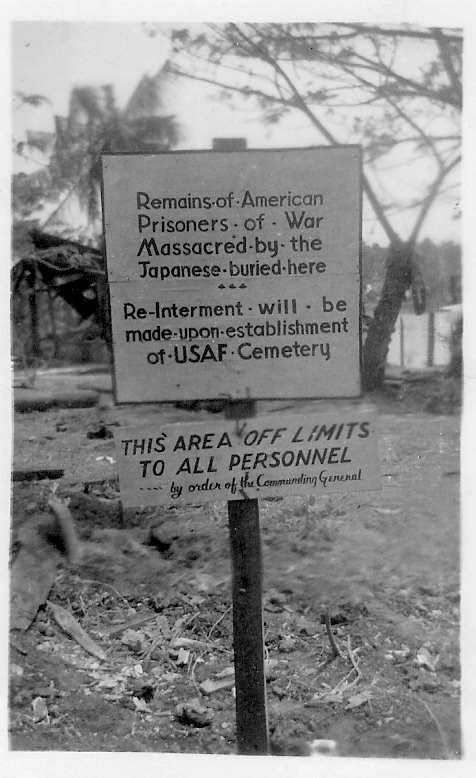
- U.S. Army personnel identified the charred remains of the Americans captured at Bataan and Corregidor and burned alive on Palawan, 20 March 1945 (left). Burial site of the Palawan Massacre, 14 December 1944. Photo taken by Bob Meza of the US Navy in March 1945 (right).
- Location: Puerto Princesa, Palawan, Philippines
- Date: 14 December 1944 (EDT)
- Target: Allied Prisoners of war
- Attack type: Mass murder, massacre
- Deaths: 139
- Perpetrators: Yoshikazu Sato; Imperial Japanese Army; Japanese Fourteenth Area Army

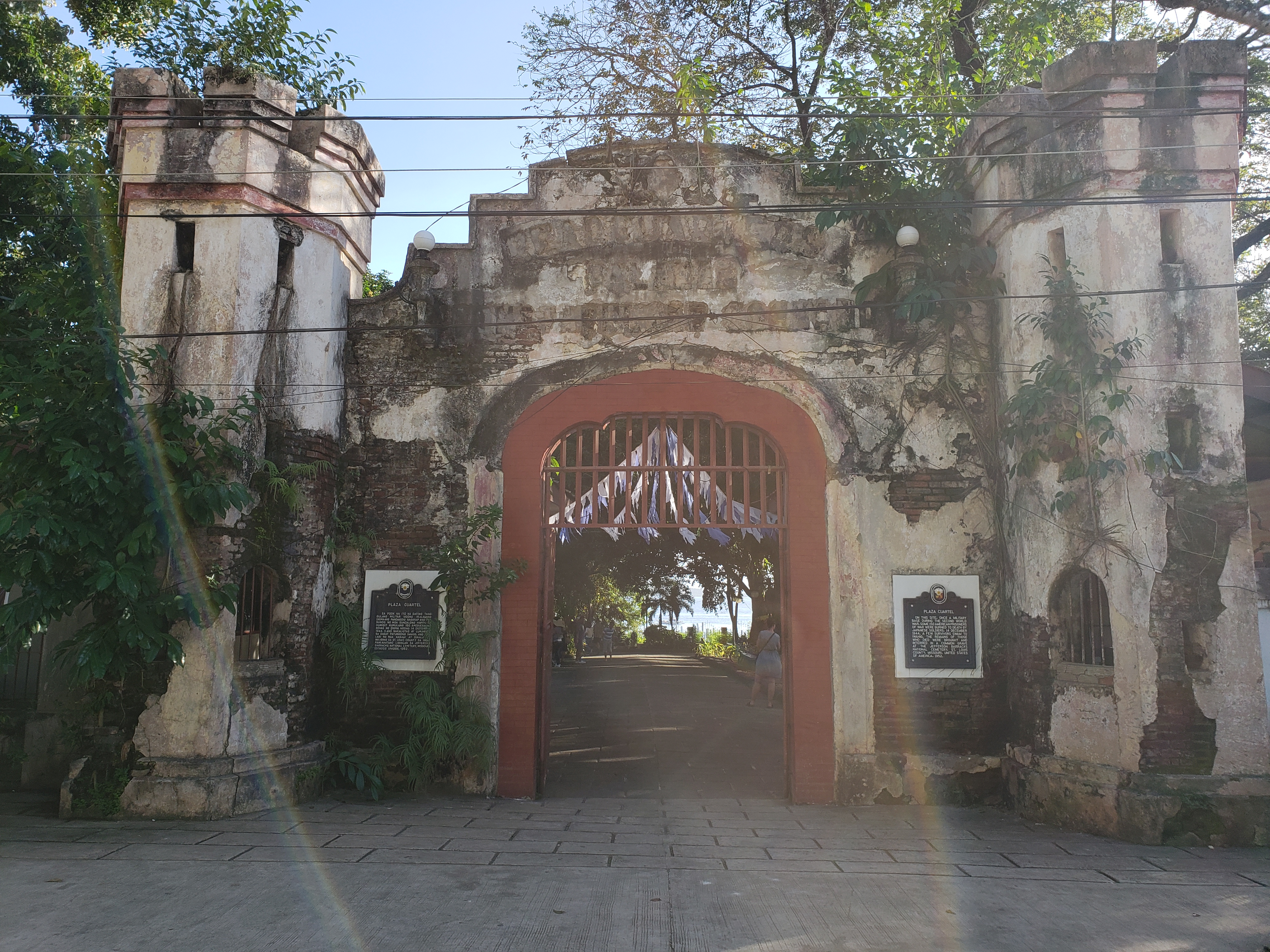
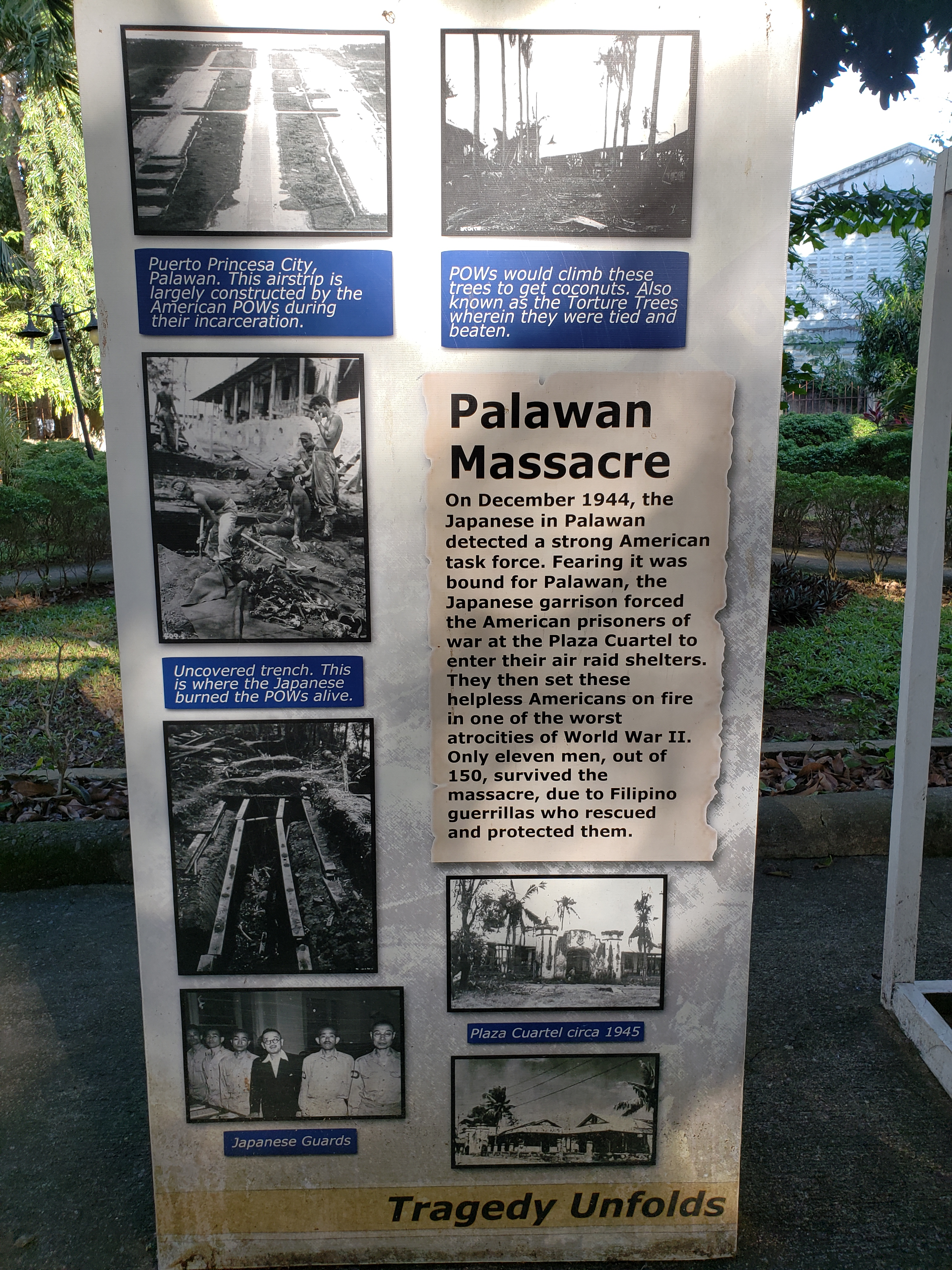
Plaza Cuartel, Puerto Princesa, site of the massacre

The Palawan massacre occurred on 14 December 1944, during World War II, near the city of Puerto Princesa in the Philippine island of Palawan. Allied soldiers, imprisoned near the city, were killed by Imperial Japanese soldiers. Only eleven men managed to survive, while 139 were killed.

== Background ==
On 12 August 1942, 300 American prisoners arrived on two transport ships, survivors of the Battle of Bataan and the Battle of Corregidor. They were interned in the old Philippine Constabulary barracks, referred to as Palawan's Prison Camp 10A, or Palawan Barracks. They would spend the next two years clearing an area 2,400 by 225 yards (2,195 by 206 m), and then building an 8-inch-thick (20 cm) concrete runway, 1,530 by 75 yards (1,399 by 69 m), using only hand tools, wheelbarrows and two small cement mixers. The prisoners were also forced to build revetments for 150 Japanese planes. Sick and useless prisoners were switched with healthier ones out of Manila during construction. On 22 September 1944, half of the prisoners were sent back to Manila. By October 1944, the airstrip and nearby harbor came under Allied attack. The prisoners were forced to dig bomb shelters within the prison compound, consisting of trenches 5 feet (1.5 m) deep and 4 feet (1.2 m) wide. Shelter A held 50 men, Shelter B held 35, and Shelter C held up to 30, and were augmented by smaller 2–3 man shelters. The shelters had a hidden exit that extended beyond the camp's barbed wire to a 60-foot (18 m) cliff overlooking the bay. Army Capt. Fred Bruni was the senior officer amongst the prisoners. Dr. Carl Mango, and Dr. Henry Knight, a dentist, were also amongst the prison population. Beatings were common, and rations eventually reduced to a mess kit of rice per day. There were 4 prison escape attempts. The first, on 11 August 1942, was made by 6 prisoners, 5 of whom were able to join the Filipino guerrillas at Brooke's Point in south Palawan. The second attempt, on 29 August 1942, by 2 prisoners was also successful through the aid of friendly Filipino guides. The third in February 1943, and the fourth on 28 June 1943, were not successful.

In August 1944, 1,800 men of the 131st Battalion, 2nd Air Division, were assigned to defend the airfield, under the command of Capt. Kojima. In December 1944, he sought advice "as to action to take regarding the POWs at the time of enemy landing." Lt. Gen. Seiichi Terada, 2nd Air Division commander, after conferring with Gen. Tominaga, 4th Army Commander, sent the following reply:

At the time of the enemy landing, if the POWs are harboring an enemy feeling, dispose of them at the appropriate time.

== Massacre ==
In order to prevent the rescue of prisoners of war by the advancing Allies, on 14 December 1944, units of the Japanese Fourteenth Area Army under the command of General Tomoyuki Yamashita, brought the POWs back to their own camp. An air raid warning was sounded to get the prisoners into the shelter trenches; the 150 prisoners of war at Puerto Princesa entered those air raid shelters: A, B, and C. The Japanese soldiers set them on fire using barrels of gasoline. The Japanese soldiers doused the entrances of the shelters with gasoline before lighting them on fire, then fired shots into the entrances to strike POWs in order to use the dead or dying POWs at the entrance to trap the other POWs deeper in the bunker in the inferno. They began the process with shelter A which was deep inside the camp. A few POWs from that shelter did manage to escape with burning clothing but were cut down by machine gun fire. Upon seeing that, the POWs in the other two shelters were alerted and attempted to dig themselves out. Relatively more fortunately, shelters B and C were located next to a cliff at the edge of the camp, so the escaping POWs dug themselves out towards the direction of the cliff before the two shelters were set alight. It was estimated about two dozen prisoners managed to get out before the shelters were set alight. However, for those POWs, their ordeal was not over; Japanese soldiers, upon seeing that some POWs manage to escape the shelter, then sent out a hunting party to hunt down those escaping POWs. Only 11 men completely escaped the slaughter and made it back to friendly lines; 139 were killed.

Those 11 that did escape to southern Palawan, and eventual rescue, were aided by Filipino scouts and guerrillas under the command of Nazario Mayor.

Upon receiving the news, Major General Charles A. Willoughby dispatched a navy PBY Catalina to link up with the scouts at Brooke's Point to pick up the surviving POWs and fly them to Allied-controlled Morotai, which the Japanese garrison on the island had surrendered back in September.

== Aftermath ==
On February 28, the 8th Army landed on Palawan as part of Operation VICTOR III. It is believed that many of the perpetrators of the massacre were killed in action or went missing defending the island in that campaign, including the camp commanding officer Lieutenant Yoshikazu "Buzzard" Sato, who carried out the massacre. Palawan garrison battalion commander Captain Nagayoshi Kojima and garrison company commander Lieutenant Sho Yoshiwara were also missing in action, and were not among the Japanese soldiers defending Palawan to surrender after the American campaign to retake the island.

Bones of the victims were discovered in early 1945.

General Tomoyuki Yamashita took the full blame and was charged with the Palawan massacre and other war crimes committed in the Philippines at his trial in 1945 under the doctrine of command responsibility. Under the principle that would later become known as the Yamashita Standard, he was convicted and hanged on 23 February 1946.

After the war, survivors Glenn McDole and Doug Bogue helped the US War Crimes Branch identify former guards and officers detained in Sugamo Prison, and interrogated in Tokyo's Dai-Ichi Building. Of the 33 charged with war crimes, 16 were put on trial, and 6 were acquitted. Those found guilty on 8 November 1948 included Lt. Gen. Seiichi Terada, sentenced to a life term, the Camp's Kempeitai commander Master Sergeant Taichi Deguchi, sentenced to be hanged but later commuted to a 30-year sentence by Gen. Douglas MacArthur, Superior Private Tomisaburo Sawa, sentenced to 5 years, head cook Manichi Nishitani, sentenced to 5 years, Lt. Gen. Kizo Mikama, sentenced to 12 years and Lt. Col. Mamoru Fushimi, sentenced to 10 years, while the remaining four were sentenced to 2–5 years. However, on December 31, 1958, all those remaining in prison were freed under a general amnesty for Japanese war crimes prisoners.

The diary of a Japanese sergeant major had the following entry for 15 December 1944:

Due to the sudden change of situation, the 150 prisoners of war were executed. Those who escaped were discovered this morning in the Puerto Princesa antiaircraft trench and were shot. They truly died a pitiful death.

Another officer, Lieutenant Colonel Satoshi Oie, was tried separately. He was found guilty of crimes related to the murders of Filipino and Chinese civilians, sentenced to death, and executed by firing squad in Japan on 23 October 1948.

== Appearance in media ==
The massacre most recently has been the subject of the book As Good as Dead, the Daring Escape of American POWs From a Japanese Death Camp: Stephen L. Moore and also the basis for the book Last Man Out: Glenn McDole, USMC, Survivor of the Palawan Massacre in World War II by Bob Wilbanks, and the opening scenes of the 2005 Miramax film, The Great Raid.

Evidence of the episode has been recorded by two of the eleven survivors: Glenn McDole and Rufus Willie Smith from the 4th US Marines.

The massacre is also mentioned in the second season of the Apple TV series "Pachinko."

== See also ==
- Iwahig Prison and Penal Farm
