= Heart of Asia =

Heart of Asia may refer to:

== Geography ==
The location of Afghanistan and its neighboring countries from different regions.

- A term coined to highlight the geostrategic location of Afghanistan at the center of Asia's trade and economic junction between Central Asia, West Asia, South Asia and East Asia.(s. Istanbul Process).
- A nickname for the East Asian island of Taiwan, a territory controlled by the Republic of China with some nearby smaller islands

== Music ==
- "Fortress of Islam, Heart of Asia", the Afghan national anthem from 1992 to 2006
- "Heart of Asia", a 1999 remix of "Merry Christmas Mr. Lawrence" by Watergate

== Television ==
- Heart of Asia Channel, a Philippine free-to-air digital television channel owned by GMA Network
