= Invasion of Palawan =

1945 battle between the US and Japan

- Part of the Pacific Theater of World War II
- Naval Base Puerto Princesa and Puerto Princesa Airfield in 1945
Date	28 February – 22 April 1945
Location	Palawan island, Philippines
Result	Allied victory

Belligerents
United States: Philippine Commonwealth	Japan: Philippine Republic

Commanders and leaders
(United States) Robert L. Eichelberger (United States) Thomas C. Kinkaid (United States) Jens A. Doe (United States) Harold H. Haney (United States) William M. Fechteler	(Empire of Japan) Sōsaku Suzuki †

Strength
5,000 U.S. troops	2,000 Japanese troops

Casualties and losses
12 killed 56 wounded	900 killed 140 wounded

The Invasion of Palawan (Filipino: Paglusob sa Palawan) consisted of a series of actions officially designated Operation Victor I and Operation Victor II, fought by U.S. forces against the Japanese military from 28 February to 22 April 1945 as a part of the campaign for the liberation of the Philippines during World War II. The aim of the invasion was the recapture of the southern islands of the Philippine archipelago and liberating them from Japanese occupation.

== Background ==
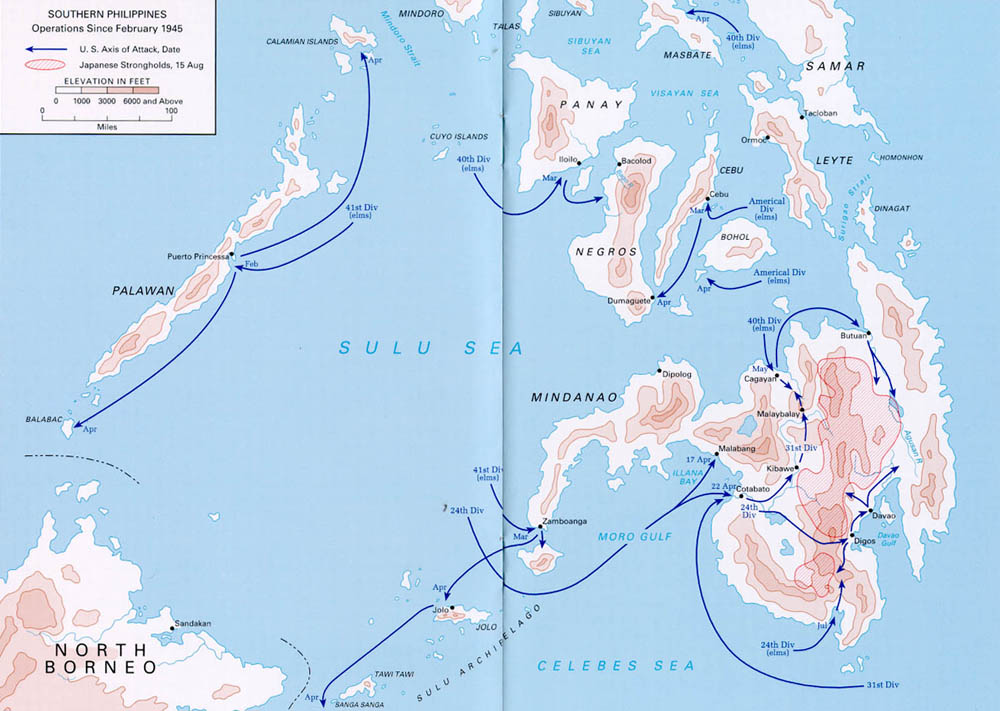
Map of U.S. operations in Southern Philippines, 1945

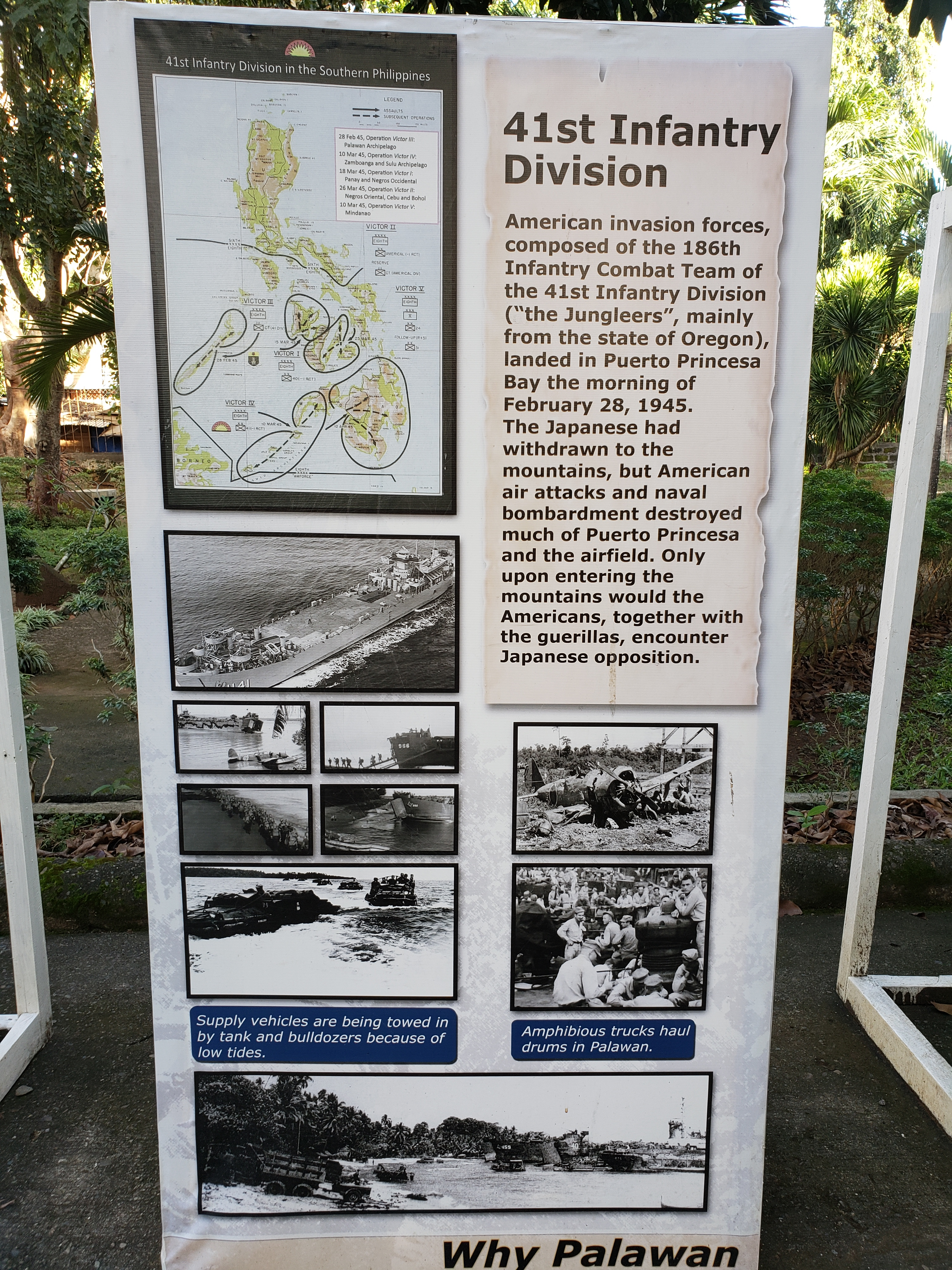
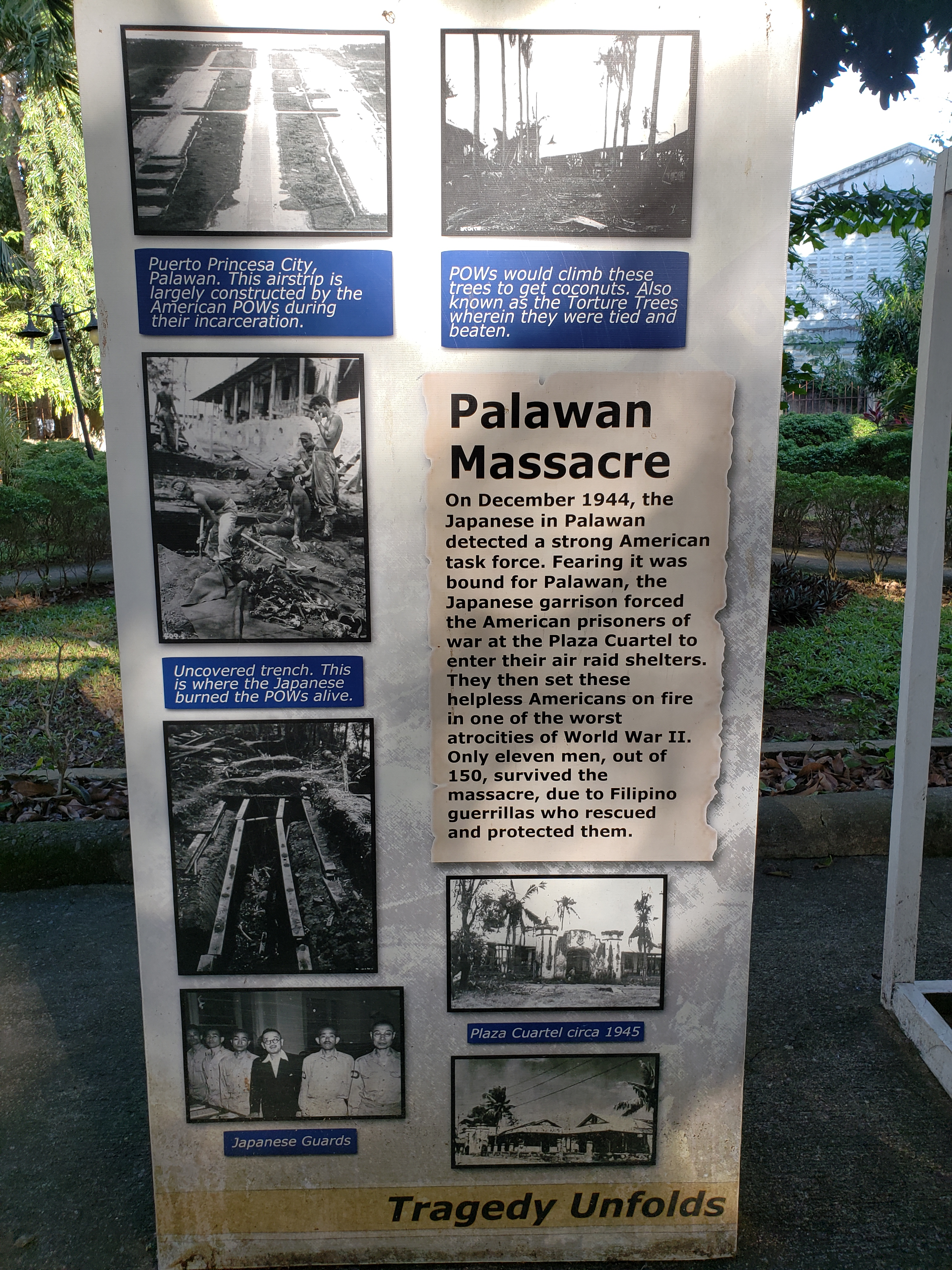
Plaza Cuartel Museum historical markers, Puerto Princesa

Douglas MacArthur planned to liberate the entirety of the Philippines from the Japanese occupation after leaving in 1942.

The Japanese launched an anti-malaria campaign in Palawan in 1943, but there was not a large enough supply quinine by the time the Japanese were expelled from the island.

The 868th BS conducted bombing raids on Japanese airfields in Palawan in 1944. The American submarine USS Barbel was destroyed off the coast of Palawan by Japanese aircraft on 4 February 1945.

== Planning ==
Invasion of Palawan, Puerto Princesa in 1945

According to the MUSKETEER II plan of 26 September 1944, the Eighth Army under Robert L. Eichelberger would occupy the central and southern islands of the Philippines after taking control of Luzon with the Sixth Army. The Eighth Army would then move onto the Dutch East Indies.

Rear Admiral William Fechteler made plans for the invasion of Palawan. MacArthur issued an order on 6 February 1945, calling for the Eighth Army to launch its invasion of Palawan through Puerto Princesa on 28 February. The army would then move onwards to Zamboanga City on Mindanao and the Sulu Archipelago on 10 March.

The naval attack group would be led by Fechteler, the covering group led by Ralph S. Riggs, and the military force led by Harold Haney. The 8th Amphibious Group and 41st Infantry Division were assigned. The Far East Air Force would be used to cut Japanese sea lines through the South China Sea.

A large amount of the coast of Palawan is covered by sand banks, coral reefs, and mangrove swamps. Puerto Princesa was a good harbour on the island. Puerto Princesa lacked any beaches suitable for landing craft and the Americans would instead use Landing Vehicle, Tracked (LVT). Landing Ship Medium (LSM) and Landing Ship, Tank (LST) would then be landed once a hydrographic party could find a proper location for them. American intelligence reported a Japanese force of 2,735 men in Palawan, with 1,800 being positioned around Puerto Princesa.

The light cruisers Denver, Cleveland, and Montpelier, and four destroyers were assigned to conduct a preliminary bombardment.

A rehearsal for the invasion was held at Mindoro on 24 February.

== Attack ==
=== First day ===
The invasion force sortied on 26 February American forces were deployed at 6:50 AM on 28 February. The 186th Infantry Regiment and 41st Infantry Division landed at Puerto Princesa with no opposition. No defensive positions were found at Puerto Princesa The objects for the first day were achieved by 1:00 PM. A company landed at Iwahig River at 3:30 PM and faced some small-arms fire.

The victims of the Palawan massacre conducted on 14 December 1944 were discovered and later given a proper burial.

A destroyer screen outside the harbour of Puerto Princesa was established by Fechteler.

=== Later developments ===
American forces first met Japanese resistance on 2 March. The Japanese withdrew to the mountains and western coast of the island. An airstrip was in operation near Puerto Princesa by 20 March.

Eichelberger issued an order on 6 March, for Haney to seize Busuanga Island and Culion. On 15 March he called for Balabac Strait to be secured. American forces landed on Busuanga Island on 9 April, and killed ten Japanese soldiers.

American forces landed on Dumaran Island on 9 March, and discovered that it was ungarrisoned.

American forces marched across the island and reached Alfonso XIII on 15 April.

American forces landed on Balabac Island on 16 April, and faced no opposition. American forces landed on Bugsuk on 22 April.

The Japanese garrison of Pandanon Island was attacked by PT boats in March, but the island was found deserted when a landing party arrived on 22 April.

== See also ==
- Palawan massacre
- Military History of the Philippines during World War II
- Military history of the United States
- Military history of Japan
- History of the Philippines

== Works cited ==
=== Books ===
- Morison, Samuel (1975). History of the United States Naval Operations in World War II: The Liberation of the Philippines Luzon, Mindanao, the Visaya 1944-1945. Vol. 13. Atlantic Monthly Press.

=== Journals ===
- Bedessem, Edward (1994). "World War II Chronology". Army History. 32. United States Army Center of Military History: 18–20. doi:10.2307/26304246. JSTOR 26304246.
- Cahill, William (2017). "Thirteenth Air Force Radio Countermeasures Operations, 1944-45". Air Power History. 64 (2). Air Force Historical Foundation: 9–28. doi:10.2307/26571009. JSTOR 26571009.
- Danquah, Francis (2005). "Reports on Philippine Industrial Crops in World War II from Japan's English Language Press". Agricultural History. 79 (1). Duke University Press: 74–96. doi:10.2307/3744878. JSTOR 3744878.
