= Battle of Davao =

1945 World War II battle in the Philippines

Battle of Davao (Battle of Ising)
- Part of Philippines Campaign, World War II
- US 24th Infantry Division march towards Davao
Date	April 27 to June 10, 1945
Location	Davao City, Davao Province, Mindanao island, Commonwealth of the Philippines (now Republic of the Philippines)
Result	Allied victory
Territorial changes	Davao City and Davao Province liberated by the Allies

Belligerents
United States: Commonwealth of the Philippines	Japan: Second Philippine Republic

Commanders and leaders
(United States) Douglas MacArthur (United States) Robert L. Eichelberger (United States) Clarence A. Martin (United States) Roscoe B. Woodruff (United States) Wendell W. Fertig (Commonwealth of the Philippines) Basilio J. Valdes (Commonwealth of the Philippines) Federico G. Ubuza (Commonwealth of the Philippines) Armando Generoso (Commonwealth of the Philippines) Saturnino Silva	(Empire of Japan) Gyosaku Morozumi (Empire of Japan) Jiro Harada (Empire of Japan) Muraji Kawazoe

Units involved
(United States) X Corps: 24th Infantry Division; 31st Infantry Division; 130th Infantry Regiment; (Commonwealth of the Philippines) Local guerrilla units	(Empire of Japan) 14th Army: 100th Division

Strength
108,000 total (United States) 38,000 men	(Empire of Japan) 15,000 men, shore batteries, artillery and suicide boats

Casualties and losses
US: 350 dead, 1,615 wounded	4,500 in Davao City, ~3,000 in Ising
- Thousands of civilians dead, wounded, missing and made homeless.

The Battle of Davao (Filipino: Labanan sa Davao; Cebuano: Gubat sa Davao) also known as the Battle of Ising was a major battle in which American and Philippine Commonwealth troops including locally organized guerrillas fought the Japanese to liberate the city of Davao. This battle is the only successful battle in the Philippines against the Japanese invaders which the bloodiest battle happen in then Sitio Ising, Municipality of Panabo (now Barangay Ising, Carmen) in Davao del Norte. The battle is part of Operation VICTOR V, an offensive operation against Japanese forces in Mindanao, and part of the campaign for the liberation of the Philippines during World War II. The battle was the decisive engagement of the Mindanao campaign.

== Background ==
Davao was among the first cities in the Philippines to be occupied by Japanese troops in 1942. There was organized guerrilla resistance in Mindanao afterwards, the most prominent one commanded by Wendell W. Fertig, and was largely successful in tying down Japanese units in the island long before the liberation of Philippines began in 1944.

With its navy decisively crushed at the Battle of Leyte Gulf six months earlier, the Japanese in Mindanao were now cut off from their main bases in Luzon. The Allies began their Mindanao assault in 10 March and saw spectacular success after, despite the problems posed by the island itself, such as its inhospitable terrain, irregular coastline, few roads which complicated supply chains, and the thick defense of the Japanese forces.

== Prelude ==
The Allies had already taken much of Central Mindanao, having destroyed several Japanese units in Malaybalay and Cabacan sectors beginning 17 April. By this time the Allies were preparing for the assault in Davao City. The strongest of the Japanese defenses in the island were concentrated around the Davao Gulf area, which was heavily mined to counter an amphibious landing, and in Davao City, the island's largest and most important city. Artillery and anti-aircraft batteries extensively ringed the coastal shoreline defenses. Believing that the Americans would ultimately attack from Davao Gulf and also anticipating that they would eventually be driven from the city, the Japanese also prepared defensive bunkers inland behind its perimeter where they could retire and regroup, with the intention of prolonging the campaign as much as possible.

== Dispositions and terrain ==
Soldiers from the American 8th Army were yet to land from their ships steaming in Davao Gulf heading towards Davao City. With Allied assistance, separate large-sized Philippine guerrilla units were already being formed in eastern and southern Davao Province in anticipation for the upcoming battle.

Defending the city was the role of the Japanese 100th Division under General Harada. With its headquarters at the peak of the Shrine Hills, west of the city center, where it offered a strategic vantage point over the Allies as well as commanding view of Davao Gulf where American amphibious units were to disembark, it anchored its defenses at Catigan, thirteen miles southwest from the city center; The Right Sector Unit of five infantry battalions, and in the hills twelve miles north of Davao, The Left Sector Unit of four infantry battalions. The center, overlooking Libby Airdrome, was manned by three battalions. Before the battle began, they already had a vast tunnel network built in the city's hills to counter the Allied assaults and to shield them from air attacks and artillery shelling, as well as to necessitate the shifting of troops during the battle; some of them are still in use for the city's tourism purposes.

== Battle ==
The battle began on 27 April when the first American units of Gen. Roscoe B. Woodruff's 24th Division reached what is now Digos, then part of Sta. Cruz town. The division moved westward across Mindanao so rapidly that the Americans and Filipinos were almost on top of the Japanese around Davao before Gen. Morozumi learned too late that the western landing was, in fact, not diversionary. By the time the division reached Digos, the Americans quickly overrun the Japanese defenses who were prepared only to repel an assault from the sea westward, not from their rear to the east. The 24th Division immediately turned north and headed toward Davao City.

=== Combat inside Davao City ===
On 3 May 1945, after months of incessant and intense bombardment by American land-based and carrier-based planes and warships, the first combat elements of the 24th Division entered Davao City against less opposition than had been expected. While it took just 15 days, despite severe heat and humidity and constant rain, with an entire division traveling 115 mi (185 km) and seizing the last major Philippine city under Japanese control, the real battle for Mindanao had begun. Up to a point, X Corps had bypassed the main Japanese defenses of the 100th Division, which was inland on higher ground, and where they would now need to be eliminated.

Filipino soldiers of the guerrilla 108th Division cleared the Davao Gulf coast for fifteen miles south of Digos. On 30 April, the 21st Infantry attacked toward Mintal.

A chronicler for the 24th Division wrote:

The soldiers of the 24th Infantry, considered the post-Davao operations to be the hardest, bitterest and, most exhausting battle of the ten island campaigns. In addition to the tenacious defense put up by the Japanese, another punishing aspect of the subsequent combat was the proliferous fields of abaca. To the foot soldiers fighting in the Davao province, the word abaca was synonymous with hell...Countless acres around Davao are covered with these thick-stemmed plants, fifteen to twenty feet high; the plants grow as closely together as sugar cane, and their long, lush, green leaves are in a welter of green so dense that a strong man must fight with the whole weight of his body for each foot of progress...In the abaca fields, visibility was rarely more than ten feet. No breeze ever reached through the gloomy expanse of green, and more men—American, Filipino and Japanese—fell prostrate from the overpowering heat than bullets. The common way for scouts to locate an enemy position in abaca fighting was to advance until they received machinegun fire at a range of three to five yards. For the next two months, in such an environment, the 24th Division fought the Japanese. While the infantry sought out the Japanese defenses, platoons and squads worked through the abaca and surrounding jungle to seek out enemy bunkers and spider holes.

In this way, fighting progressed slowly, but the Americans and Filipinos were making headway. At Libby Airdrome and the village of Mintal, some 5 mi (8.0 km) west of Davao City, the 21st Infantry Regiment got assailed from three sides in a concentrated attack by a numerically stronger enemy.

Individual acts of heroism often spelled the difference between victory and defeat in the desperate fighting. On 14 May, posthumous Medal of Honor awardee, Pfc. James Diamond of D Company fell mortally wounded as he was leading a patrol to evacuate more casualties when came under heavy attack. He drew enemy fire while sprinting to an abandoned machine gun and was caught in a hail of bullets, but he allowed his patrol to reach safety. The regiment then have to withdraw and regroup with the 24th Division near Toril, at the city's southern part, to prepare for a renewed assault.

On 17 May, after being exhausted and bloodied during the fighting in Mintal village, the 24th Division, with fresh reinforcements, renewed its offensive, with the 21st and 34th Infantry Regiments attacking against the Japanese center, the 34th east of the Talomo river and the 21st west. At the same time, the 19th Infantry Regiment, supported by the guerrilla 107th Division, attacked northwards from the city center. On 28 May, the 34th Infantry contacted the 21st Infantry east of Tugbok, west from the city center.

=== Naval engagements in Davao Gulf ===
American warships sallied in Davao Gulf shortly before the battle began and during the battle after they have landed their troops ashore. While the battle is raging in the city, however, there came another problem from the sea. By the time the battle began, Japanese suicide boats began harassing American shipping in the area, operating from their base at Piso Point, currently part of Banaybanay town which is located at the eastern shore of the gulf. Piso Point is strategically located at the south with many overhanging trees which allows the Japanese to initiate camouflage attacks against the Allies. As part of the battle the Americans, while engaging in Davao City and its vicinity, were also given the mission to eradicate Japanese troops situated at the western portion of the gulf.

On May 10, Edgar D. Hoagland, the naval commander of the 24th Division, was given a special task to survey the area for potential Japanese enemies hiding at the areas north of the city including Piso Point. Although he did not witness any suspicious acts at first, he continued to patrol at the north leaving behind his commandeer LCI vessel. The LCI vessel was abruptly attacked by Japanese suicide boats. No one could trace the whereabouts of the Japanese suicide boats since these boats remained under camouflage with the aid of numerous overhanging trees and maze inlets.

The same day an anonymous tip from the provincial guerrillas brought him together with his patrol torpedo boats at Piso Point once more. There, they have discovered that the Japanese have mastered the art of camouflage so well that they hid their suicide boats under mangroves with green, freshly cut palm leaves that enable them to be unseen at a distance greater than 100 yards. Credits are given to Marine Major Richard E. Maulsby, pilot of a Marine Mitchell bomber and Marine First Lieutenant Doit L. Fish for discovering the hidden Japanese suicide boats.

On May 14, Hoagland, together with ensign John Adams, USNR and their patrol torpedo boats, approached the point to exterminate the remaining Japanese troops with their suicide boats. Since they were all suicide boats, all Japanese were killed during the ensuing engagement and no prisoners were taken. Hoagland then ordered his forces to burn their remaining equipment.

=== Closing the battle ===
On 29 May, the 19th Infantry started from the coast north of the city and, with Wendell Fertig's Filipino guerrilla units coming from the west of the city, blew open the Japanese eastern flanks situated west from the city center, capturing the villages of Tacunan, Ula, Matina Biao, Magtuod, and attacking towards Mandug. The fighting later claimed the life of the 19th Infantry's commander, Col. Thomas "Jack" Clifford. The 34th Infantry attacked Harada's second line of defense on 30 May, and the capture of Mandug on 9 June, marked the collapse of the 100th Division. The 21 Infantry took Wangan on the same day. On 10 June, the beaten Japanese 100th Division withdrew into the mountains of Bukidnon.

Devastating American firepower proved crucial during the battle. With the Allied navy controlling Davao Gulf and the Filipinos at the city's surroundings, the rest of Davao City is now encircled at all sides by the Allies. With most of the city including the whole of the city proper now under Allied control, most Japanese units west of the city are now isolated, and Allied troops are now commencing mop-up operations in several sectors in the city and the province. Piecemeal resistance in then Sitio Ising, Municipality of Panabo (now Barangay Ising, Carmen) in Davao del Norte were among the last, and the bloodiest, in the Philippine islands during the liberation campaign before all of them were eventually quelled by the Allies at the end of the war. Battle of Ising is the only battle in the entire Philippines that Filipinos won against the Japanese invaders.

== Aftermath ==
The seizure of Davao was as decisive for the 24th Division as the Kabacan road junction capture was for the X Corps. Allied forces continued the liberation campaign in Mindanao, which ended shortly before the war.

After the battle and the war the Japanese, who formed the overwhelming majority in Davao City, stayed for the time being in the city. While some are forcibly expelled back to Japan due to enmity after the war, others were incorporated to the local Filipino population.

== Casualties ==
The fighting around the fringes of Davao City from late April to mid-June, cost the 24th Infantry Division some 350 dead and 1,615 wounded while the Japanese 100th Division suffered about 4,500 killed and 30 captured. Many more from both sides suffered horrendous losses during the vicious fighting elsewhere in the province. By the time it left the city, the Japanese 100th Division is left nearly destroyed from the fighting. The Battle of Ising Memorial Shrine situated in Barangay Ising, Carmen, Davao del Norte was built in commemoration and tribute to the belligerents' respective fallen soldiers in the battle.
