= Moros during World War II =

Participation of Moro Muslims in World War II

Moro resistance during World War II
- Part of the Philippine resistance against Japan in World War II
Date	May 1942-September 2, 1945
Location	Mindanao, Philippines
Result	Moro-Allied victory: Sulu and interior Mindanao mostly cleared of Japanese forces prior to arrival of American forces
Territorial changes	Japan loses control of the Muslim areas of Mindanao to Moro guerrilla fighters

Belligerents
Moro Juramentados Commonwealth of the Philippines United States	Japan Second Philippine Republic

Commanders and leaders
Salipada Pendatun; Busran Kalaw; Gumbay Piang; Alauya Alonto	Masaharu Homma; Shizuichi Tanaka

Units involved
Philippine Commonwealth Army: Moro-Bolo Battalion; Maranao Militia	Imperial Japanese Army

Strength
Moro-Bolo Battalion: 20,000 Alonto’s forces: 10,000	Imperial Japanese Army: Unknown

Casualties and losses
Total: unknown	Total: unknown In Jolo: 97% of occupying troops killed In Cotabato and Maguindanao (during the Allied Invasion): ~250 killed
- Note: Datu Busran Kalaw fought the Filipinos and Americans alongside fighting Japanese forces

The Tausug Moros lived in the Sulu archipelago, which was traditionally ruled by the Sulu Sultanate. The Maguindanaon Moros lived on Mindanao, which was traditionally ruled by the Maguindanao Sultanate. The Maranao Moros lived around Lake Lanao, which was traditionally ruled by the Confederation of Sultanates in Lanao (Pat a Pangampong a Ranao). They were invaded by the Americans during the Moro Rebellion and annexed into the Philippines. Among the anti-Japanese resistance the Tausug leader was Sulu Sultan Jainal Abirin II and the Chinese-Maguindanaon leader Datu Gumbay Pia. A few of the Maranao leaders were Datu Busran Kalaw, Salipada Pendatun, Sultan Alonto, and Sultan Dimaporo. Salipada Pendatun's brother-in-law, Major Datu Udtug, also fought against the Japanese, and in Cotabato, the focal area of the anti-Japanese resistance was Papalungan.

The Moro juramentados performed suicide attacks against Japanese troops, as they had against the Spaniards and Americans. An American prisoner-of-war, Herbert Zincke, recalled in his secret diary that the Japanese guarding him and other prisoners were scared of the Moro warriors and tried to keep as far away from them as possible to avoid getting attacked. US First Lieutenant Mel Amler recalled that some of the Moros would sometimes attack and stab Japanese, Filipino, and Americans and fight all of them at once. Neither the Moros nor the Japanese respected the Geneva Convention in regards to not attacking medics, the Moros out of ignorance and the Japanese since they had not signed the treaty. US General Robert L. Eichelberger saw a Japanese soldier who was captured by the Moros and feared being tortured at their hands, and he wanted Eichelberger to kill him to stop that from happening. A US prisoner-of-war, Victor L. Mapes, saw Japanese troops getting ambushed and slaughtered by Moro fighters with kris blades. In hand-to-hand fighting, some Moros deliberately pushed their own shoulders onto the Japanese bayonets to make it stay in place while they killed a Japanese soldier by using a bayonet or bolo with their other hand.

Bladed weapons like the spear, tabar, campilan, barong, and kris were used by the Moro Lanao against the Japanese, according to Sa Ramain, to compensate for their lack of guns.

Anti-Japanese Moro units like the Maranao Militia were led by Salipada Pendatun. Another anti-Japanese Moro unit, the Moro-Bolo Battalion was led by Datu Gumbay Piang and had about 20,000 men. Gumbay Piang's Cotabato Moros used Bolo knives to fight the Japanese, and swore that they would "fight to the last". An oath was sworn by Alauya Alonto, the Sultan of Ramain, and 10,000 other Moros in Lanao that they would fight to drive the Japanese out, and they sent a message that said, "We have prepared our bladed weapons because we lack firearms, and with sharp kris, barong, campilan, tabas and spear we will attack or defend as ordered." "and no mercy asked." Alonto said that "all fighting men of Lanao would like to sign their names, but they are too many." They promised to fight to the death against the Japanese and "swore upon the Koran". The Japanese demanded all natives in the Philippines to hand over anything that was a weapon or could be used as one, including Bolo knives. The order may have been because of the Moro pledge to fight the Japanese since the Moros were skilled with bladed weapons. US Captain Edward Kraus recommended Moro fighters for a suggested plan to capture an airbase in Lake Lanao for eventually driving the Japanese occupiers from the Philippines.

The Moro Datu Pino sliced the ears of Japanese and cashed them in with the US guerilla leader Colonel Wendell Fertig at the exchange rate of a pair of ears for one bullet and 20 centavos.

The Moro Maranao Datu Busran Kalaw was xenophobic toward all foreigners, and "fought both the Americans and the Japanese." Japanese Major Hiramatsu, a propaganda officer, tried to convince Kalaw that Japan was bombing the American mainland. The Japanese tried to convince Kalaw to join their side as "brother Orientals." Kalaw sent a response, which goaded Major Hiramatsu into sending a force of Japanese soldiers to attack him. Kalaw butchered it completely with no survivors. Kalaw's response also said, "Our ambushes will at least teach you respect for the Moros." Amer Manalao Mindalano, Datu Busran Kalaw, and Sultan Mohamad Ali Dimaporo were all Maranao Moro Muslim guerilla leaders who fought against the Japanese. Mohamad AH Dimaporo, Domocao Alonto, and Busran Kalaw commanded the largest resistance forces in the region. As a famous guerilla leader whose assaults were a "thorn in the side of the Japanese," Kalaw's anti-Japanese speech in Tamparan, which galvanized the people there in the struggle. Kalaw objected to the decision to surrender to the Japanese by US General Guy O. Fort, the commander of the USAFFE forces in Lanao in 1942. After the USAFFE had surrendered, Kalaw and other Maranao Moro leaders like Naguib Juanday, Manalao Mindalano and others organized their own resistance movements to fight the Japanese. Kalaw claimed that after the USAFFE surrender to the Japanese, General Guy Fort had let the Maranaos claim the USAFFE rifles. In the anti-Japanese resistance, the "strong leaders" had Kalaw among their number.

The Maranao Moros fought the Japanese 108th Division almost every week from 1943 to October 1944 in Lanao (southern Mindanao), and 130 Japanese troops were slaughtered at towns around Lake Lanao on September 12, 1942. That led the Japanese to avoid the area, which freed Manalao Mindalano and Busran Kalaw's Maranao forces to fight the Japanese in the coastal northern region.

The Cotabato and Lanao based anti-Japanese Maranao Muslim guerilla leaders included "Manalao Mindalano, Busran Kalaw of Momungan, Datu Laguindas of Ganasi, Joseph Sanguilla of Mumay and Madalum and Datu Buntalis of Masiu." Busran Kalaw had berny a teacher before the war and he became a major in the MMF anti-Japanese guerilla force. Kalaw had also been the town of Momungan's municipal treasurer. The resistance leader Kalaw's wife was a Christian Visayan, and he was a Muslim Maranao. The Pangampong also provided other Datus and Sultans, who commanded along with Busran Kalaw's resistance forces.

Japanese Captain Taka Ichi was goaded by the Moro Datu Lacub and Datu Dimala-ang of Basak into attacking them, and the Datus slaughtered all of the 125 Japanese soldiers.

Davao, in Mindanao, had a large population of Japanese immigrants who acted as a fifth column by welcoming the Japanese invaders during the war. The Japanese were hated by the Moros and disliked by the Chinese. The Moros were judged as "fully capable of dealing with Japanese fifth columnists and invaders alike." The Moros were to fight the Japanese invaders when they landed at Davao on Mindanao. The Japanese went back to their ships at night to sleep since the Moros struck so much fear into them even though the Moro were outnumbered by the Japanese.

It was reported that most of Mindanao was dominated by Moro, Filipino, and American guerilla forces during the Japanese occupation. The Moros had cleared the Japanese from the Muslim areas of Mindanao six months before the Americans returned to liberate the Philippines at the Battle of Leyte. The Moros then joined in on the battle to liberate the rest of Mindanao from the Japanese in 1945. The Moro Muslims had nearly exterminated the occupying Japanese soldiers in Sulu before the Americans returned, and the Japanese were constantly attacked by Muslim guerillas.

97% of the Japanese soldiers occupying Jolo were slaughtered by Moro Muslim Tausug guerrillas according to Japanese soldier Fujioka Akiyoshi, who was one of the few who remained alive by the end of the war. Fujioka described the Moros as brutal and recalled how the Moros sliced the livers and gold teeth off Japanese soldiers and in one month slaughtered 1,000 Japanese soldiers after they came to the island. Fujioka and his fellow Japanese soldiers were overjoyed when they finally reached an American base to surrender to since they knew their only other fate was being butchered by Moro Muslims or starvation. Injured Japanese were slaughtered by Moros with their kris daggers as the Moros constantly attacked and charged and butchered Japanese soldiers.

Nur Misuari's Moro National Liberation Front faction stated that the Japanese "exhibited tyranny, cruelty and inhumanity at its lowest level" and "had to suffer their worst defeat and highest death mortality at the hands of the Bangsamoro freedom fighters." It wrote that compared to the Japanese casualty rate in the Visayas and Luzon, the number of Japanese imperialists slaughtered by the Moro freedom fighters was greater by the thousands and that there was no capitulation like the fall of Bataan to the Japanese by the Moros although the Luzon Filipinos has surrendered. The MNLF said that the Japanese, American, and Spanish cruelty has been continued by Filipino rule.

A Muslim cleric from the Sulu in the Philippines, Imam Marajukim, helped supply Chinese and Suluk Muslim guerillas under Albert Kwok on British Borneo who were fighting the Japanese. Suluks were described as "strongly disposed to be anti-Japanese." Imam Marajukim helped the Chinese secure the indigenous participation in the uprising by Panglima Ali's Suluks, the Mantanni and Danawan (Dinawan) Islands Binadan inhabitants, and Oudar Islanders under Orang Tuah Arshad.

The Imperial Japanese Navy medic Akira Makino revealed that while he was stationed on Mindanao, at Zamboanga, from December 1944 to February 1945, he and other Japanese troops in Unit 731 had killed Moro Muslim prisoners by beheading or performed vivisections on them by cutting them open while they were alive to study their internal organs, and the Japanese had also forced the Moros to dig their own graves.

Some of the weapons that were used by the Moros against the Japanese were reused by the Moro insurgency in the Philippines.

American and Filipino refugees were lured into apparent safety offered by the Maranao Moros, only to be killed by the Moros. Throughout the war, the trails in the area remained littered with "hundreds of weather-whitened skeletons.

Haggarty estimates the amount rifles the Moro guerrillas have dug up or confiscated from slain Japanese and American soldiers numbered as high as 12,000 το 15,000.

When USAFFE forces and the dissolution of the Philippine Constabulary whose main mission in the Island of Mindanao was to "contain the Moros" had surrendered, The Moros began slaughtering christian residents, Moros reportedly shot or hacked "every man, woman and child they could find," leaving hundreds dead or wounded. The Lowland Christians plowed their fields with bolos at their belts, and formed their own vigilante groups before wiping out Moro villages in Retaliation. Christians buried Moros alive, and Moros retaliated by burying Christians alive in privies.

In some cases, Japanese soldiers would reportedly pay 2,000 pesos to Moro guerrillas in exchange for the heads of Australian or American soldiers.

== See also ==
- Moro insurgency in the Philippines
- Moro Rebellion
- Spanish–Moro Wars
