= Fourteenth Area Army =

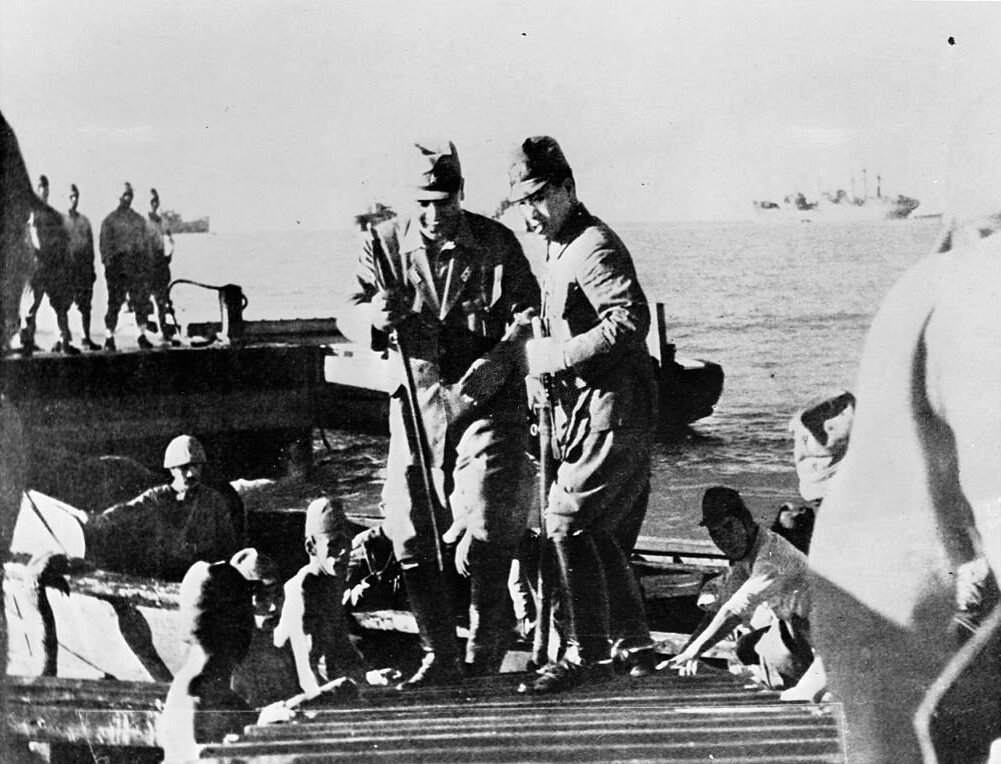
- General Homma comes ashore at Lingayen Gulf
- Active: November 6, 1941 – August 15, 1945
- Country: Empire of Japan
- Branch: Imperial Japanese Army
- Type: Infantry
- Role: Field Army
- Garrison/HQ: Manila
- Nickname(s): 尚武 (shōbu = "militarism" or "warlike spirit", also a synonym for "victory")
- Engagements: Battle of the Philippines (1941–42); Philippines campaign (1944–45)

The Fourteenth Area Army (第14方面軍, Dai-jyūyon hōmen gun) was a field army of the Imperial Japanese Army (IJA) during World War II. It was originally the 14th Army, formed on November 6, 1941, for the upcoming invasion of the Philippines. It was reorganized in the Philippines on July 28, 1944, when American landings were considered imminent. The Fourteenth Area Army was formed by reinforcing and renaming the Fourteenth Army (第14軍, Dai-jyūyon gun). (An IJA "area army" was equivalent to a field army in other militaries, while an IJA "army" was a smaller, corps-level formation.)

== History ==
The Japanese 14th Army was formed on November 6, 1941, under the Southern Expeditionary Army Group for the specific task of invading and occupying the Philippines. It initially consisted of the IJA 16th Division, 48th Division, 56th Division, and 65th Independent Mixed Infantry Brigade. In January 1942, the 48th Division was detached and reassigned to the Japanese Sixteenth Army for the invasion of the Netherlands East Indies, and was replaced with the Fourth Division. As the army was still fighting in the Philippines, its commanding officer, Lieutenant General Masaharu Homma, requested more reinforcements. The 10th Independent Garrison was sent to the Philippines as was the 21st Division Infantry Group, and the First Field Artillery Headquarters to command the field artillery units. The Fourth and Seventh Tank Regiments were part of the 14th Army, as well as the First, Eighth, and 16th Field Artillery Regiments and the 9th Independent Field Artillery Battalion. This army was responsible for the Bataan Death March after the surrender of US and Filipino forces in Bataan, and the 65th Independent Brigade was also accused of the Mariveles Massacre.

The 14th Army came under the direct control of Imperial General Headquarters in June, 1942; however, the Southern Expeditionary Army Group in Saigon continued to issue orders, at times in conflict with those received from Tokyo, and the 14th's commanding officer was plagued by insubordination from junior officers who used the situation to issue orders without his approval, or to countermand orders with which they did not agree. In August 1942, Homma was replaced by Lieutenant General Shizuichi Tanaka.

In July 1942 the 4th Division came under control of the 14th Army, as did the 30th Division, which was assigned to the defense of Mindanao. As the war situation continued to deteriorate for Japan, and Allied forces prepared to invade the Philippines, the 14th Army restructured its independent infantry brigades and reserves to form the new 100th, 102nd, 103rd, and 105th Divisions.

In March 1944 the 14th Army officially reverted to the control of the Southern Expeditionary Army Group. On July 28, 1944, the Japanese 14th Army officially became the Japanese 14th Area Army. Two more divisions (the 8th Division and the 10th Division) arrived in August 1944 as reinforcements, and also in August the 35th Army came under its control. On October 10, 1944, General Tomoyuki Yamashita assumed the command of the 14th Area Army to defend the Philippines. In the various battles of the Philippines campaign (1944–45) against combined American and Philippine Commonwealth armed forces in Leyte, Mindanao and parts of Luzon, the Japanese 14th Area Army suffered over 350,000 casualties, including virtually all of the 18,000 men of the 16th Infantry Division in the Battle of Leyte.

Troops of the 14th Area Army were responsible for the Palawan Massacre of December 14, 1944.

== List of commanders ==
=== Commanding officer ===
	Name	From	To
1	Lieutenant General Masaharu Homma	6 November 1941	1 August 1942
2	Lieutenant General Shizuichi Tanaka	1 August 1942	19 May 1943
3	Lieutenant General Shigenori Kuroda	19 May 1943	26 September 1944
4	General Tomoyuki Yamashita	26 September 1944	15 August 1945

=== Chief of staff ===
	Name	From	To
1	Lieutenant General Masami Maeda	6 November 1941	20 February 1942
2	Major General Takaji Wachi	20 February 1942	22 March 1944
3	Lieutenant General Haruki Isayama	22 March 1944	19 June 1944
4	Lieutenant General Tsuchio Yamaguchi	19 June 1944	28 July 1944
5	Major General Ryozo Sakuma	28 July 1944	5 October 1944
6	Lieutenant General Akira Mutō	5 October 1944	15 August 1945

== Structure ==
- Japanese 14th Area Army (1945)
  - 1st Infantry Division
  - 10th Infantry Division
  - 19th Infantry Division
  - 23rd Infantry Division
  - 26th Infantry Division
  - 103rd Infantry Division
  - 105th Infantry Division
  - 2nd Tank Division
  - 4th Air Division
  - IJA 1st Special Forces Division
  - 68th Independent Infantry Brigade
  - 55th Independent Mixed Brigade
  - 58th Independent Mixed Brigade
- Japanese 35th Army
  - 16th Infantry Division
  - 30th Infantry Division
  - 100th Infantry Division
  - 102nd Infantry Division
  - 54th Independent Mixed Brigade
- Japanese 41st Army
  - 8th Infantry Division
  - 39th Independent Mixed Brigade
  - 65th Independent Infantry Brigade
  - 9th Artillery Headquarters
