= USS LST-38 =

1943 LST-1-class tank landing ship

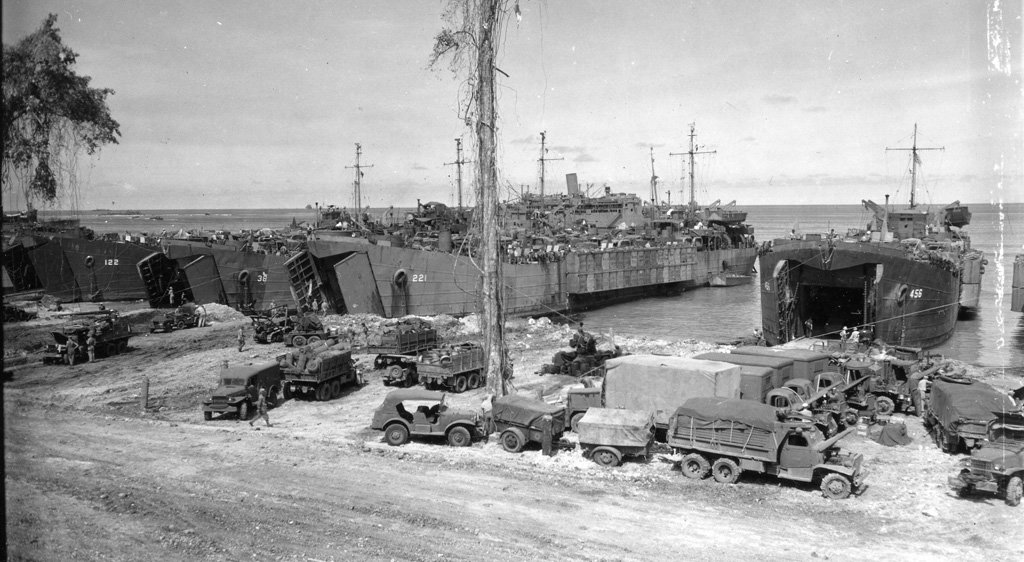
- Left to Right; LST-122, LST-38, LST-221 and LST-456 beached at Finschhaven, New Guinea, April 1944.

History

United States
- Name: LST-38
- Builder: Dravo Corporation, Pittsburgh, Pennsylvania
- Laid down: 12 May 1943
- Launched: 27 July 1943
- Commissioned: 3 September 1943
- Decommissioned: 26 March 1946
- Reclassified: Tank Landing Ship (Hospital), 15 September 1945
- Stricken: 1 May 1946
- Identification: Hull symbol: LST-38; Hull symbol: LST(H)-38; Code letters: NGTC
- Honors and awards: 4 × battle stars
- Fate: Sold for scrapping, 5 December 1947

General characteristics
- Type: LST-1-class tank landing ship
- Displacement: 4,080 long tons (4,145 t) full load; 2,160 long tons (2,190 t) landing
- Length: 328 ft (100 m) oa
- Beam: 50 ft (15 m)
- Draft: Full load: 8 ft 2 in (2.49 m) forward; 14 ft 1 in (4.29 m) aft; Landing at 2,160 t: 3 ft 11 in (1.19 m) forward; 9 ft 10 in (3.00 m) aft
- Installed power: 2 × 900 hp (670 kW) Electro-Motive Diesel 12-567A diesel engines; 1,700 shp (1,300 kW)
- Propulsion: 1 × Falk main reduction gears; 2 × Propellers
- Speed: 12 kn (22 km/h; 14 mph)
- Range: 24,000 nmi (44,000 km; 28,000 mi) at 9 kn (17 km/h; 10 mph) while displacing 3,960 long tons (4,024 t)
- Boats & landing craft carried: 2 or 6 x LCVPs
- Capacity: 2,100 tons oceangoing maximum; 350 tons main deckload
- Troops: 16 officers, 147 enlisted men
- Complement: 13 officers, 104 enlisted men
- Armament: Varied, ultimate armament; 2 × twin 40 mm (1.57 in) Bofors guns; 4 × single 40 mm Bofors guns; 12 × 20 mm (0.79 in) Oerlikon cannons

Service record
- Part of: LST Flotilla 13
- Operations: Marshall Islands operations; Occupation of Kwajalein and Majuro Atolls (31 January–6 February 1944); Bismarck Archipelago operations; Admiralty Islands landings (28 March–1 April 1944); Hollandia operation (21–27 April 1944); Assault and occupation of Guam (21–25 July 1944)
- Awards: American Campaign Medal; Asiatic–Pacific Campaign Medal; World War II Victory Medal; Navy Occupation Service Medal w/Asia Clasp

USS LST-38 was a United States Navy LST-1-class tank landing ship used exclusively in the Asiatic-Pacific Theater during World War II. Like many of her class, she was not named and is properly referred to by her hull designation.

== Construction ==
LST-38 was laid down on 14 April 1943, at Pittsburgh, Pennsylvania by the Dravo Corporation; launched on 27 July 1943; sponsored by Bertha Karpinski; and commissioned on 3 September 1943.

== Service history ==
During World War II, LST-38 was assigned to the Asiatic-Pacific theater. She took part in the Occupation of Kwajalein and Majuro Atolls in January and February 1944; the Admiralty Islands landings in March and April 1944, the Battle of Hollandia in April 1944; and the Battle of Guam in July 1944.

== Post-war decommissioning ==
Following the war, LST-38 was redesignated LST(H)-38 on 15 September 1945. She performed occupation duty in the Far East until mid-November 1945.

Upon her return to the United States, the ship was decommissioned on 26 March 1946 and struck from the Navy list on 1 May 1946. On 5 December 1947, she was sold to the Ships and Power Equipment Co., of Barber, New Jersey, and subsequently scrapped.

== Awards ==
LST-38 earned four battle stars for World War II service.

== See also ==
- Landing craft
- List of United States Navy LSTs

== Bibliography ==
- "LST-38". Dictionary of American Naval Fighting Ships. Naval History and Heritage Command. 30 July 2015. This article incorporates text from this source, which is in the public domain.
- "USS LST-38". NavSource. 13 October 2017.
