= Jiro Harada =

Japanese military officer

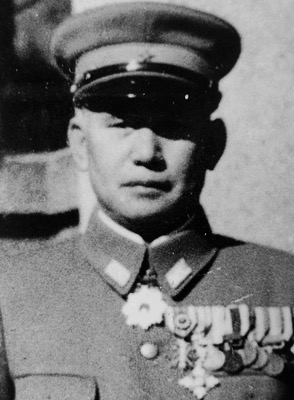
- Native name: 原田 治郎
- Born: November 10, 1894
- Died: December 20, 1989 (aged 95)
- Allegiance: Empire of Japan
- Branch: Imperial Japanese Army
- Rank: Lieutenant General
- Commands: IJA 100th Division
- Conflicts: World War II; Battle of Mindanao

Jiro Harada (原田 治郎, Harada Jirō; November 10, 1894 – December 20, 1989) was a lieutenant general in the Imperial Japanese Army during World War II.

He was the commander of the IJA 100th Division during the Battle of Mindanao, one of the strongest forces in the area. He was in charge of most of the defenses on the island, along with Lt. Gen. Gyosaku Morozumi and Rear Admiral Naoji Doi. Despite his bravery, Harada had to retreat, also refusing to defend the city of Davao. At Kibangay, the pursuit halted and Harada was able to stop the long and tiring retreat. He ordered his troops to disperse and forage in the mountains, effectively disbanding the 100th Division.

== Sources ==
- Books.google.com
- generals.dk
