= USS LST-936 =

1944 LST-542-class tank landing ship

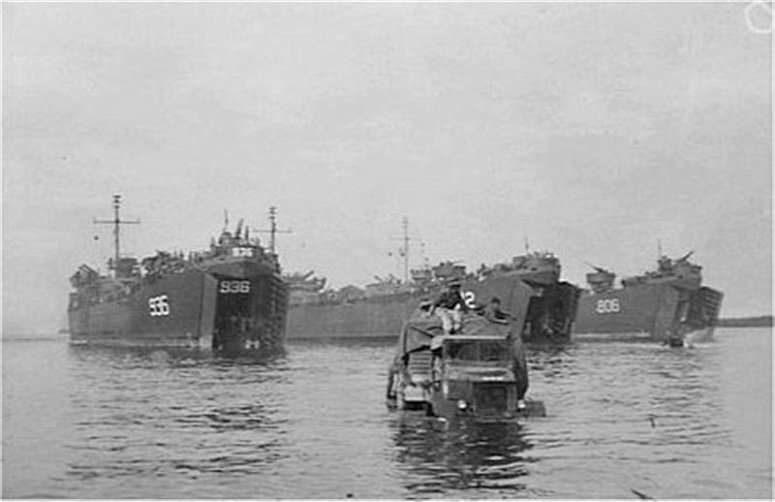
- USS LST-936, an unidentified LST and LST-806 beached at Labuan Island, Borneo, while offloading Royal Australian Air Force trucks, 11 June 1945.

History

United States
- Name: LST-936
- Builder: Bethlehem-Hingham Shipyard, Hingham, Massachusetts
- Yard number: 3406
- Laid down: 7 July 1944
- Launched: 9 August 1944
- Commissioned: 1 September 1944
- Decommissioned: 17 May 1946
- Stricken: 5 June 1946
- Identification: Hull symbol: LST-936; Code letters: NVPI
- Honors and awards: 1 × battle star
- Fate: Sold for scrapping, 12 June 1948

General characteristics
- Class & type: LST-542-class tank landing ship
- Displacement: 1,625 long tons (1,651 t) (light); 4,080 long tons (4,145 t) (full (seagoing draft with 1,675 short tons (1,520 t) load); 2,366 long tons (2,404 t) (beaching)
- Length: 328 ft (100 m) oa
- Beam: 50 ft (15 m)
- Draft: Unloaded: 2 ft 4 in (0.71 m) forward; 7 ft 6 in (2.29 m) aft; Full load: 8 ft 3 in (2.51 m) forward; 14 ft 1 in (4.29 m) aft; Landing with 500 short tons (450 t) load: 3 ft 11 in (1.19 m) forward; 9 ft 10 in (3.00 m) aft; Limiting 11 ft 2 in (3.40 m); Maximum navigation 14 ft 1 in (4.29 m)
- Installed power: 2 × 900 hp (670 kW) Electro-Motive Diesel 12-567A diesel engines; 1,800 shp (1,300 kW)
- Propulsion: 1 × Falk main reduction gears; 2 × Propellers
- Speed: 11.6 kn (21.5 km/h; 13.3 mph)
- Range: 24,000 nmi (44,000 km; 28,000 mi) at 9 kn (17 km/h; 10 mph) while displacing 3,960 long tons (4,024 t)
- Boats & landing craft carried: 2 x LCVPs
- Capacity: 1,600–1,900 short tons (3,200,000–3,800,000 lb; 1,500,000–1,700,000 kg) cargo depending on mission
- Troops: 16 officers, 147 enlisted men
- Complement: 13 officers, 104 enlisted men
- Armament: Varied, ultimate armament; 2 × twin 40 mm (1.57 in) Bofors guns; 4 × single 40 mm Bofors guns; 12 × 20 mm (0.79 in) Oerlikon cannons

Service record
- Operations: Mindanao Island landings (10–18 March, 24 March–14 April 17–23 April 1945)
- Awards: American Campaign Medal; Asiatic–Pacific Campaign Medal; World War II Victory Medal; Philippine Republic Presidential Unit Citation; Philippine Liberation Medal

USS LST-936 was an LST-542-class tank landing ship in the United States Navy. Like many of her class, she was not named and is properly referred to by her hull designation.

== Construction ==
LST-936 was laid down on 7 July 1944, at Hingham, Massachusetts, by the Bethlehem-Hingham Shipyard; launched on 9 August 1944; sponsored by Miss Dorothy M. Wadman; and commissioned on 1 September 1944.

== Service history ==
During World War II, LST-936 was assigned to the Asiatic-Pacific theater and participated in the Mindanao Island landings in March and April 1945.

Upon her return to the United States, she was decommissioned on 17 May 1946, and struck from the Navy list on 5 June, that same year. On 12 June 1948, the ship was sold to the Walter W. Johnson Co., for scrapping.

== Awards ==
LST-936 earned one battle star for World War II service.

== Bibliography ==
Online resources

- "LST-936". Dictionary of American Naval Fighting Ships. Naval History and Heritage Command. This article incorporates text from this source, which is in the public domain.
- "Bethlehem-Hingham, Hingham MA". www.ShipbuildingHistory.com. 11 August 2011.
- "USS LST-936". NavSource. 6 November 2015.
