= USS LST-456 =

WWII US naval ship

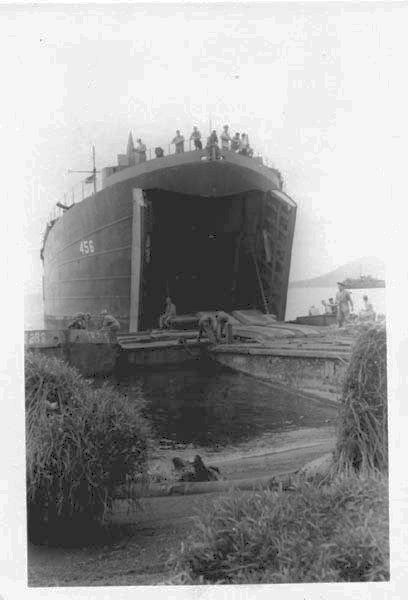
- USS LST-456, beached with bow doors open, South Pacific, c. 1943-1945.

History

United States
- Name: LST-456
- Ordered: as a Type S3-M-K2 hull, MCE hull 976
- Builder: Kaiser Shipbuilding Company, Vancouver, Washington
- Yard number: 160
- Laid down: 3 August 1942
- Launched: 20 October 1942
- Commissioned: 3 February 1943
- Decommissioned: 5 February 1946
- Stricken: 15 June 1973
- Identification: Hull symbol: LST-456; Code letters: NFJP
- Honors and awards: 8 × battle stars
- Fate: assigned to Commander Naval Forces Far East

Japan
- Operator: Shipping Control Authority for Japan
- In service: 5 February 1946
- Out of service: date unknown
- Renamed: Q043
- Fate: transferred to Military Sea Transportation Service (MSTS), 31 March 1952

United States
- Operator: MSTS
- Identification: Hull symbol: T-LST-456
- Fate: Sold, 27 September 1973

Iran
- Name: Karkas
- Operator: Maritime Co., Ltd., Khorramshahr, Iran
- Identification: Call sign: EPAM
- Fate: Sold, 1 February 1993

Bolivia
- Name: Bshair
- Operator: Al Jazya Mar. y Sh. Ag., United Arab Emirates
- Identification: IMO number: 7526364; Call sign: CPB020
- Fate: Deleted from Bolivian register

General characteristics
- Class & type: LST-1-class tank landing ship
- Displacement: 4,080 long tons (4,145 t) full load; 2,160 long tons (2,190 t) landing
- Length: 328 ft (100 m) oa
- Beam: 50 ft (15 m)
- Draft: Full load: 8 ft 2 in (2.49 m) forward; 14 ft 1 in (4.29 m) aft; Landing at 2,160 t: 3 ft 11 in (1.19 m) forward; 9 ft 10 in (3.00 m) aft
- Installed power: 2 × 900 hp (670 kW) Electro-Motive Diesel 12-567A diesel engines; 1,700 shp (1,300 kW)
- Propulsion: 1 × Falk main reduction gears; 2 × Propellers
- Speed: 12 kn (22 km/h; 14 mph)
- Range: 24,000 nmi (44,000 km; 28,000 mi) at 9 kn (17 km/h; 10 mph) while displacing 3,960 long tons (4,024 t)
- Boats & landing craft carried: 2 or 6 x LCVPs
- Capacity: 2,100 tons oceangoing maximum; 350 tons main deckload
- Troops: 16 officers, 147 enlisted men
- Complement: 13 officers, 104 enlisted men
- Armament: Varied, ultimate armament; 2 × twin 40 mm (1.57 in) Bofors guns; 4 × single 40 mm Bofors guns; 12 × 20 mm (0.79 in) Oerlikon cannons

Service record
- Operations: Eastern New Guinea operation; Lae occupation (4–8 and 14–17 September 1943); Saidor occupation (2–3 and 6–9 January and 12–14 February 1944); Bismarck Archipelago operation; Cape Gloucester, New Britain (26–28 December 1943 and 17–23 February and 25 February–1 March 1944); Admiralty Islands landings (4–8 and 11–15 March 1944); Aitape–Humboldt Bay–Tanahmerah Bay (21–25 April 1944); Western New Guinea operation; Toem-Wakde-Sarmi area operation (17–18 and 23–25 May 1944); Biak Islands operation (27–29 May and 31 May–4 June 1944); Cape Sansapor operation (30 July, 4 and 8–14 August 1944); Morotai landing (15 September 1944); Leyte landings (13–28 October 1944); Lingayen Gulf landings (4–18 January 1945); Mindanao Island landings (17–23 April 1945); Balikpapan operation (28 June–7 July 1945)
- Awards: Combat Action Ribbon; American Campaign Medal; Asiatic–Pacific Campaign Medal; World War II Victory Medal; Philippine Republic Presidential Unit Citation; Philippine Liberation Medal

USS LST-456 was a United States Navy LST-1-class tank landing ship used in the Asiatic-Pacific Theater during World War II.

== Construction ==
LST-456 was laid down on 3 August 1942, under Maritime Commission (MARCOM) contract, MC hull 976, by Kaiser Shipyards, Vancouver, Washington; launched on 20 October 1942; and commissioned on 3 February 1943.

== Service history ==
During the war, LST-456 was assigned to the Pacific Theater of Operations. She took part in the Eastern New Guinea operations, the Lae occupation in September 1943, and the Saidor occupation in January and February 1944; the Bismarck Archipelago operations, the Cape Gloucester, New Britain, landings from December 1943 through February 1944, and the Admiralty Islands landings in February and March 1944; the Hollandia operation in April 1944; the Western New Guinea operations, the Toem-Wakde-Sarmi area operation in May 1944, the Biak Islands operation in May and June 1944, the Cape Sansapor operation in July and August 1944, and the Morotai landing in September 1944; the Leyte landings in October 1944; the Lingayen Gulf landings in January 1945; the Mindanao Island landings in April 1945; and the Balikpapan operation in June and July 1945.

== Post-war service ==
Following the war, LST-456 performed occupation duty in the Far East until early February 1946. She served with the Military Sea Transportation Service (MSTS) as USNS T-LST-456 from 31 March 1952, until she was struck from the Navy list on 15 June 1973.

== Merchant service ==
On 27 September 1973, the ship was sold to the Maritime Co. Ltd., Khorramshahr, Iran, and renamed Karkas. On 1 February 1993, she was sold to Al Jazya Mar. y Sh. Ag., United Arab Emirates and renamed Bshair, and reflagged for Bolivia. She has since been deleted from the Bolivian ship register and her fate is unknown.

== Honors and awards ==
LST-456 earned eight battle stars for her World War II service.

== Notes ==
Citations

== Bibliography ==
Online resources

- "LST-456". Dictionary of American Naval Fighting Ships. Naval History and Heritage Command. This article incorporates text from this source, which is in the public domain.
- "Kaiser Vancouver, Vancouver WA". www.ShipbuildingHistory.com. 27 November 2010.
- "USS LST-456". NavSource. 31 October 2014.
