= Busran Kalaw =

Datu Busran Kalaw
- Died: Momongan, Lanao del Norte
- Military career
- Allegiance: United States; Philippines
- Branch: Philippine Commonwealth Army: Maranao Militia Force
- Service years: 1941–1945
- Rank: Major
- Unit: Maranao Bolo Battalion
- Commands: Maranao Militia Force
- Known for: Guerilla leader in Lanao
- Conflicts: Battle of Dansalan (1944); Battle of Tamparan (1942); Battle of Dansalan (1942)

Busran Kalaw, was a Moro guerilla leader in the Philippines during World War II. He was known for his fierce resistance against the Japanese occupation, particularly in the Lanao region of Mindanao. He is considered folk hero among Maranaos due to his ferocious battle and butchering the enemies. He is considered xenophobic towards foreigners having fought Spanish, Filipinos, Americans, and Japanese.

== Life ==
Kalaw is married to a Visayan Christian, he was a school teacher and served as municipal treasurer of Momongan, Lanao before the war.

He joined the USAFFE on the outset of the war and was assigned to command a Moro Bolo Battalion by General Guy O. Fort, commander of Lanao Sector. They fought the Kawaguchi Detachment in Dansalan, although battered and exhausted due to lack of weapons and firepower they were successful on delaying them with linking to Kawamura Detachment in Cagayan Sector. Fort's forces was still effectively fighting when ordered to surrender on May 12, 1942. He is one of the moro commanders objected to this order from General Fort. He refused to surrender and moved to the hills and organized his guerilla unit.

Before the surrender of USAFFE in Lanao area, General Fort allowed the surrendering soldiers' passed on their rifles and supplies to the guerillas. Kalaw organized the largest resistance movement against the Japanese in the area.

Kalaw's unit, along with other Moro units in Lanao under leaders like Mamalinta Lao, Manalao Mindalano, and Muhammad Ali Dimaporo, constitute the Maranao Militia Force. They constantly attacked Japanese troops, demonstrating their resistance. His forces, along with other Moro units, engaged in continuous harassment and ambushes against the Japanese Army.

He was approached and offered by the Japanese to work and side with them due to ethnic ties as oriental. Offer government positions but he refused and in response he attacked the enemy who sent large force to crush him and he continued his guerilla activities.

He aided the Americans who landed in Malabang to liberate Lanao and Mindanao. After the liberation he was active the recognition of Moro freedom fighters during the war.

== Legacy ==
Busran Kalaw Street, in Wao, Lanao Del Sur is named after him.

== See also ==
- Moros during World War II
- Philippine resistance against Japan
- 81st Division (Philippines)
- Guy O. Fort
- Battle of Tamparan
