= Naoji Doi =

Japanese rear admiral (1894–1963)

- 土井 直治
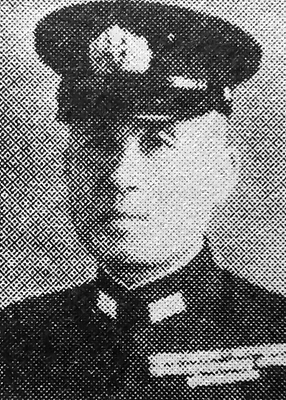
- Born: March 26, 1894; Kyoto, Japan
- Died: February 12, 1963 (aged 68); Fukuoka, Japan
- Education: Imperial Japanese Naval Academy
- Military career
- Allegiance: Empire of Japan
- Branch: Imperial Japanese Navy
- Service years: 1915–1945
- Rank: Rear admiral
- Units: Iwate, Ise, Izumo, Nachi, Sasebo Sailor Corps, Amoy Area Special Base Force, Toyokawa Navy Yard
- Commands: 15th Guard Unit; Rashin Area Special Base Force; 32nd Naval Special Base Force
- Conflicts: World War II; Battle of Mindanao

Naoji Doi (土井 直治, Doi Naoji; March 26, 1894 – February 12, 1963) was a rear admiral in the Imperial Japanese Navy during World War II.

== Career ==
Naoji Doi was a member of the 43rd Class of the Imperial Japanese Naval Academy, ranking 24 out of 95 Cadets. He commanded the 32nd Naval Special Base Force, a force of naval troops occupying the island of Mindanao during the course of World War II. When Lieutenant-General Gyosaku Morozumi left to command the IJA 35th Army, he left Naoji Doi to command his own force by himself. When the United States Marines landed on Mindanao, they were aided by the regular and constable troops of the Philippine Commonwealth Army and Philippine Constabulary and pushed the Japanese back to the northern end of the island. Naoji Doi and his troops fought until the end of the war on August 15.

== Assignments ==
- Crewmember, Iwate – 16 December 1915 – 22 August 1916
- Division Officer, Ise – 1 December 1921 – 1 December 1922
- Division Officer, Izumo – 1 December 1927 – 15 January 1928
- Equipping Officer, Nachi – 15 July 1928 – 10 September 1928
- Torpedo Officer, Nachi – 10 September 1928 – 1 December 1931
- Executive Officer, Sasebo Sailor Corps – 5 December 1938 – 15 October 1941
- Executive Officer, Amoy Area Special Base Force – 15 October 1941 – 15 January 1942
- Commanding Officer, 15th Guard Unit – 1 February 1942 – 20 August 1942
- Chief of Administration & Worker Training Bureaus, Toyokawa Navy Yard – 12 September 1942 – 5 May 1944
- Commanding Officer, Rashin Area Special Base Force – 25 June 1944 – 20 September 1944
- Commanding Officer, 32nd Special Base Force – 6 October 1944 – 15 August 1945

== Promotions ==
- Midshipman – 16 December 1915
- Ensign – 1 December 1916
- Sub-Lieutenant – 1 December 1918
- Lieutenant – 1 December 1921
- Lieutenant Commander – 1 December 1927
- Commander – 15 November 1933
- Captain – 15 November 1938
- Rear Admiral – 1 May 1944
