= 30th Division (Imperial Japanese Army) =

Infantry division from 1943 to 1945

- Active: 1943 - 1945
- Country: Empire of Japan
- Branch: Imperial Japanese Army
- Type: Infantry
- Role: reserve
- Garrison/HQ: Pyongyang
- Nickname: Panther Division
- Engagements: Battle of Leyte; Battle of Mindanao

Commanders
- Notable commanders: Gyosaku Morozumi

The 30th Division (第30師団, Dai-sanjū Shidan) was an infantry division in the Imperial Japanese Army. Its call sign was the Panther division (豹兵団, Hyō-heidan). The 30th Division was formed on 14 May 1943 as a triangular division in Pyongyang. The 30th division was not recruited but rather assembled from the infantry regiments detached from the other units.

== Action ==
The 30th division was initially based on the island of Mindanao in the Philippines, but with the start of the Battle of Leyte in 17 October 1944, it was sent to reinforce defensive positions in Leyte. Two battalions from the 41st Regiment of the 30th division landed on Leyte on 20 October 1944 and started fighting from 25 October 1944. Reinforcements (2 battalions) of about 2000 men also arrived on 26 October 1944 at Albuera, Leyte, unloading safely. 41st Infantry Regiment of the 30th division was ordered 26 October 1944 from Carigara to Jaro, which was under heavy US attack at the time. They did not make it in time, as Jaro defenses failed on 29 October 1944. By 9 November 1944, the 41st regiment has stalled 3.5 km northwest of Jaro town. Until 29 October 1944 Japanese had planned to leave only 3 battalions of the 30th division, but after heavy losses of the 26th division during landing in Ormoc the future reinforcements were held back. Nonaka Battalion of a 30th division was ordered to prepare emergency beach defences near Ipil, Ormoc, which was considered a rear area at the moment. The US forces landed in Ormoc on 7 December 1944, and Nonaka Battalion "fought bravely", in one case conducting a counter-landing from junks by a machine gun company and an infantry company. By the nightfall of 8 December 1944, the forces of the Nonaka Battalion were pushed from the beaches at all points, suffering heavy casualties in the process.

The remaining forces of the 30th division fought in the Battle of Mindanao. Initially stretched over the entire area of East Mindanao north of Davao City, the 30th division did not actively contest the loss of Zamboanga City on 10 March 1945 and subsequent US push eastward. This ultimately resulted in the isolation of the 100th division in Davao City on the south flank of the 30th division. The 1st battalion of the 74th infantry regiment belonging to the 30th division tried to stop the US wedge at the Kabacan road junction on 22 April 1945, but failed. Still overstretched, the 30th division established a roughly south-north line of defense Kabacan - Kibawe- Manolo Fortich - Macajalar Bay. Also, a separate unit of approximately 2200 men was placed on the beaches at Butuan Bay. The commander of the 30th division had severely under-estimated the handicaps to Japanese mobility due to Philippine guerillas and air raids. So the US attack against the southern end of the defensive line on 27 April 1945 was impossible to counter, as isolated Japanese units were overrun one after another in rapid sequence. On 3 May 1945 the US forces had reached Kibawe. The Japanese infantry battalion at Maramag was able to hold back the US attack 6–12 May 1945 in a rearguard action, while the rest of the 30th division was trying to assemble in Macajalar Bay area. This objective was achieved only partially, as US 108th Regiment had landed in Macajalar Bay unopposed on 10 May 1945, and proceeded 30 km inland until encountering a Japanese rearguard on 13 May 1945, and overrunning it by 18 May 1945. Another rearguard action happened in Malaybalay, where remnants of the 30th Field Artillery Regiment (left behind because it was deemed too heavy for escape to the mountains) were able to hold back the US forces from 20 May 1945 until the night of 21 May 1945.

The 30th division plans were to retreat to Waloe (now in Agusan Marsh Wildlife Sanctuary), but US troops had reached Waloe first, resulting in Japanese retreating to the west after a skirmish 27 June 1945.

Some detachments (approximately battalion-sized) of the 30th division guarding airfields of Sarangani Bay on the far south of the island were eliminated in July 1945.

The scattered Japanese forces largely survived in the mountains of Central Mindanao until the surrender of Japan on 15 August 1945.

== See also ==
- List of Japanese Infantry Divisions
- This article incorporates material from the Japanese Wikipedia page 第30師団 (日本軍), accessed 10 March 2016

== Reference and further reading ==
- Madej, W. Victor. Japanese Armed Forces Order of Battle, 1937-1945 [2 vols]

Allentown, PA: 1981
