= 103rd Division (Imperial Japanese Army) =

- 第103師団
- Active: 1944–1945
- Country: Empire of Japan
- Branch: Imperial Japanese Army
- Type: Infantry
- Size: 15500
- Garrison/HQ: Luzon
- Nickname: Steed division
- Engagements: Battle of Luzon

The 103rd Division (第103師団, Dai-hyakusan Shidan) was an infantry division of the Imperial Japanese Army. Its call sign was the Steed Division (駿兵団, Shun Heidan). The division was formed 15 June 1944 in Luzon. The nucleus of the formation was the 32nd Independent Mixed Brigade. The 103rd division was a Type C (hei) security division therefore the division backbone has comprised independent infantry battalions instead of infantry regiments.

== Action ==
Initially 103rd division was tasked with the garrisoning of north Luzon, with 79th infantry brigade covering north-west and 80th infantry brigade covering north-east quarter of the island.

During the Battle of Luzon since 9 January 1945, the 103rd division zone of responsibility was from Aparri to west. Soon the 103rd division has retreated to the mountains inland and largely survived around Magat River until surrender of Japan 15 August 1945.

== See also ==
- List of Japanese Infantry Divisions
- Independent Mixed Brigades (Imperial Japanese Army)

== Notes and references ==
- This article incorporates material from Japanese Wikipedia page 第103師団 (日本軍), accessed 26 June 2016
- Madej, W. Victor. Japanese Armed Forces Order of Battle, 1937–1945 [2 vols] Allentown, PA: 1981
