= Moros =

Greek mythological figure who personifies doom

In Greek mythology, Moros /ˈmɔːrɒs/ (Ancient Greek: Μόρος, romanized: Móros, lit. 'Doom') or Morus /ˈmɔːrəs/ is the personified spirit of impending doom, who drives mortals to their deadly fate. It was also said that Moros gave people the ability to foresee their death. His Roman equivalent was Fatum.

== Family ==
Moros is the offspring of Nyx, the primordial goddess of the night. It is suggested by Roman authors that Moros was son of Erebus, primordial god of darkness. However, in Hesiod's Theogony it is suggested that Nyx bore him by herself, along with several of her other children.

Regardless of the presence or absence of Moros' father, this would make him the brother of the Moirai, or the Fates. Among his other siblings are Thanatos and the Keres, death spirits who represented the physical aspects of death—Keres being the bringers of violent death and terminal sickness, while Thanatos represents a more peaceful passing.

== Mythology ==
In Prometheus Bound, the titular Titan suggests that he gave humanity the spirit Elpis, the personification of hope, in order to help them ignore the inevitability of Moros. He is also referred to as "the all-destroying god, who, even in the realm of Death, does not set his victim free," further supporting his image as representative of the inevitability of death and suffering.

=== Aeschylus' account ===
Aeschylus, Fragment 199 (from Plutarch, Life and Poety of Homer 157) (trans. Weir Smyth):

"A man dies not for the many wounds that pierce his breast, unless it be that life's end keep pace with death, nor by sitting on his hearth at home doth he the more escape his appointed doom (peprômenon moros)."

The word moros is not personified here but the passage provides a clear picture of the concept.

=== Christianity ===
Along with Thanatos, he is associated as the rider of the pale horse in the Apocalypse.
