= Battle of Tamparan =

- Part of the Philippine resistance against Japan / the Pacific Theater of World War II
Location	Tamparan, Lanao, Philippines
Result	Maranao victory

Belligerents
Maranao guerillas	Empire of Japan

Commanders and leaders
N/A	Atsuo Takeuchi

Units involved
N/A (irregulars)	Imperial Japanese Army

Strength
	90 soldiers

Casualties and losses
200–300 guerillas	85 soldiers

The Battle of Tamparan was a engagement between the Imperial Japanese Army and Maranao irregulars in Tamparan, Lanao, Philippines during the Japanese occupation era of World War II.

== Battle ==
Forces of the Imperial Japanese Army coming from Dansalan (modern-day Marawi) landed in a wharf at dawn in Tamparan on September 12, 1942 which was the first day of the month of Ramadan. They were pursuing Maranao guerrilla Busran Kalaw.

The 90 Japanese soldiers shelled Kota Dimalaang, a kota or fortification in the settlement, which was flying a red flag which alerted the locals. The Maranao civilians armed with panabas and other bladed weapons from the town and nearby Taraka, Maguing and Gata launched a counterattack.

The Japanese running out of ammunition fled towards the marshland near Lake Lanao and the Tamparan wharf with only five Japanese surviving. It was a Pyrrhic victory for the Maranaos who suffered 200–300 casualties.

Japan's official war history Senshi Sōsho in its Operation to conquer the Philippines (比島攻略作戦) and Navy Invasion Operations in the Philippines and Malaya Area (比島・マレー方面海軍進攻作戦) as part of its invasion series does not mention the Battle of Tamparan.

In the Battle of Tamparan, Muslim Moros massacred 85 Japanese out of a 90 strong unit using mainly swords against Japanese armed with rifles, which is testified to by Japanese survivors. The memoirs written by the Japanese survivors in the Tanaka battalion of the battle accuse the Muslims of being "unmanageble", violent, ferocious and fanatic and a Japanese officer Lt. Col. Tanaka Yoshinari said that they were "local natives yet uncivilized in the ways of the Empire" and the Japanese viewed the Muslims as "inferior" and "savages".

== Legacy ==
The Bangsamoro Commission for the Preservation of Cultural Heritage (BCPH) unveiled a marker on September 25, 2025 in Tamparan now under Lanao del Sur province to commemorate the Maranaos who were part of the historic battle.
