= Tabar (axe) =

Asian type of battle axe

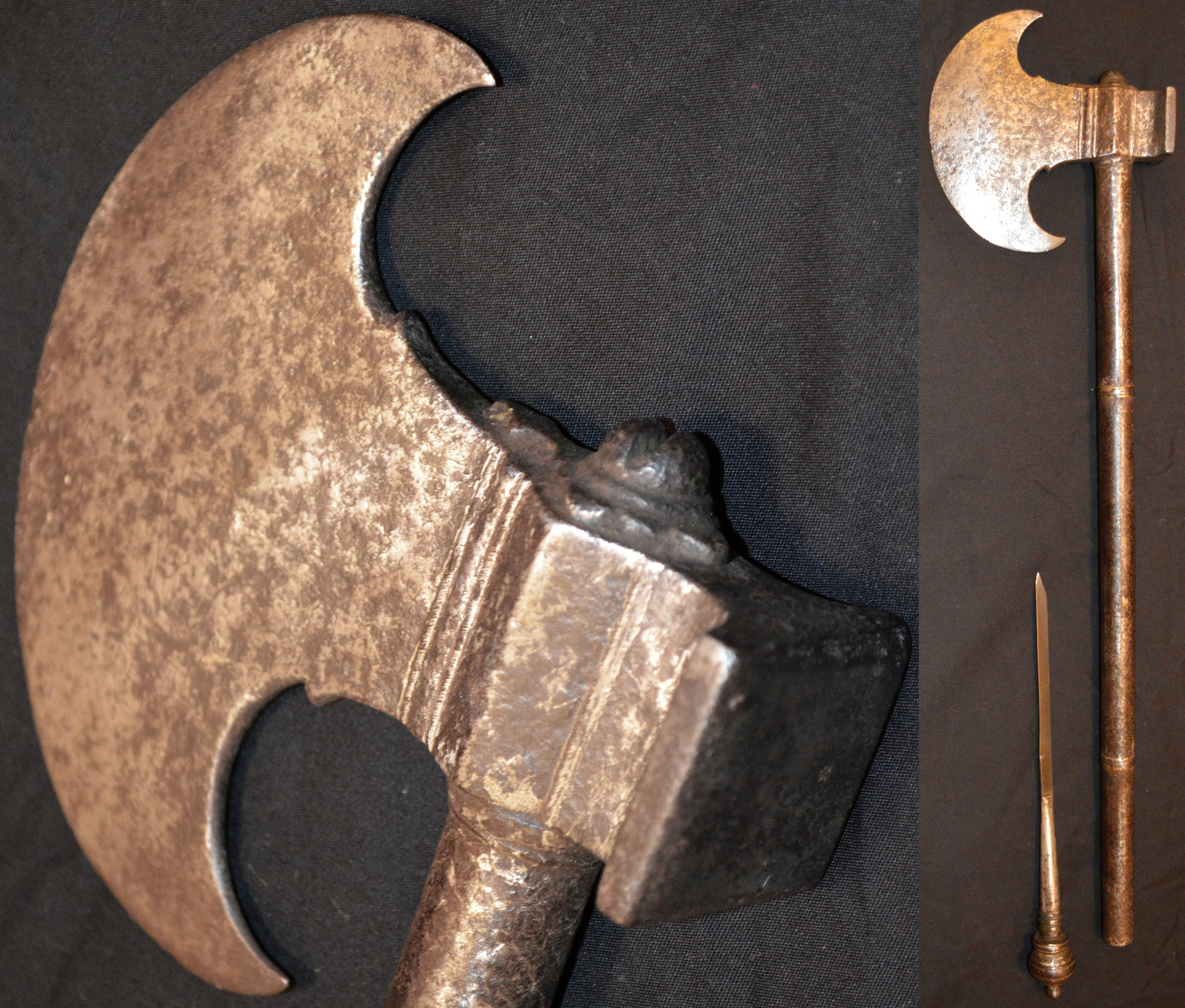
Indian (Sindh) tabar battle axe, late 18th century or earlier, crescent shape 5-inch-long head with a square hammer opposite of the blade, 22-inch-long steel haft, the end of the haft unscrews to reveal a 5-inch slim blade. Heavily patinated head and handle with traces of engraving.

The tabar (also called tabarzin, which means "saddle axe" [in persian], Persian: تبر) is a type of battle axe. The term tabar is used for axes originating from the Ottoman Empire, Persia, India and surrounding countries and cultures. the word tabar is also used in most Slavic languages as the word for axe (e.g. Russian: топор).

== Persia ==
The tabarzin (saddle axe) (Persian: تبرزین; sometimes translated "saddle-hatchet") is the traditional battle axe of Persia (Iran). It bears one or two crescent-shaped blades. The long form of the tabar was about seven feet long, while a shorter version was about three feet long. What makes the Persian axe unique is the very thin handle, which is very light and always metallic. The tabarzin was sometimes carried as a symbolic weapon by wandering dervishes (Muslim ascetic worshippers). The word tabar for axe was directly borrowed into Armenian as tapar (Armenian: տապար) from Middle Persian tabar, as well as into Proto-Slavic as "topor" (*toporъ), the latter word known to be taken through Scythian, and is still the common Slavic word for axe.

== India ==
During the 17th and 18th centuries, the tabar battle axe was a standard weapon of the mounted warriors of Sindh, Sindhi warriors carried single or double edged crescent shaped tabar axes locally called kuhari.

In Punjab Sikh Khalsa army and what is now modern day India and Pakistan. Made entirely of metal or with a wood haft, it had a strongly curved blade and a hammer-headed poll and was often decorated with scroll work. Sometimes a small knife was inserted in the tabar's hollow haft.

== Arabia ==
According to Adam Metz's "Islamic Civilization in the Fourth Century of the Hegira," the tabar was frequently not only a weapon used by police chiefs (Sahib al-Shurta), but also a mark of office for them.

== Gallery ==
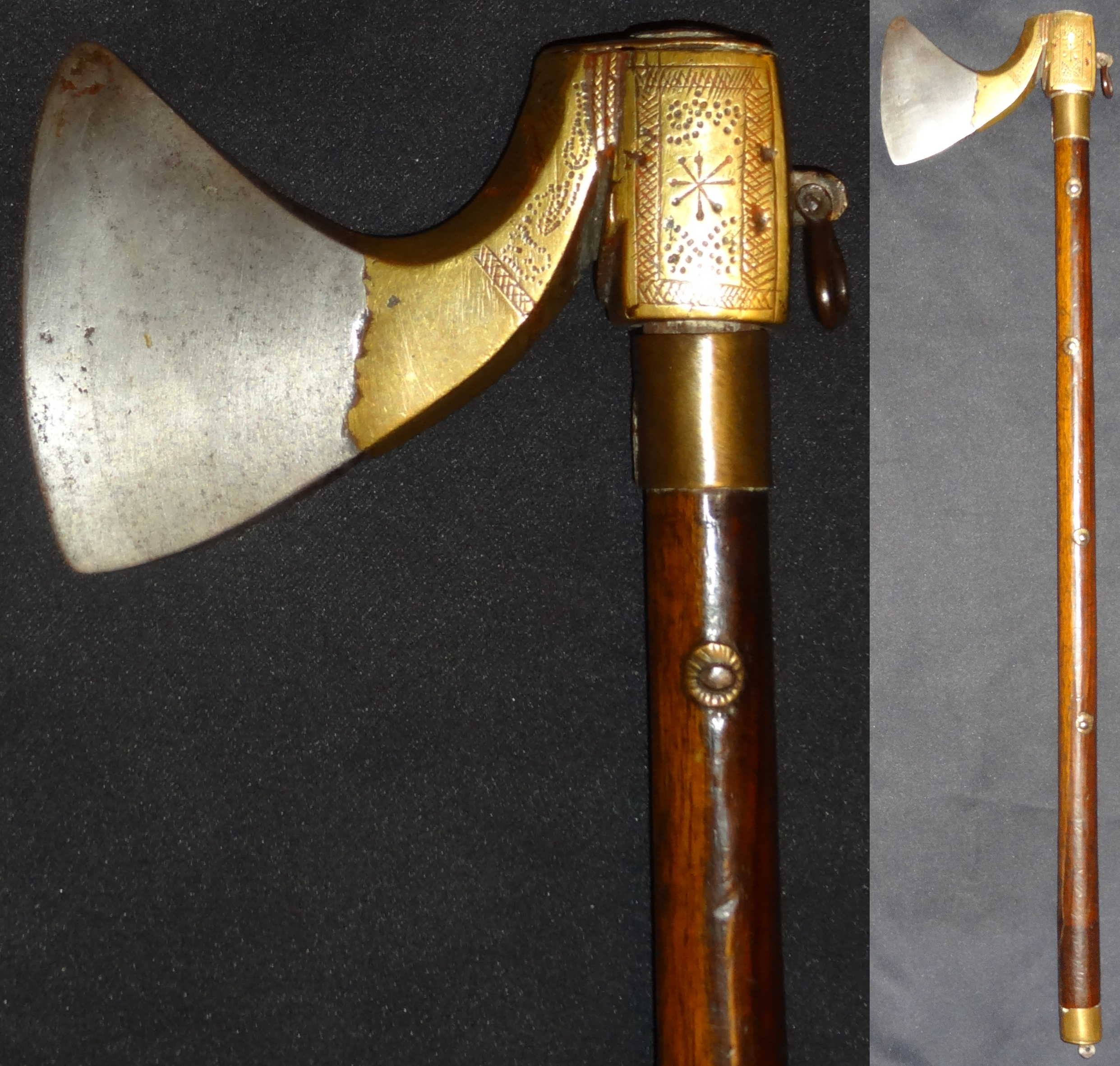
Indian (Southern) tabar (axe), 18th century, the wooden haft has a steel tang running 3/4 of the way down, pinned by four rivets. The axe head is brass with a forged steel blade, L. 58 cm.

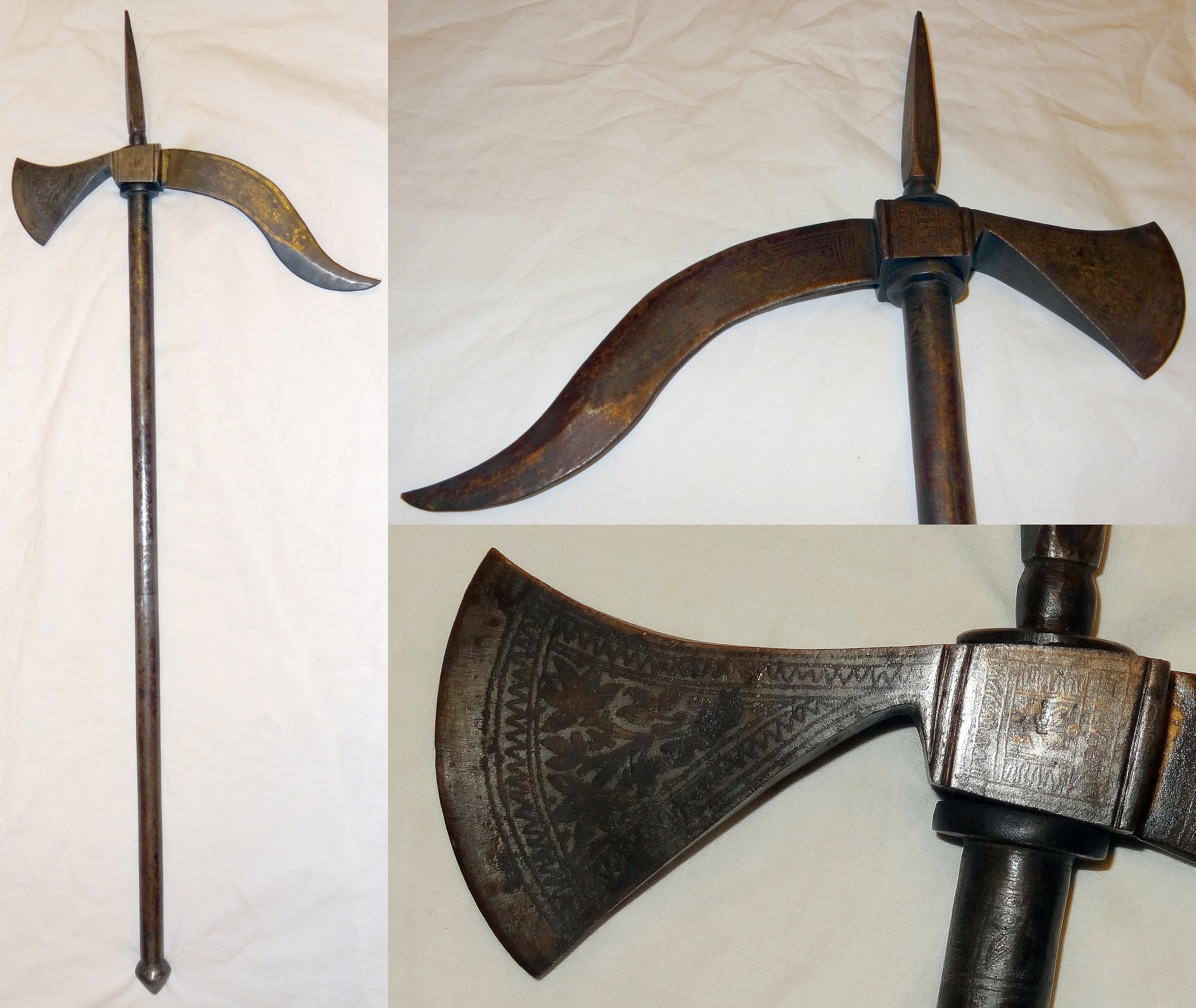
Indian tabar-zaghnal, a combination tabar axe and zaghnal war hammer - pick, all-steel construction, 18th to 19th century

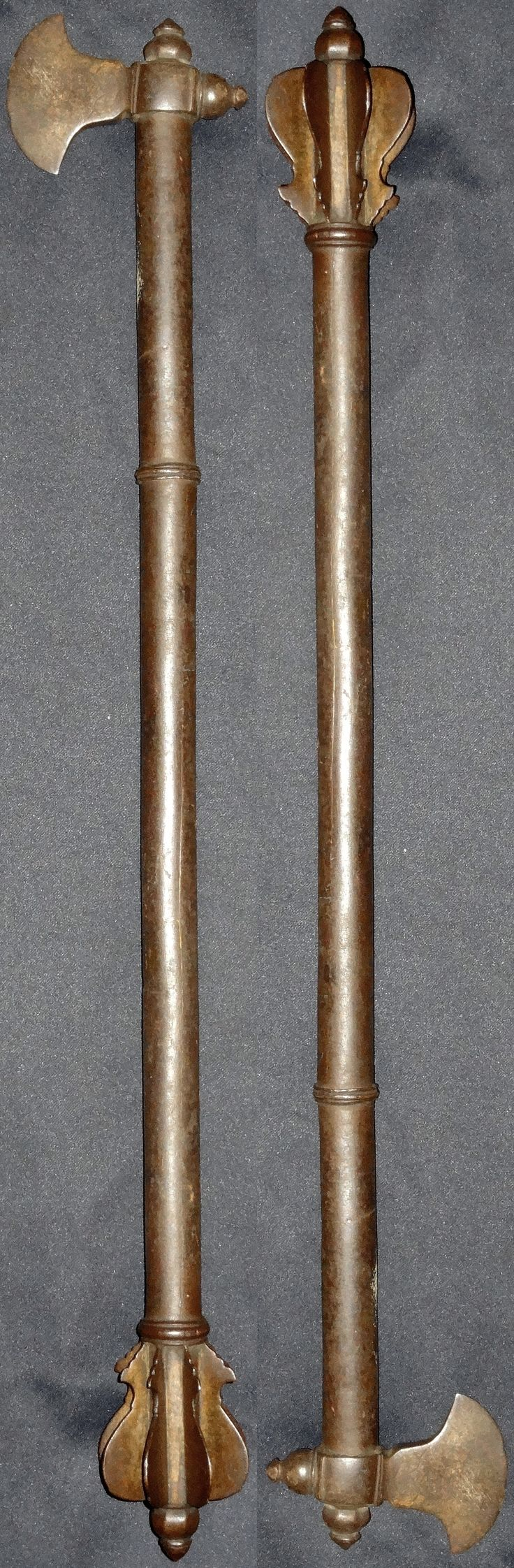
Indian (Deccan) tabar-shishpar, an extremely rare combination tabar axe and shishpar eight-flanged mace, steel with hollow shaft, 21.75 inches, 17th to 18th century

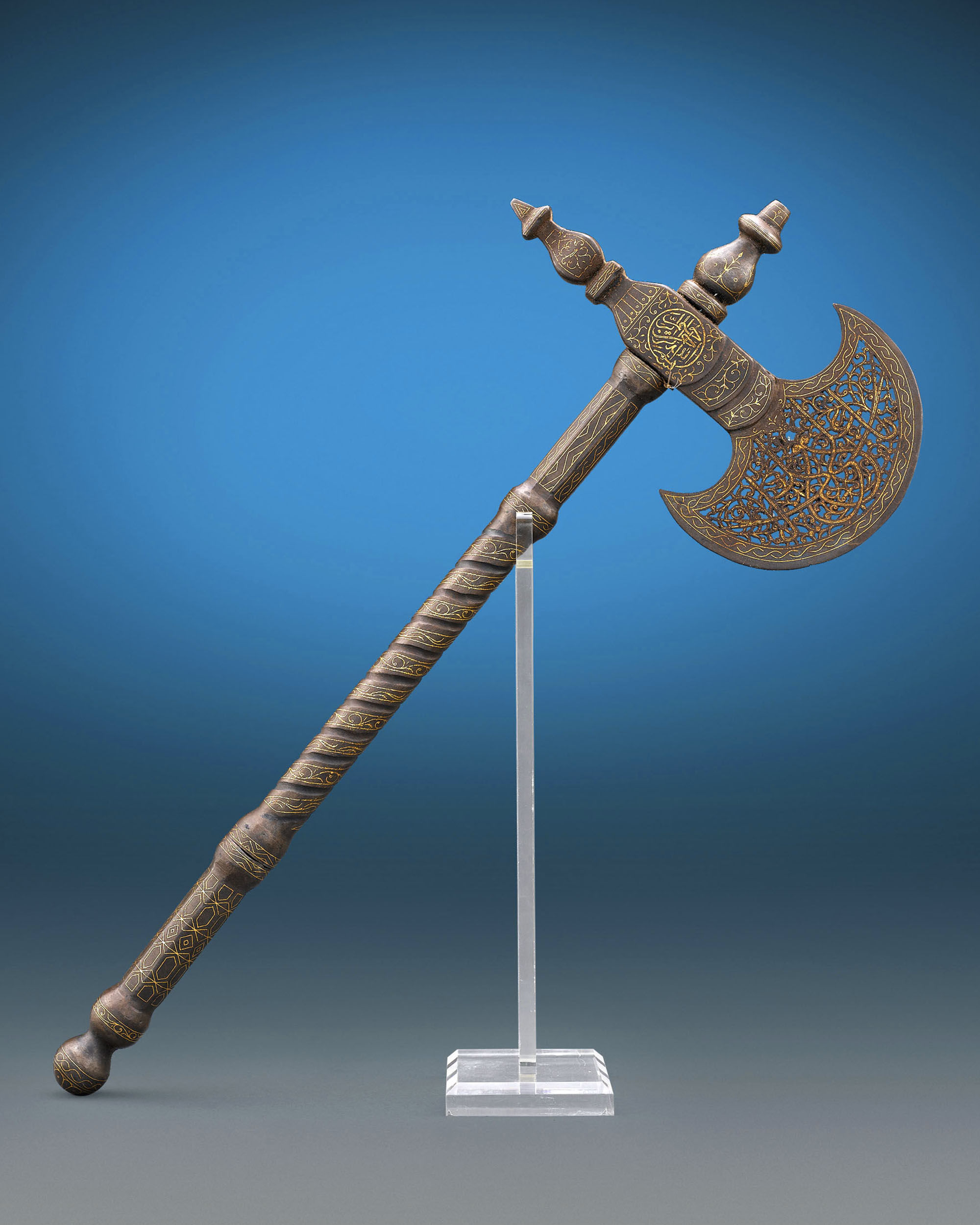
18th century Persian ceremonial tabar, crafted of steel with gold koftgari inlay, Kufic calligraphy and pierced decorations

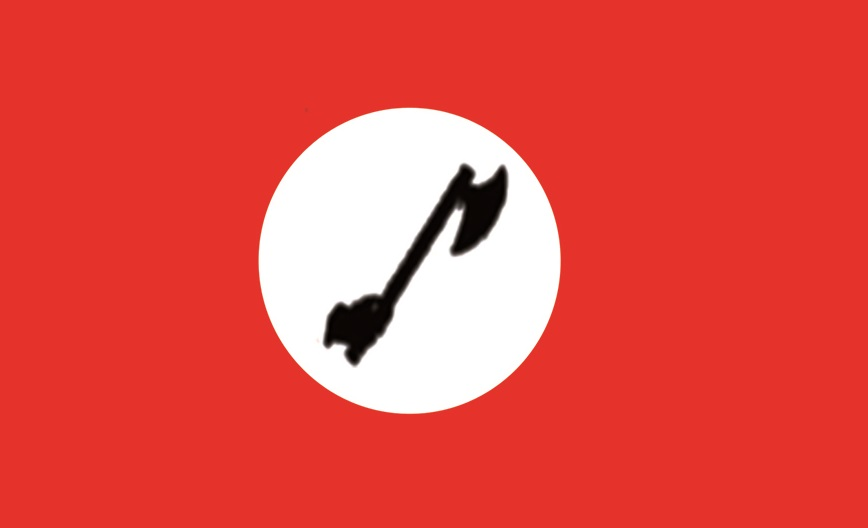
Flag of Sindhudesh movement.

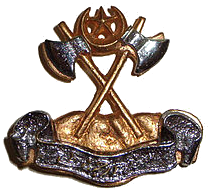
Badge of Sindh Regiment an infantry regiment in Pakistan army.

== See also ==
- Battle axe

== Sources ==
- Sussex, Roland; Cubberley, Paul (2011), The Slavic Languages, Cambridge University Press, ISBN 978-0-521-29448-5
