= 100th Division (Imperial Japanese Army) =

- 第100師団
- Active: 15 June 1944 – 7 September 1945
- Country: Empire of Japan
- Allegiance: 35th army
- Branch: Imperial Japanese Army
- Type: Infantry
- Size: 14960
- Garrison/HQ: Mindanao
- Nickname: Occupation division
- Engagements: World War II: Battle of Davao

Commanders
- Notable commanders: Jiro Harada

The 100th Division (第100師団, Dai-ihhyaku Shidan) was an infantry division in the Imperial Japanese Army. Its call sign was the Occupation Division (拠兵団, Kyo Heidan).

It was created 15 June 1944 in Mindanao under command of Lieutenant-General Jiro Harada. The nucleus for the formation was the 30th Independent Mixed Brigade and reinforcements sent from Moji 29 May 1944. It was a type C(hei) security division.

== Action ==
The 100th division was assigned to the 35th army upon formation. It garrisoned a large area of Mindanao island centering at Davao. In the course of the Battle of Davao since 27 April 1945, the 100th division was squeezed to the mountains north-west of Davao and survived until news of the surrender of Japan reached it 18 August 1945. The division officially surrendered to US forces on the 7th of September, 1945.

== See also ==
- List of Japanese infantry divisions
- Independent Mixed Brigades (Imperial Japanese Army)

== References and further reading ==
- Madej, W. Victor. Japanese Armed Forces Order of Battle, 1937-1945 [2 vols] Allentown, PA: 1981

This article incorporates material from the article 第100師団 (日本軍) in the Japanese Wikipedia, retrieved on 24 June 2016.
