= Gyosaku Morozumi =

Lieutenant-General of the Imperial Japanese Army (1884–1963)

- 両角 業作
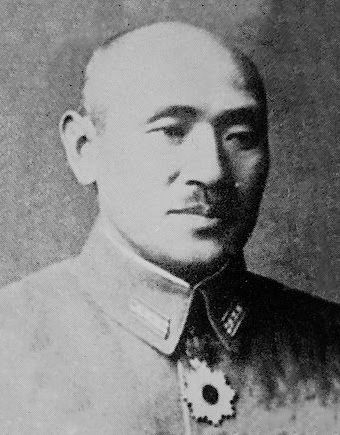
- Born: 4 January 1884; Nagano prefecture, Japan
- Died: 15 September 1963 (aged 79); Japan
- Military career
- Allegiance: Empire of Japan
- Branch: Imperial Japanese Army
- Service years: 1905–1945
- Rank: Lieutenant General
- Unit: Imperial Japanese Army
- Commands: IJA 30th Division; IJA 35th Army
- Conflicts: Second Sino-Japanese War; World War II

Gyosaku Morozumi (両角 業作, Morozumi Gyōsaku; 4 January 1884 – 15 September 1963) was a general in the Imperial Japanese Army, commanding the Japanese ground forces for the Battle of Mindanao in 1945, especially in the closing months of the war.

== Biography ==
Morozumi was born in Nagano prefecture. He graduated from the 22nd class of the Imperial Japanese Army Academy in May 1905, serving initially with the IJA 58th Infantry Regiment, a new regiment which had been raised as a reserve force in the closing stages of the Russo-Japanese War. As a second lieutenant, he returned to the Army's Infantry Warfare School, where he specialized in armor. His rise through the ranks was uneventful, serving a staff post with the Inspectorate General of Military Training, and a field posting as battalion commanders within the IJA 59th Infantry Regiment, IJA 1st Infantry Regiment, IJA 29th Infantry Regiment and IJA 65th Infantry Regiments and as commander of the Hongo Regimental District. The IJA 65th Regiment was one of the units at the Battle of Nanking in 1937 during the Second Sino-Japanese War and was accused of the massacre of prisoners of war following the battle's end.

Morozumi was promoted to major general in August 1939. At the start of the Pacific War, he was assigned to the IJA 39th Division, which was still engaged in operations in mainland China, including the Battle of Zaoyang–Yichang and the Central Hubei Operation. In 1943, he became commander of the IJA 5th Depot Division In March 1944, Morozumi was promoted to lieutenant general and was given command of the IJA 30th Division, which was a garrison force based in Korea. However, in November of the same year, the IJA 30th Division was ordered to the Philippines and Morozumi was based in Surigao in northeastern Mindanao under the overall command of the IJA 35th Army. After General Sosaku Suzuki, commander of the IJA 35th Army transferred to Leyte in order to better coordinate defenses against the invading Allies in the Battle of Leyte, Morozumi was left in command with the defenses of the island of Mindanao, which soon came under attack by the American 24th, 31st, and 40th Infantry Divisions and the Philippine Commonwealth military including local resistance fighters.

By April 1945, his forces were split and isolated. Morozumi was officially confirmed as commander of the IJA 35th Army after Suzuki was killed in battle on 19 April. However, in practice, Morozumi largely ignored his appointment, knowing that communications were too poor to permit any real supervision of the other elements under his nominal command. He surrender his forces on Mindanao to Brigadier general Joseph C. Hutchinson, Acting Commander, 31st Infantry Division on 8 September 1945.
