= Battle of Mindanao =

WWII battle in the Pacific theater

Coordinates: 8°00′N 125°00′E

- Part of the Pacific Theater of World War II
- LCM carries U.S. troops up the Mindanao River to Fort Pikit
Date	March 10th – August 15th, 1945
Location	Mindanao Island, Philippines
Result	Allied victory

Belligerents
United States: Commonwealth of the Philippines	Japan: Second Philippine Republic

Commanders and leaders
(United States) Robert L. Eichelberger (United States) Franklin C. Sibert (United States) Roscoe B. Woodruff (United States) Clarence A. Martin (United States) Wendell Fertig (Commonwealth of the Philippines) Salipada K. Pendatun	(Empire of Japan) Gyosaku Morozumi (Empire of Japan) Yoshiiharu Tomochika (Empire of Japan) Jiro Harada (Empire of Japan) Naoji Doi

Units involved
(United States) Eighth Army: X Corps; 24th Infantry Division; 31st Infantry Division; (Philippines) Philippine Army: Maranao Militia Force	(Empire of Japan) 35th Army: 30th Infantry Division; 100th Infantry Division; 54th Mixed Brigade; (Empire of Japan) Combined Fleet: 32nd Naval Base Force

Strength
60,000, plus 32,000 guerrillas	65,000, including 12,000 civilians

Casualties and losses
221 killed and 665 wounded on Zamboanga Peninsula 820 killed and 2,880 wounded on E. Mindanao	6,400 killed and 1,100 captured on Zamboanga Peninsula 12,865 killed, 600 captured, 8,235 missing on E. Mindanao

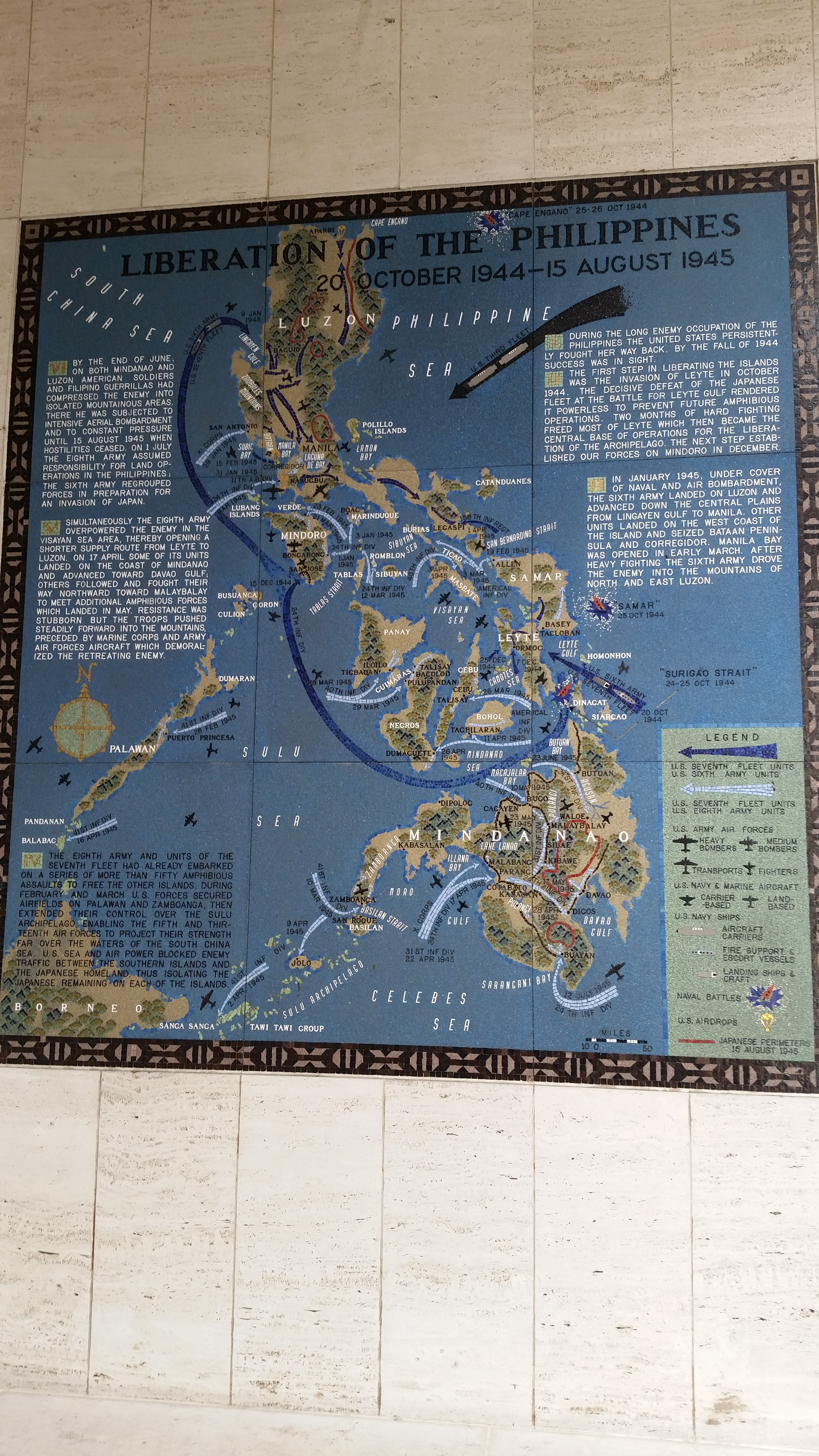
Battle of Mindanao map at the Manila American Cemetery and Memorial

The Battle of Mindanao (Filipino: Labanan sa Mindanaw; Cebuano: Panagsangka sa Mindanaw; Japanese: ミンダナオの戦い) was fought by the Americans and allied Filipino guerrillas against the Japanese forces on the island of Mindanao in the Philippines as part of Operation VICTOR V. It was part of the campaign to liberate the Philippines during World War II. The battle was waged to complete the recapture of the southernmost portions of the archipelago from the Imperial Japanese Army.

== Background ==
The campaign for Mindanao posed the greatest challenge for the liberating Allied forces, primarily for three reasons: the island's inhospitable geography; the extended Japanese defenses; and the strength and condition of the Japanese forces, which contained the significantly remaining concentration of combat troops in the Philippines.

Like most of the Philippine Islands and other similar places the U.S. Army operated elsewhere in the Pacific, the geographical conditions of Mindanao, the second largest island in the Philippines, offered very little inspiration for soldiers who would have to fight there. It boasted a long and irregular coastline, and the topography was generally characterized as rugged and mountainous. Rain forests and numerous crocodile-infested rivers covered the terrain, the rest by either lake, swamp or grassland. These grassland regions—along with dense groves of abacá trees, a source of hemp fiber—offer the worst obstacles, limiting vision and sapping the strength of soldiers.

The few roads in Mindanao further complicated the problem of movement. The generously named Highway 1 cut across the southern portion of the island, from just south of Parang on Illana Bay in the west to Digos on Davao Gulf in the east and then north to Davao. The other, Sayre Highway the main north-south road, started at Kabacan, midway between Illana Bay and Davao Gulf, then ran north through the mountains of Bukidnon and Macajalar Bay (off Misamis Oriental Province) on the northern coast.

The strongest of the Japanese defenses were concentrated around the Davao Gulf area, which was heavily mined to counter an amphibious landing, and in Davao City, the island's largest and most important city. Artillery and anti-aircraft batteries extensively ringed the coastal shoreline defenses. Believing that the Americans would ultimately attack from Davao Gulf and also anticipating that they would be eventually driven from the city, the Japanese also prepared defensive bunkers inland behind its perimeter where they could retire and regroup, with the intention of prolonging the campaign as long as possible.

=== Operation VICTOR V ===
On 10 March 1945, the U.S. Eighth Army—under Lieutenant General Robert L. Eichelberger—was formally ordered by General Douglas MacArthur to clear the rest of Mindanao, with the start of Operation VICTOR V, with expectations that the campaign would take four months. Eichelberger had misgivings about the projected timetable. His Eighth Army staff came up with a more effective plan.

Instead of the expected headlong frontal assault on the Japanese defenses, the plan called for securing a beachhead at Illana Bay in the undefended west, then driving eastward more than 100 miles (160 km) through jungles and mountains to strike from the rear. The objective, which called for achieving surprise and pressing forward quickly and aggressively by the invading forces, Eichelberger deemed, could unhinge the Japanese both physically and psychologically. The key to success involved the beachhead performance of the landing force and the ability of units to maintain the momentum of their attack, preempting Japanese reactions, and hopefully before the rainy season started, which would impede movement.

Ground operations were assigned to X Corps, under Major General Franklin C. Sibert, with Major General Roscoe B. Woodruff's 24th Infantry Division and Major General Clarence A. Martin's 31st Infantry Division as the principal combat units. Amphibious Task Group 78.2 (TG 78.2), under Rear Admiral Albert G. Noble, was tasked to carry the 24th Division and X Corps headquarters to the assault beaches near Malabang by 17 April to secure a forward airfield. Five days later, the 31st Division was expected to be in Parang, 20 miles (32 km) south, located near Highway 1, the route to Davao.

== Battle ==
=== Capture of Zamboanga and Sulu ===
On the same day Eichelberger's forces were ordered to invade Mindanao, remnants of Major General Jens A. Doe's 41st Infantry Division carried out Operation VICTOR IV, the seizure of Zamboanga, the large peninsula that extended to the southwest, concurrent with the recapture of Palawan, dubbed Operation VICTOR III. A sizable force—numbering about 8,900 men of Lt. Gen. Tokichi Hojo's 54th Japanese Independent Mixed Brigade (IMB)—had established strong defensive positions around Zamboanga City at the southern tip of the peninsula.

The slow construction of the airfield at Palawan posed a problem for tactical air support augmenting the Zamboanga operation. With the seizure of a makeshift airstrip at Dipolog, about 145 miles (233 km) to the northeast of Zamboanga City, the Americans rapidly exploited the opportunity, airlifting two reinforced companies from the 21st Infantry Regiment, 24th Division to ensure control of the airstrip. Soon thereafter, Marine Aircraft Groups Zamboanga (MAGSZAM) under Col. Clayton C. Jerome was flying sorties off the airstrip to cover naval bombardment and landing preparations off Zamboanga City.

After the bombing of the landing areas by the 13th Air Force and a three-day bombardment by the U.S. Navy, the 162nd and 163rd Infantry Regiments landed 3 miles (4.8 km) west of Zamboanga City at San Mateo. Japanese opposition to the landings were minimal, and the 41st Division troops quickly captured the city, which was decimated by the pre-invasion bombardments. The next day, 11 March, the Americans encountered strong resistance when they attacked Japanese positions in the hills overlooking the coastal plain. For two weeks, American infantry—ably supported by Marine aviation and naval gunfire—fought the Japanese along a 5 miles (8.0 km) front, in terrain so rugged that tanks could not be used, and in positions heavily fortified with deep earthen emplacements, barbed wire, minefields, and booby traps.

On 23 March, after heavy fighting, the center of the Japanese line finally broke, and in the next three days, the 162nd Infantry continued eliminating resistance in the central sector. The 186th Infantry replaced the 163rd and continued the attack. The 54th Japanese IMB was forced to pull out a week later, harried by guerrilla units, retreating through the peninsula and into the jungle. After some time, mopping-up operations resulted in 220 Americans killed, compared to 6,400 Japanese dead.

Alongside the Zamboanga operation, smaller units of the 41st Division invaded the Sulu Archipelago, a long stretch of islands reaching from the Zamboanga Peninsula to north Borneo. Rapidly taken in succession were Basilan, Malamaui, Tawi-Tawi, Sanga Sanga and Bangao. On 15 April, strong resistance at Jolo was encountered. Anchoring their stubborn defense around Mount Daho, some 3,750 Japanese troops held off the 163rd Infantry, supported by Filipino guerrillas. By 22 April, the Allies took the position after hard fighting and the rest of the Japanese troops fled and held out in the west for another two months. The 163rd suffered 35 dead and 125 wounded by mid-June 1945, while some 2,000 Japanese perished.

Senshi Sōsho in its Operation to conquer the Philippines (比島攻略作戦) and Navy Invasion Operations in the Philippines and Malaya Area (比島・マレー方面海軍進攻作戦) as part of its invasion series does not mention the Battle of Tamparan. In the Battle of Tamparan, Muslim Moros massacred 85 Japanese out of a 90 strong unit using mainly swords against Japanese armed with rifles, which is testified to by Japanese survivors. The memoirs written by the Japanese survivors in the Tanaka battalion of the battle accuse the Muslims of being "unmanageble", violent, ferocious and fanatic and a Japanese officer Lt. Col. Tanaka Yoshinari said that they were "local natives yet uncivilized in the ways of the Empire" and the Japanese viewed the Muslims as "inferior" and "savages".

Senshi Sōsho's Shō-gō rikugun-sakusen (2), published by Japan's Defence Ministry Bōeichō senshishitsu, is contradicted by Japan's own Ministry of Health and Welfare (社会・援護局) on the number of Japanese dead on the island of Jolo during the Battle of Sulu (スールー諸島の戦い). The Japanese Ministry of Health and Welfare says 6,030 Japanese were in Jolo and most of them were killed, in contrast to Senshi Sōsho which claims there were only 3,425 Japanese of the Independent Combined (Mixed) 55th Brigade (独立混成第55旅団 (日本軍)) on the island. Senshi Sōsho says 135 Japanese survived out of the 3,425 in total on Jolo, and that the casualty rate was 96%, and only mentions the battle on Jolo starting after the American landing on 9 April in 1945 and attributes most Japanese casualties to American actions. barely mentioning local Muslim Moro guerillas.

Japan Center for Asian Historical Records (JACAR) gives yet a totally different number from both Senshi Sōsho and the Japanese Ministry of Health and Welfare, saying there were 3,875 Japanese soldiers in Jolo.

Japanese veterans who actually survived the Battle of Sulu on Jolo, endorsed the number by the Japanese Ministry of Health and Welfare that said 6,030 Japanese were there and most of them were killed except 88 survivors, with the Japanese veterans saying one third were killed by local Muslim guerillas right after the 55th mixed brigade landed on Jolo on 4 October 1944 a year before the Americans landed, one third killed by Americans after they landed in Jolo in April 1945, and one third dead of disease.

Japanese survivors reported being slaughtered, beheaded, and barely putting up a fight with "pathetic" deaths by the Moro counter-insurgents. Worsening the issue was the lack of supplies or support from the Japanese military. Japanese survivors, armed with mountain artillery, reported being "overwhelmed like children" by Moro weaponry, which included rifles, kris daggers, tabar axes, bolo and barong knives, campilan swords, spears, and bows. Japanese were regularly beheaded in ambushes by Muslim guerillas with swords.

American military sources also contradict Senshi Sōsho on Jolo, the Americans said 3,900 Japanese were still lodged on Jolo's Mount Daho after the Americans landed in April in 1945, not counting Japanese already killed by local Muslim guerillas in the year before that, and then the Americans and guerillas both attacked Mount Daho to kill the remaining Japanese. The American 41st infantry took a picture and met with local guerillas in Indanan village on Jolo, from the guerilla Company C, 1st Bn, 125th Infantry.

15 and 16 year old Japanese conscripts were sent with just bamboo spears and no guns to reinforce Japanese soldiers in Zamboanga in the Battle of Mindanao, who were fighting "ferocious head hunters" Muslim Moros, who the Japanese deeply hated and feared. The Japanese medic who witnessed this then realised Japan lost. He also said that Japanese university graduates were automatically given officer positions even though they had no knowledge about warfare. The Japanese medic was forced to lick leaves for water and eat lizards, snakes and cats due to a lack of food supplies in the jungle. The Japanese military did not send any medical packages, orders or military supplies to his garrison. They were ordered to perform vivisections on children. The remaining 100 Japanese surviviors of the brigade were starving to death and forced to scavenge for water and food around the mountains as the Muslim guerillas steadily killed their remaining officers. The Japanese 363rd battalion were starving and struck with malnutrition due to lack of food after reaching Mount Tumantangas. Japanese infected with malafria were just left to die by other Japanese. Japanese soldiers stole food supplies from dead and still living but sick Japanese and fought each other for food. At Tumantangas mountain, Japanese wounded and ill were left to die by fellow Japanese who stole their rucksacks and food as Japanese units fought each other for the remaining food, one of the Japanese officers who was left to die was regarded as a tyrant by his men.

Senshi Sosho cites the 365th Independent Infantry Battallion Major Fujikichi Tenmei claiming 55th Independent Mixed Brigade commander Major General Tetsuzo Suzuki was killed in action against Americans between 31 July and 2 August 1945 in the middle of Jolo while fighting on the north-south road.

55th Independent Mixed Brigade quartermaster officer at brigade headquarters, Major Takeo Inoue wrotea memoir called "The Crossroads of Fate - Jolo Island, the Island of Annihilation, Was an Isolated Island in the South Seas Inhabited by the Ferocious Moro People" in which his description of the death of brigade commander Major General Tetsuzo Suzuki contradicts Senshi Sosho. Inoue gives a less glorious depiction of Suzuki's death, saying his health failed so much he could not walk when being pursued by Muslim Moro guerillas and soldiers had to use branches to make an improvised stretcher for him, and the soldiers themselves were weak and all of them fell, and then they tied him to a donkey to transport him and he died after being tossed around carried on cliffs, valleys, and steep slopes. He eventually died when they were at the bottom of a valley. Muslim Moro guerillas were chasing the defeating Japanese around the island so they couldn't even give him a burial or ceremony and just dumped his corpse in the valley and he was replaced by Major Kikuo Takeda. Inoue said only 3 field officers including himself survived, with Major Tenmei and an unnamed other battalion commander, with only 81 survivors in total.

Japanese continued to fear Muslim Moros so much they could not collect remains of dead Japanese on Jolo island from the Battle of Sulu (スールー諸島の戦い) for decades after the war out of sheer terror. According to an article on 18 February 1958 in Mainichi Shimbun, Japanese officers on a ship called Ginga Maru tried to collect remains of Japanese soldiers on Jolo after the war, but they saw plumes of white smoke on the island as they docked and refused to step foot on the island, fearing another Moro attack against them.

A blurb commntary sourced to the Japanese Ministry of Health and Welfare Relief Bureau on the paperback edition of Japanese 55th Independent Mixed Brigade artillery unit veteran Fujioka Akiyoshi's memoir "Record of Defeat - A Record of the Battlefield of Jolo Island" confirms the Japanese could not collect remains of Japanese soldiers out of fear of Moros: "The first attempt to collect remains took place from January to February 1956, eleven years after the end of the war, but the collection team was put in danger and not a single set of remains could be recovered. Subsequently, 50 sets of remains were recovered in 1968, 1,430 the following year, and 450 in 1974, but no such collections were carried out in hilly or mountainous areas, and 'there are no plans for such collections in the immediate future' (Ministry of Health and Welfare Relief Bureau)."

55th Independent Mixed Brigade artillery unit veteran Tatsuzo Okumura wrote another book called "Jolo island war chronicles" about the battle. Okumura heard about Fujioka's surrender himself during the battle. Okumura admitted in his book that the Japanese were invaders fighting against indigenous population and that the Muslim Moros fought against all colonial invaders of their land, including Japan, United States and Spain and talked about how the Moros struck terror into the Japanese. In the preface of the book, Tatsuzo Okumura said he hallucinated seeing his dead comrades begging to come with him when he and the surviving Japanese POWs were being sent to a camp: "At that moment [when being transported from Jolo Island to a POW camp on Mindanao], I saw the figures of my comrades on the receding beach of Jolo Island. I saw them—those who had wasted away and died in the jungle—crowding the shore and calling out at the top of their lungs: 'Hey! Are you leaving? Take us with you!'"

A Muslim Moro guerilla band led by Mohammad Adil did not lose any dead while fighting and killing Japanese and inflicting "vengeful retaliation" against the Japanese for their atrocities. Mohammad Adil's unit was designated as the 119th regiment and he was designated as third lieutenant and he was just 19. Thomas Mckenna wrote a biography of Mohammed Adil.

Japanese army allowed conscripts at and above middle school level to become staff cadets but Fujioka Akiyoshi refused. A Japanese officer threatened to chop up any Japanese soldier who took up American leaflets calling them to surrender, which most Japanese soldiers like Fujioka Akiyoshi wanted to surrender. The Japanese soldiers including Fujioka, Private Superior Class Nishida, Lace Corporal Yamada, Lance Corporal Takeuchi, Navy Petty Officer Sugawara, Sergeant Major Toki. secretly deserted to surrender to the Americans and celebrated it. Fujioka was given a bamboo spear instead of a gun when deployed near Manila at Bongabon in Luzon on 17 July. Fujioka was among those soldiers who supported the Japanese constitution's revision against war and celebrated the defeat of the Japanese military.

=== Siege of Malabang ===
As Rear Admiral Noble's TG 78.2 moved toward Illana Bay to prepare the landings at Parang, Colonel Wendell Fertig—commander of guerrilla forces in Mindanao—sent word that his guerrillas controlled Malabang and its airstrip. Starting on 5 April, Colonel Jerome's Marine aviators from Dipolog moved to the Malabang airstrip, and with targeting information from the guerrillas, proceeded to bomb the Japanese positions. By 11 April, the remaining Japanese forces fled toward Parang, and friendly forces were in complete control of Malabang. Sibert, Woodruff, and Noble realized they had the opportunity to speed up the initial penetration of central Mindanao and quickly changed their plans to take advantage of the new developments. The 24th Division would come ashore at Parang, much closer to Highway 1, thus speeding up the operation.

=== Push to central Mindanao ===
While the Parang landings proceeded on 17 April and the 24th Division quickly heading inland, the Eighth Army planners assumed correctly that the Japanese might destroy the bridges along Highway 1, and they decided to use the 533rd Engineer Boat and Shore Regiment, 3rd Engineer Special Brigade to exploit the Mindanao River. This waterway ran roughly parallel to Highway 1 and was navigable for 35 miles (56 km). A small fleet of gunboats—under the command of Lieutenant Colonel Roberto Amputs—sailed upriver and seized Kabacan and the junction of Highway 1 and Sayre Highway on 22 April. This startled the nearby Japanese garrisons, and they fled north and west. The Mindanao River became the main line of supply, as troops and rations were disgorged far upriver.

On 22 April, the 31st Division waded ashore, with Marine Aircraft Group 24 arriving at Malabang to provide air support for Mindanao ground operations. With both divisions ashore and ahead of schedule, General Sibert ordered the 24th to continue its advance up Highway 1 to Digos, then seize Davao City. The 31st would follow to Kabacan and then attack north up Sayre Highway toward Macajalar Bay.

Tactically, the Japanese blundered in allowing the Americans to seize the key road junction of Kabacan so easily; the 30th and 100th Japanese Divisions were hopelessly separated with the American advance, while allowing X Corps to build up momentum and ultimately lead to their destruction. That Japanese error was the direct result of the surprise achieved by Eichelberger's decision to land at Illana Bay.

With General Woodruff's 24th Division moving so rapidly, the Americans were almost on top of the Japanese around Davao before General Morozumi learned too late that the western landing was, in fact, not a diversion. Upon reaching Digos on 27 April, the Americans quickly overwhelmed the defending Japanese, who were prepared only to repel an assault from the sea, not from their rear. The 24th Division immediately turned north and headed toward Davao City.

=== Fighting in Davao City ===
On 3 May 1945, the first combat elements of the 24th Division entered Davao City against less opposition than had been expected. The Japanese had contented themselves with destroying the city as best they could before withdrawing inland. While it took just 15 days, despite severe heat and humidity and constant rain, with an entire division travelling 115 miles (185 km) and seizing the last major Philippine city under Japanese control, the real battle for Mindanao had begun. Up to this point, X Corps had deliberately bypassed the main Japanese defenses, which they planned to turn to eliminate them.

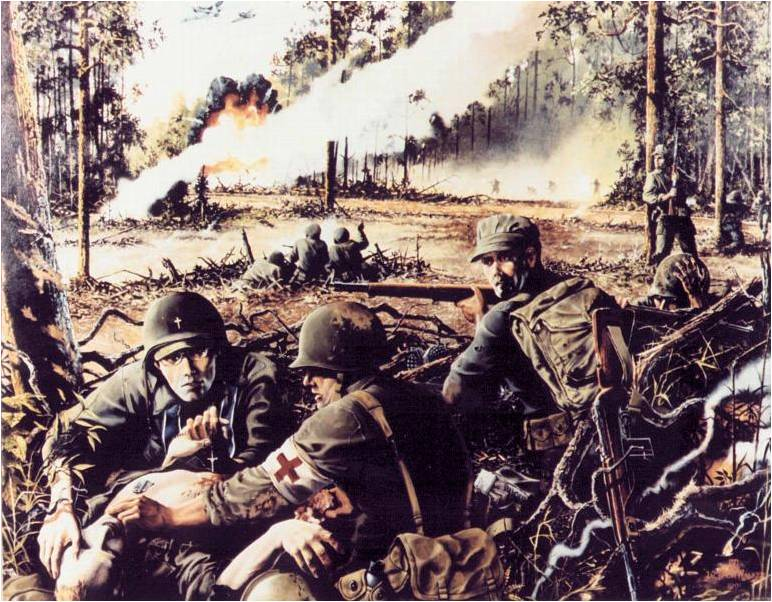
124th Infantry Regiment Colgan Woods by Jackson Walker

A chronicler for the 24th Division wrote:

The soldiers of the 24th Infantry, considered the post-Davao operations to be the hardest, bitterest and, most exhausting battle of the ten island campaigns. In addition to the tenacious defense put up by the Japanese, another punishing aspect of the subsequent combat was the proliferous fields of abaca. To the foot soldiers fighting in the Davao province, the word abaca was synonymous with hell...Countless acres around Davao are covered with these thick-stemmed plants, fifteen to twenty feet high; the plants grow as closely together as sugar cane, and their long, lush, green leaves are in a welter of green so dense that a strong man must fight with the whole weight of his body for each foot of progress...In the abaca fields, visibility was rarely more than ten feet. No breeze ever reached through the gloomy expanse of green, and more men—American and Japanese—fell prostrate from the overpowering heat than bullets. The common way for scouts to locate an enemy position in abaca fighting was to advance until they received machinegun fire at a range of three to five yards. For the next two months, in such an environment, the 24th Division fought the Japanese. While the infantry sought out the Japanese defenses, platoons and squads worked through the abaca and surrounding jungle to seek out enemy bunkers and spider holes.

In this way, fighting progressed slowly, but the Americans were making headway. At Libby Airdrome and the village of Mintal, some 5 miles (8.0 km) west of Davao City, the 21st Infantry Regiment was attacked on three sides by a numerically stronger enemy. Individual acts of heroism often spelled the difference between victory and defeat in the desperate fighting. On 14 May, posthumous Medal of Honor awardee, Private First Class James Diamond of D Company fell mortally wounded as he was leading a patrol to evacuate more casualties when came under heavy attack. He drew enemy fire while sprinting to an abandoned machinegun and was caught in a hail of bullets, but his sacrifice enabled his patrol to reach safety.

By 17 May, exhausted and bloodied, the 24th Division renewed its offensive, and this time, the 19th Infantry Regiment, supported by Fertig's guerrillas, blew open the Japanese eastern flanks before capturing the villages of Tacunan, Ula, Matina Biao, Magtuod and Mandug on 29 May. The Japanese 100th Division collapsed and retreated. But soon fighting erupted into pursuit and mopping-up operations against bypassed Japanese pockets, which later claimed the life of the 19th Infantry's commander, Colonel Thomas "Jock" Clifford Jr.

The fighting around the fringes of Davao City cost the 24th Infantry Division some 350 dead and 1,615 wounded, while the Japanese 100th Division suffered about 4,500 casualties.

=== The end of the Japanese resistance ===
Meanwhile, the 31st Division had forged ahead to the town of Kibawe on Highway 1, some 40 miles (64 km) away, since 27 April, with the 124th Infantry Regiment of Colonel Edward M.Cullen at point, where the first monsoon rains started creating havoc on the advance. Running into a Japanese battalion hurrying south, Lieutenant Colonel Robert M. Fowler's 2nd Battalion, with Battery B, 149th Field Artillery attached, engaged the Japanese with much needed artillery fire, killing at least 50 and sending the rest fleeing.

On 3 May, the 31st Division reached Kibawe, against stiffening Japanese resistance. The town led to a supposed Japanese supply trail that twisted and turned south, until it reached the ocean shore village of Talomo in Davao City. The treacherous terrain proved equally dangerous to both sides as they struggled in the ensuing battle for the Talomo trail on 11 May. About 1,000 Japanese held the trail, but jungle rain forests, torrential rains and abysmal trail conditions were the real factors. Airdropped supplies to the isolated infantrymen were common as the trail was impassable to motor vehicles. By 30 June, the 167th Infantry managed to move only 5 miles (8.0 km) beyond the Pulangi river, even with the assistance of Filipino guerrillas. It lost 80 men and 180 wounded to the Japanese, who themselves suffered about 400 dead.

On 6 May, the 124th Infantry Regiment continued to move up Sayre Highway without the Talomo trail reconnaissance operation in full swing, and in doing so, it moved into its toughest fight of the Mindanao campaign. A Japanese battalion, ordered by Morozumi to delay the 124th at Maramag some 30 miles (48 km) south to enable the regrouping of his 30th Division, did so with such ferocity, that it took six days for the 124th to reach Maramag. The battle area from Talomo to Maramag was later renamed Colgan Woods by the troops in remembrance of Captain Thomas A. Colgan, an Army chaplain who was killed during one of his repeated efforts to aid wounded soldiers in the line of fire. The battle was one of the many brutal struggles in the Pacific theater that never made any headlines.

Firing from dugout positions, camouflaged spider holes with connecting tunnels, and virtually invisible pillboxes, the defending Japanese chose to die in place rather than retreat. Banzai charges struck the 124th, fighting without supporting artillery, first on 7 May and then on the night of 14 May. The latter ended in a rout, as American automatic weapons stopped the attackers, killing 73 Japanese, marking the end of the battle. In the fighting for Colgan Woods and Maramag, the 124th Infantry lost 60 men and 120 wounded from 6 to 12 May.

The final stages of the battle for Mindanao culminated with the 155th Infantry Regiment of Colonel Walter J. Hanna occupying Malaybalay on 21 May and taking control of the Sayre Highway, together with the 108th Infantry Regiment of Colonel Maurice D. Stratta after a stiff fight with the Japanese. Morozumi's 30th Division continued their retreat up the Agusan Valley, after a vicious encounter with the pursuing 31st Division on 5 June, where they eventually made it into the jungle. Farther south on Mindanao, smaller X Corps units seized Sarangani and Balut islands, situated off its southern tip, and on 12 July, the 1st Battalion, 24th Division's 21st Infantry arrived at the northwest shore of Sarangani Bay to reinforce a reconnaissance patrol, which located a strong Japanese force in the interior and proceeded to pursue the Japanese through the jungle. Japanese forces retreated into Klaja Karst in the municipality of Buayan (now General Santos), where they made their last stand against mixed American forces and Filipino guerrillas that were operating in the area. Operations in these areas continued until mid-August, when American planes heavily bombed the land, resulting in large Japanese casualties. Some Japanese who have survived the bombings escaped to the forest, but were hunted down by the soldiers. The Japanese resistance in Mindanao was finally over.

== Aftermath ==
While mopping up operations by small American units and Filipino guerrillas continued for some time, General Eichelberger announced the end of organized Japanese resistance. Throughout Mindanao, pockets of Japanese troops, protected by the impenetrable terrain of the island's unexplored jungle expanses, survived until the end of the war, when some 22,250 troops and 11,900 civilians emerged to surrender. That signalled the total liberation of the Philippines. Some 12,865 Japanese troops were killed, and another 8,235 appeared to have succumbed to starvation and disease. The Americans lost only 820 men and 2,880 wounded for the entire campaign.

The seemingly low cost in battlefield casualties for the Americans in the Mindanao campaign stemmed, aside from the skill of the Eighth Army planners and leaders, from increasing assistance by Filipino guerrillas, which in military terms, constituted a valuable "force multiplier" for the Eighth Army units. Before landings, guerrillas harassed Japanese units, provided valuable intelligence about enemy dispositions and the relative suitability of landing beaches. And after each landing, the Filipinos fought alongside the Americans and pursued the Japanese through the island's interior.

== See also ==
- Military history of the Philippines during World War II
- Military history of the United States
- Military history of Japan
- History of the Philippines
