= USS LST-919 =

1944 LST-542-class tank landing ship

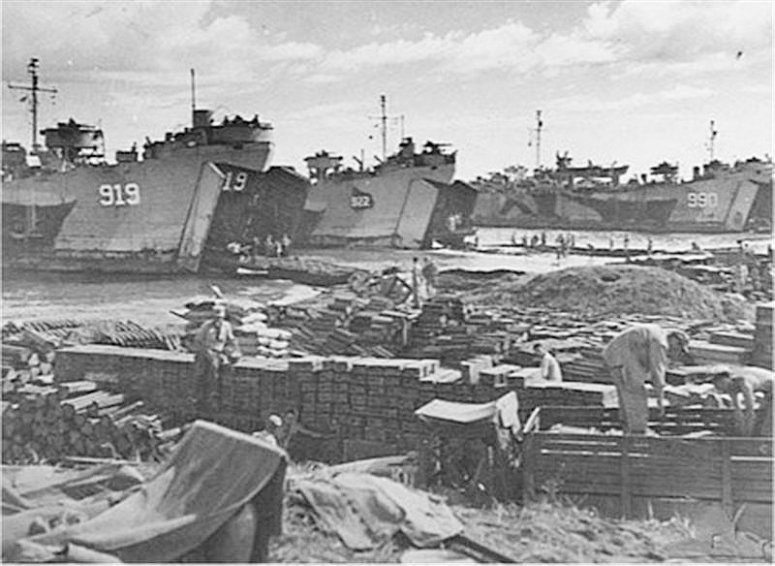
- USS LST-919, LST-922, and LST-990 beached at Mindoro Island, Philippines, 15 December 1944, unloading supplies and equipment.

History

United States
- Name: LST-919
- Builder: Bethlehem-Hingham Shipyard, Hingham, Massachusetts
- Yard number: 3389
- Laid down: 11 April 1944
- Launched: 17 May 1944
- Commissioned: 31 May 1944
- Decommissioned: 5 August 1946
- Stricken: 25 September 1946
- Identification: Hull symbol: LST-919; Code letters: NVSB
- Honors and awards: 3 × battle star
- Fate: Sold, 10 January 1948, resold to Argentina, 1 March 1948

Argentina
- Name: Cabo San Isidro
- Acquired: 1 March 1948
- Decommissioned: 8 August 1978
- Refit: converted to Motor Torpedo Boat tender, 1950
- Identification: Hull symbol: BDT6
- Fate: Transferred to the Naval Transport Service, 1959; Sold for scrapping, 23 March 1980

General characteristics
- Class & type: LST-542-class tank landing ship
- Displacement: 1,625 long tons (1,651 t) (light); 4,080 long tons (4,145 t) (full (seagoing draft with 1,675 short tons (1,520 t) load); 2,366 long tons (2,404 t) (beaching)
- Length: 328 ft (100 m) oa
- Beam: 50 ft (15 m)
- Draft: Unloaded: 2 ft 4 in (0.71 m) forward; 7 ft 6 in (2.29 m) aft; Full load: 8 ft 3 in (2.51 m) forward; 14 ft 1 in (4.29 m) aft; Landing with 500 short tons (450 t) load: 3 ft 11 in (1.19 m) forward; 9 ft 10 in (3.00 m) aft; Limiting 11 ft 2 in (3.40 m); Maximum navigation 14 ft 1 in (4.29 m)
- Installed power: 2 × 900 hp (670 kW) Electro-Motive Diesel 12-567A diesel engines; 1,800 shp (1,300 kW)
- Propulsion: 1 × Falk main reduction gears; 2 × Propellers
- Speed: 11.6 kn (21.5 km/h; 13.3 mph)
- Range: 24,000 nmi (44,000 km; 28,000 mi) at 9 kn (17 km/h; 10 mph) while displacing 3,960 long tons (4,024 t)
- Boats & landing craft carried: 2 x LCVPs
- Capacity: 1,600–1,900 short tons (3,200,000–3,800,000 lb; 1,500,000–1,700,000 kg) cargo depending on mission
- Troops: 16 officers, 147 enlisted men
- Complement: 13 officers, 104 enlisted men
- Armament: Varied, ultimate armament; 2 × twin 40 mm (1.57 in) Bofors guns; 4 × single 40 mm Bofors guns; 12 × 20 mm (0.79 in) Oerlikon cannons

Service record
- Operations: Leyte landings (18 October–6 November 1944); Lingayen Gulf landings (4–15 January 1945); Mindanao Island landings (17–23 April 1945)
- Awards: China Service Medal; American Campaign Medal; Asiatic–Pacific Campaign Medal; World War II Victory Medal; Navy Occupation Service Medal w/Asia Clasp; Philippine Republic Presidential Unit Citation; Philippine Liberation Medal

USS LST-919 was an LST-542-class tank landing ship in the United States Navy. Like many of her class, she was not named and is properly referred to by her hull designation.

== Construction ==
LST-919 was laid down on 11 April 1944, at Hingham, Massachusetts, by the Bethlehem-Hingham Shipyard; launched on 17 May 1944; and commissioned on 31 May 1944.

== Service history ==
During World War II, LST-919 was assigned to the Asiatic-Pacific theater and took part in the Leyte landings in October and November 1944, the Lingayen Gulf landings in January 1945, and the Mindanao Island landings in April 1945.

Following the war, LST-919 performed occupation duty in the Far East and saw service in China until early April 1946. She returned to the United States and was decommissioned on 5 August 1946, and struck from the Navy list on 25 September, that same year. On 10 January 1948, the ship was sold to Pablo N. Ferrari & Co. for operation. On 1 March 1948, she was resold to the government of Argentina.

=== Argentine service ===
In Argentine service, LST-919 was renamed Cabo San Isidro and redesignated BDT-6 (Buque Desembarco de Tanques), later Q46. She was retired in 1979. She still existed at the time of the Falklands War, but was not available for use.

== Awards ==
LST-919 earned three battle stars for World War II service.

== Bibliography ==
Online resources

- "LST-919". Dictionary of American Naval Fighting Ships. Naval History and Heritage Command. This article incorporates text from this source, which is in the public domain.
- "Bethlehem-Hingham, Hingham MA". www.ShipbuildingHistory.com. 11 August 2011.
- "USS LST-919". NavSource. 26 September 2015.

Printed resources

- Friedman, Norman (2002). US Amphibious Ships and Craft: An Illustrated Design History. Naval Institute Press. ISBN 1-55750-250-1.
