= USS LST-946 =

United States Navy tank landing ship

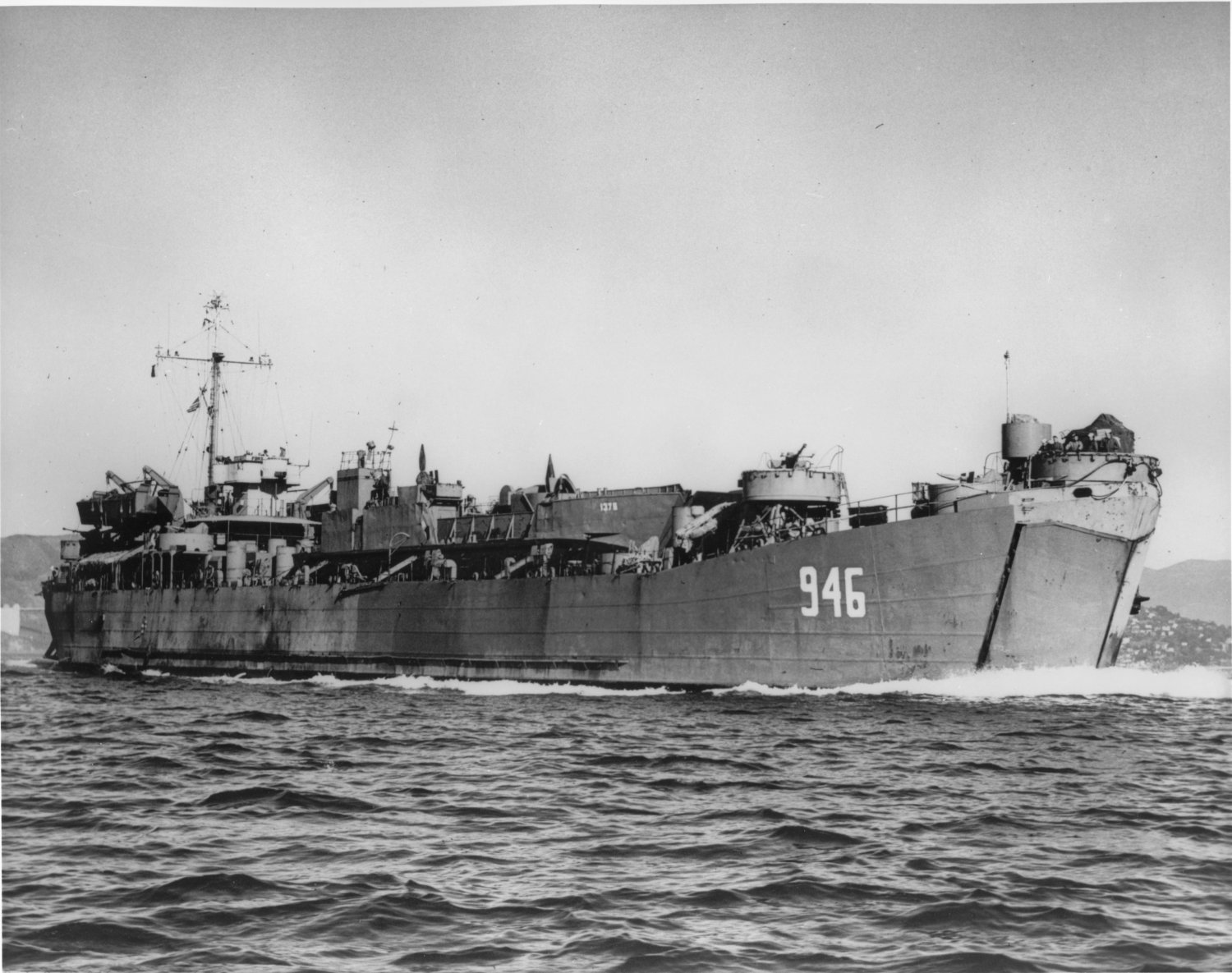
- USS LST-946 under way in San Francisco Bay after passing under the Golden Gate Bridge, c. early 1946 with LCT-1376 on board.

History

United States
- Name: LST-946
- Builder: Bethlehem-Hingham Shipyard, Hingham, Massachusetts
- Yard number: 3416
- Laid down: 15 August 1944
- Launched: 20 September 1944
- Commissioned: 12 October 1944
- Decommissioned: 25 June 1946
- Stricken: 31 July 1946
- Identification: Hull symbol: LST-946; Code letters: NVUD
- Honors and awards: 1 × battle star
- Fate: Sold for operation, 25 May 1948

General characteristics
- Class & type: LST-542-class tank landing ship
- Displacement: 1,625 long tons (1,651 t) (light); 4,080 long tons (4,145 t) (full (seagoing draft with 1,675 short tons (1,520 t) load); 2,366 long tons (2,404 t) (beaching)
- Length: 328 ft (100 m) oa
- Beam: 50 ft (15 m)
- Draft: Unloaded: 2 ft 4 in (0.71 m) forward; 7 ft 6 in (2.29 m) aft; Full load: 8 ft 3 in (2.51 m) forward; 14 ft 1 in (4.29 m) aft; Landing with 500 short tons (450 t) load: 3 ft 11 in (1.19 m) forward; 9 ft 10 in (3.00 m) aft; Limiting 11 ft 2 in (3.40 m); Maximum navigation 14 ft 1 in (4.29 m)
- Installed power: 2 × 900 hp (670 kW) Electro-Motive Diesel 12-567A diesel engines; 1,800 shp (1,300 kW)
- Propulsion: 1 × Falk main reduction gears; 2 × Propellers
- Speed: 11.6 kn (21.5 km/h; 13.3 mph)
- Range: 24,000 nmi (44,000 km; 28,000 mi) at 9 kn (17 km/h; 10 mph) while displacing 3,960 long tons (4,024 t)
- Boats & landing craft carried: 2 x LCVPs
- Capacity: 1,600–1,900 short tons (3,200,000–3,800,000 lb; 1,500,000–1,700,000 kg) cargo depending on mission
- Troops: 16 officers, 147 enlisted men
- Complement: 13 officers, 104 enlisted men
- Armament: Varied, ultimate armament; 2 × twin 40 mm (1.57 in) Bofors guns; 4 × single 40 mm Bofors guns; 12 × 20 mm (0.79 in) Oerlikon cannons

Service record
- Part of: LST Flotilla 21
- Operations: Assault and occupation of Okinawa Gunto (26 March–7 May 1945)
- Awards: American Campaign Medal; Asiatic–Pacific Campaign Medal; World War II Victory Medal; Navy Occupation Service Medal w/Asia Clasp; Philippine Liberation Medal

USS LST-946 was an LST-542-class tank landing ship in the United States Navy. Like many of her class, she was not named and is properly referred to by her hull designation.

== Construction ==
LST-946 was laid down on 15 August 1944, at Hingham, Massachusetts, by the Bethlehem-Hingham Shipyard; launched on 20 September 1944; and commissioned on 12 October 1944.

== Service history ==
During World War II LST-946 was assigned to the Asiatic-Pacific theater and participated in the assault and occupation of Okinawa Gunto from March through May 1945.

Following the war, she performed occupation duty in the Far East until mid-February 1946. She returned to the United States and was decommissioned on 25 June 1946, and struck from the Navy list on 31 July, that same year. On 25 May 1948, the ship was sold to the California Co., for operation.

== Awards ==
LST-946 earned one battle star for World War II service.

== Bibliography ==
Online resources

- "LST-946". Dictionary of American Naval Fighting Ships. Naval History and Heritage Command. This article incorporates text from this source, which is in the public domain.
- "Bethlehem-Hingham, Hingham MA". www.ShipbuildingHistory.com. 11 August 2011.
- "USS LST-946". NavSource. 6 November 2015.
