= USS LST-1065 =

1945 LST-542-class tank landing ship

History

United States
- Name: LST-1065
- Builder: Bethlehem-Hingham Shipyard, Hingham, Massachusetts
- Yard number: 3455
- Laid down: 12 January 1945
- Launched: 17 February 1945
- Commissioned: 16 March 1945
- Decommissioned: 23 May 1946
- Stricken: 23 June 1947
- Identification: Hull symbol: LST-1065; Code letters: NAID
- Fate: Sold for operation, 17 January 1948

Argentina
- Owner: Compania Naviera y Commercial Perez Compano S.A., Buenos Aires, Argentina
- Acquired: 17 January 1948
- Status: Fate unknown

General characteristics
- Class & type: LST-542-class tank landing ship
- Displacement: 1,625 long tons (1,651 t) (light); 4,080 long tons (4,145 t) (full (seagoing draft with 1,675 short tons (1,520 t) load); 2,366 long tons (2,404 t) (beaching)
- Length: 328 ft (100 m) oa
- Beam: 50 ft (15 m)
- Draft: Unloaded: 2 ft 4 in (0.71 m) forward; 7 ft 6 in (2.29 m) aft; Full load: 8 ft 3 in (2.51 m) forward; 14 ft 1 in (4.29 m) aft; Landing with 500 short tons (450 t) load: 3 ft 11 in (1.19 m) forward; 9 ft 10 in (3.00 m) aft; Limiting 11 ft 2 in (3.40 m); Maximum navigation 14 ft 1 in (4.29 m)
- Installed power: 2 × 900 hp (670 kW) Electro-Motive Diesel 12-567A diesel engines; 1,800 shp (1,300 kW)
- Propulsion: 1 × Falk main reduction gears; 2 × Propellers
- Speed: 11.6 kn (21.5 km/h; 13.3 mph)
- Range: 24,000 nmi (44,000 km; 28,000 mi) at 9 kn (17 km/h; 10 mph) while displacing 3,960 long tons (4,024 t)
- Boats & landing craft carried: 2 x LCVPs
- Capacity: 1,600–1,900 short tons (3,200,000–3,800,000 lb; 1,500,000–1,700,000 kg) cargo depending on mission
- Troops: 16 officers, 147 enlisted men
- Complement: 13 officers, 104 enlisted men
- Armament: Varied, ultimate armament; 2 × twin 40 mm (1.57 in) Bofors guns; 4 × single 40 mm Bofors guns; 12 × 20 mm (0.79 in) Oerlikon cannons

Service record
- Part of: LST Flotilla 33
- Awards: China Service Medal; American Campaign Medal; Asiatic–Pacific Campaign Medal; World War II Victory Medal; Navy Occupation Service Medal w/Asia Clasp

USS LST-1065 was an LST-542-class tank landing ship in the United States Navy. Like many of her class, she was not named and is properly referred to by her hull designation.

== Construction ==
LST-1065 was laid down on 12 January 1945, at Hingham, Massachusetts, by the Bethlehem-Hingham Shipyard; launched on 17 February 1945; and commissioned on 16 March 1945.

== Service history ==
Following World War II, LST-1065 performed occupation duty in the Far East and saw service in China until early January 1946. She was decommissioned on 23 May 1946, and struck from the Navy list on 23 June 1947. On 17 January 1948, the ship was sold to Compania Naviera y Commercial Perez Compano S.A., Buenos Aires, Argentina, for operation.

== Bibliography ==
Online resources

- "LST-1065". Dictionary of American Naval Fighting Ships. Naval History and Heritage Command. This article incorporates text from this source, which is in the public domain.
- "Bethlehem-Hingham, Hingham MA". ShipbuildingHistory.com. 11 August 2011.
- "USS LST-1065". NavSource. 9 September 2016.
