= USS LST-969 =

US Navy LST ship of WWII

History

United States
- Name: LST-969
- Builder: Bethlehem-Hingham Shipyard, Hingham, Massachusetts
- Yard number: 3439
- Laid down: 10 November 1944
- Launched: 13 December 1944
- Commissioned: 9 January 1945
- Decommissioned: 12 July 1946
- Stricken: 15 August 1946
- Identification: Hull symbol: LST-969; Code letters: NKIM
- Fate: Sold for operation, 25 April 1947

United States
- Name: New York
- Owner: American Overseas Chartering; Trailerships, Inc.
- Route: New York City to Albany, New York
- Acquired: 25 April 1947
- Out of service: September 1955
- Fate: Confiscated by US Marshals, September 1955

United States
- Name: New York
- Owner: McAllister Brothers
- Acquired: September 1955
- Status: fate unknown

General characteristics
- Class & type: LST-542-class tank landing ship
- Displacement: 1,625 long tons (1,651 t) (light); 4,080 long tons (4,145 t) (full (seagoing draft with 1,675 short tons (1,520 t) load); 2,366 long tons (2,404 t) (beaching)
- Length: 328 ft (100 m) oa
- Beam: 50 ft (15 m)
- Draft: Unloaded: 2 ft 4 in (0.71 m) forward; 7 ft 6 in (2.29 m) aft; Full load: 8 ft 3 in (2.51 m) forward; 14 ft 1 in (4.29 m) aft; Landing with 500 short tons (450 t) load: 3 ft 11 in (1.19 m) forward; 9 ft 10 in (3.00 m) aft; Limiting 11 ft 2 in (3.40 m); Maximum navigation 14 ft 1 in (4.29 m)
- Installed power: 2 × 900 hp (670 kW) Electro-Motive Diesel 12-567A diesel engines; 1,800 shp (1,300 kW)
- Propulsion: 1 × Falk main reduction gears; 2 × Propellers
- Speed: 11.6 kn (21.5 km/h; 13.3 mph)
- Range: 24,000 nmi (44,000 km; 28,000 mi) at 9 kn (17 km/h; 10 mph) while displacing 3,960 long tons (4,024 t)
- Boats & landing craft carried: 2 x LCVPs
- Capacity: 1,600–1,900 short tons (3,200,000–3,800,000 lb; 1,500,000–1,700,000 kg) cargo depending on mission
- Troops: 16 officers, 147 enlisted men
- Complement: 13 officers, 104 enlisted men
- Armament: Varied, ultimate armament; 2 × twin 40 mm (1.57 in) Bofors guns; 4 × single 40 mm Bofors guns; 12 × 20 mm (0.79 in) Oerlikon cannons

Service record
- Part of: LST Flotilla 31
- Awards: American Campaign Medal; Asiatic–Pacific Campaign Medal; World War II Victory Medal

USS LST-969 was an LST-542-class tank landing ship in the United States Navy. Like many of her class, she was not named and is properly referred to by her hull designation.

== Construction ==
LST-969 was laid down on 10 November 1944, at Hingham, Massachusetts, by the Bethlehem-Hingham Shipyard; launched on 13 December 1944; and commissioned on 9 January 1945.

== Service history ==
Following World War II, LST-969 performed logistic services between Hawaii and the west coast of the United States in 1945 and 1946, while assigned to the United States Pacific Fleet. She was decommissioned on 12 July 1946, and struck from the Navy list on 15 August, that same year. On 25 April 1947, the ship was sold to Trailer-ships, Inc., for operation.

== Bibliography ==
- "LST-969". Dictionary of American Naval Fighting Ships. Naval History and Heritage Command. 4 August 2015. This article incorporates text from this source, which is in the public domain.
- "Bethlehem-Hingham, Hingham MA". ShipbuildingHistory.com. 11 August 2011.
- "USS LST-969". NavSource. 27 May 2016.
