= USS LST-913 =

US Navy ship

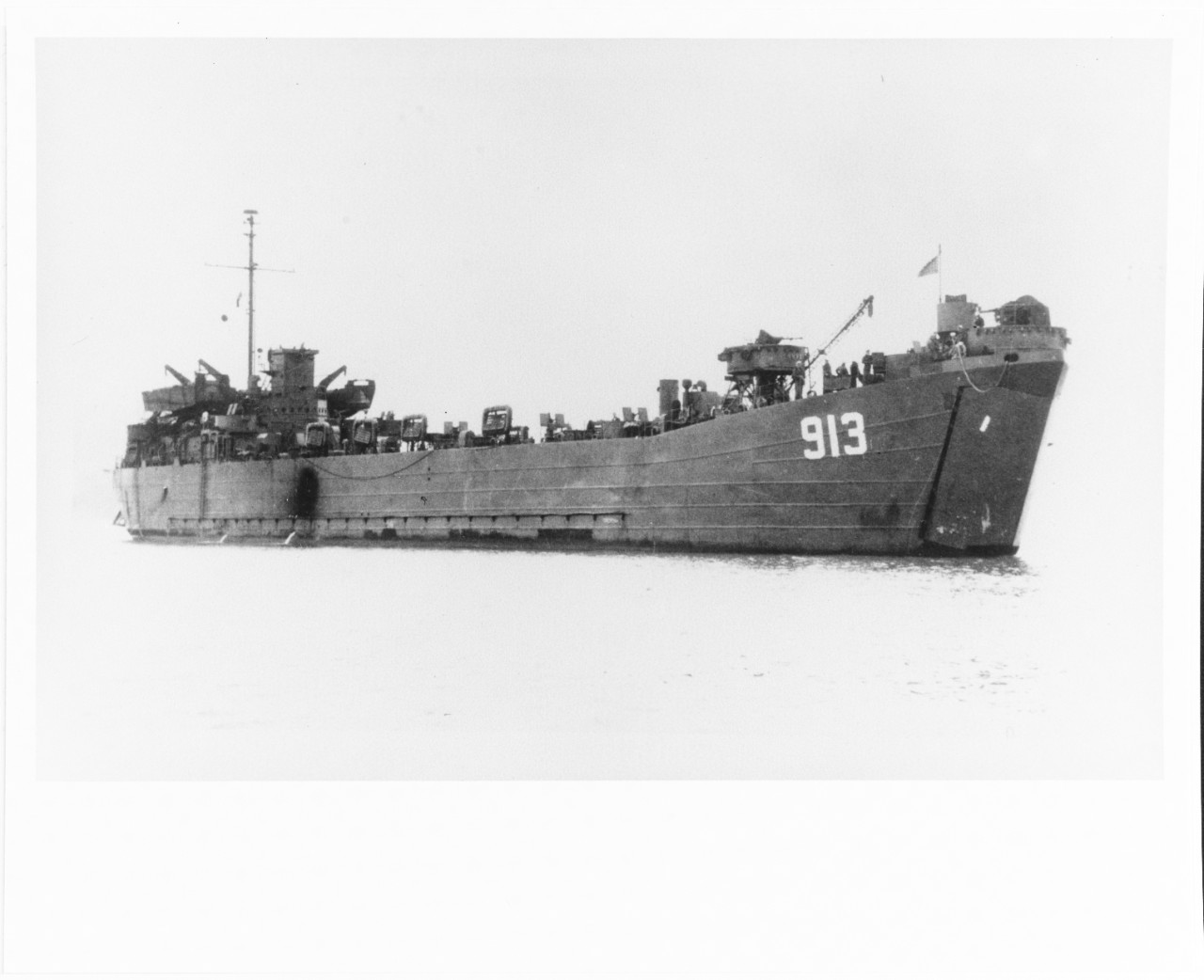
- USS LST-913 in San Francisco Bay, c. 1945–1946.

History

United States
- Name: LST-913
- Builder: Bethlehem-Hingham Shipyard, Hingham, Massachusetts
- Yard number: 3383
- Laid down: 15 March 1944
- Launched: 26 April 1944
- Commissioned: 23 May 1944
- Decommissioned: 16 July 1946
- Stricken: 14 March 1947
- Identification: Hull symbol: LST-913; Code letters: NVPS
- Honors and awards: 3 × battle star
- Fate: Sold for operation, 18 June 1948

General characteristics
- Class & type: LST-542-class tank landing ship
- Displacement: 1,625 long tons (1,651 t) (light); 4,080 long tons (4,145 t) (full (seagoing draft with 1,675 short tons (1,520 t) load); 2,366 long tons (2,404 t) (beaching)
- Length: 328 ft (100 m) oa
- Beam: 50 ft (15 m)
- Draft: Unloaded: 2 ft 4 in (0.71 m) forward; 7 ft 6 in (2.29 m) aft; Full load: 8 ft 3 in (2.51 m) forward; 14 ft 1 in (4.29 m) aft; Landing with 500 short tons (450 t) load: 3 ft 11 in (1.19 m) forward; 9 ft 10 in (3.00 m) aft; Limiting 11 ft 2 in (3.40 m); Maximum navigation 14 ft 1 in (4.29 m)
- Installed power: 2 × 900 hp (670 kW) Electro-Motive Diesel 12-567A diesel engines; 1,800 shp (1,300 kW)
- Propulsion: 1 × Falk main reduction gears; 2 × Propellers
- Speed: 11.6 kn (21.5 km/h; 13.3 mph)
- Range: 24,000 nmi (44,000 km; 28,000 mi) at 9 kn (17 km/h; 10 mph) while displacing 3,960 long tons (4,024 t)
- Boats & landing craft carried: 2 x LCVPs
- Capacity: 1,600–1,900 short tons (3,200,000–3,800,000 lb; 1,500,000–1,700,000 kg) cargo depending on mission
- Troops: 16 officers, 147 enlisted men
- Complement: 13 officers, 104 enlisted men
- Armament: Varied, ultimate armament; 2 × twin 40 mm (1.57 in) Bofors guns; 4 × single 40 mm Bofors guns; 12 × 20 mm (0.79 in) Oerlikon cannons

Service record
- Part of: LST Flotilla 36
- Operations: Invasion of southern France (15 August–25 September 1944); Leyte landings (5–18 November 1944); Assault and occupation of Okinawa Gunto (26–30 June 1945)
- Awards: American Campaign Medal; European–African–Middle Eastern Campaign Medal; Asiatic–Pacific Campaign Medal; World War II Victory Medal; Navy Occupation Service Medal w/Asia Clasp; Philippine Republic Presidential Unit Citation; Philippine Liberation Medal

USS LST-913 was an LST-542-class tank landing ship in the United States Navy. Like many of her class, she was not named and is properly referred to by her hull designation.

== Construction ==
LST-913 was laid down on 15 March 1944, at Hingham, Massachusetts, by the Bethlehem-Hingham Shipyard; launched on 26 April 1944; and commissioned on 23 May 1944.

== Service history ==
During World War II, LST-913 was assigned to the European theater and participated in the invasion of southern France in August and September 1944. She was then assigned to the Asiatic-Pacific theater and took part in the Leyte landings in November 1944, and the assault and occupation of Okinawa Gunto in June 1945.

Following the war, LST-913 performed occupation duty in the Far East until mid-December 1945. She returned to the United States and was decommissioned on 16 July 1946, and struck from the Navy list on 14 March 1947. On 18 June 1948, the ship was sold to the Humble Oil and Refining Co., Houston, Texas, for operation.

== Awards ==
LST-913 earned three battle star for World War II service.

== Bibliography ==
Online resources

- "LST-913". Dictionary of American Naval Fighting Ships. Naval History and Heritage Command. This article incorporates text from this source, which is in the public domain.
- "Bethlehem-Hingham, Hingham MA". www.ShipbuildingHistory.com. 11 August 2011.
- "USS LST-913". NavSource. 26 September 2015.
