= USS LST-978 =

1945 LST-542-class tank landing ship

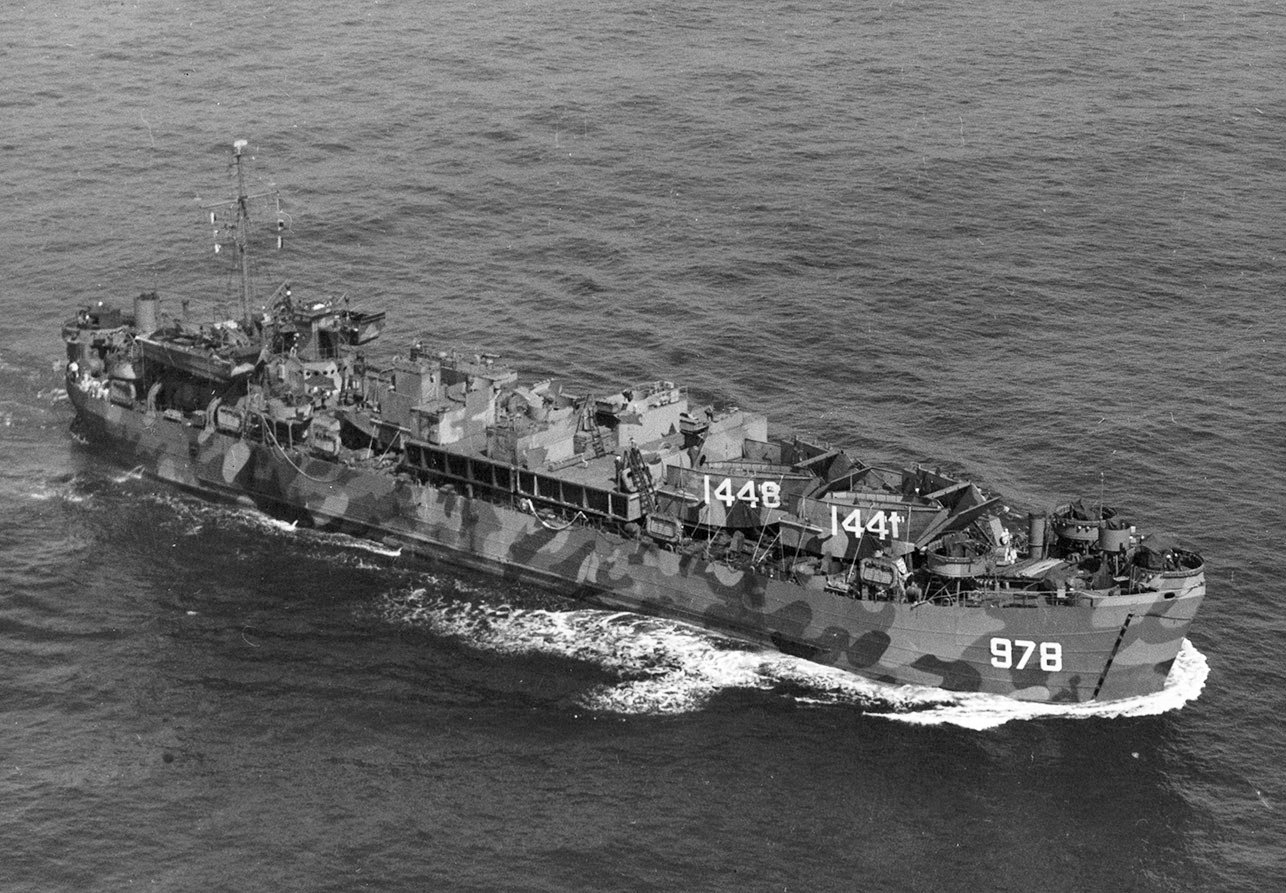
- USS LST-978 under way, 1 April 1945, in the Atlantic Ocean bound for the Pacific via the Panama Canal with disassembled landing craft LCT-1441 and LCT-1448 on deck.

History

United States
- Name: LST-978
- Builder: Bethlehem-Hingham Shipyard, Hingham, Massachusetts
- Yard number: 3448
- Laid down: 15 December 1944
- Launched: 20 January 1945
- Sponsored by: Mrs. Anna H. Phelan
- Commissioned: 15 February 1945
- Decommissioned: 6 June 1946
- Stricken: 3 July 1946
- Identification: Hull symbol: LST-978; Code letters: NKXN
- Fate: Sold for scrapping, 10 December 1947

General characteristics
- Class & type: LST-542-class tank landing ship
- Displacement: 1,625 long tons (1,651 t) (light); 4,080 long tons (4,145 t) (full (seagoing draft with 1,675 short tons (1,520 t) load); 2,366 long tons (2,404 t) (beaching)
- Length: 328 ft (100 m) oa
- Beam: 50 ft (15 m)
- Draft: Unloaded: 2 ft 4 in (0.71 m) forward; 7 ft 6 in (2.29 m) aft; Full load: 8 ft 3 in (2.51 m) forward; 14 ft 1 in (4.29 m) aft; Landing with 500 short tons (450 t) load: 3 ft 11 in (1.19 m) forward; 9 ft 10 in (3.00 m) aft; Limiting 11 ft 2 in (3.40 m); Maximum navigation 14 ft 1 in (4.29 m)
- Installed power: 2 × 900 hp (670 kW) Electro-Motive Diesel 12-567A diesel engines; 1,800 shp (1,300 kW)
- Propulsion: 1 × Falk main reduction gears; 2 × Propellers
- Speed: 11.6 kn (21.5 km/h; 13.3 mph)
- Range: 24,000 nmi (44,000 km; 28,000 mi) at 9 kn (17 km/h; 10 mph) while displacing 3,960 long tons (4,024 t)
- Boats & landing craft carried: 2 x LCVPs
- Capacity: 1,600–1,900 short tons (3,200,000–3,800,000 lb; 1,500,000–1,700,000 kg) cargo depending on mission
- Troops: 16 officers, 147 enlisted men
- Complement: 13 officers, 104 enlisted men
- Armament: Varied, ultimate armament; 2 × twin 40 mm (1.57 in) Bofors guns; 4 × single 40 mm Bofors guns; 12 × 20 mm (0.79 in) Oerlikon cannons

Service record
- Awards: American Campaign Medal; Asiatic–Pacific Campaign Medal; World War II Victory Medal; Navy Occupation Service Medal w/Asia Clasp

USS LST-978 was an LST-542-class tank landing ship in the United States Navy. Like many of her class, she was not named and is properly referred to by her hull designation.

== Construction ==
LST-978 was laid down on 15 December 1944, at Hingham, Massachusetts, by the Bethlehem-Hingham Shipyard; launched on 20 January 1945; sponsored by Mrs. Anna H. Phelan; and commissioned on 15 February 1945.

== Service history ==
Following World War II, LST-978 performed occupation duty in the Far East until mid-December 1945. She returned to the United States and was decommissioned on 6 June 1946, and struck from the Navy list on 3 July, that same year. On 10 December 1947, the ship was sold to the Salco Iron & Metal Co., for scrapping.

== Bibliography ==
Online resources

- "LST-978". Dictionary of American Naval Fighting Ships. Naval History and Heritage Command. This article incorporates text from this source, which is in the public domain.
- "Bethlehem-Hingham, Hingham MA". ShipbuildingHistory.com. 11 August 2011.
- "USS LST-978". NavSource. 26 August 2016.
