= USS LST-973 =

1944 LST-542-class tank landing ship

History

United States
- Name: LST-973
- Builder: Bethlehem-Hingham Shipyard, Hingham, Massachusetts
- Yard number: 3443
- Laid down: 25 November 1944
- Launched: 27 December 1944
- Commissioned: 27 January 1945
- Decommissioned: 24 May 1946
- Stricken: 29 September 1947
- Identification: Hull symbol: LST-973; Code letters: NKKP
- Fate: Transferred to US Army custody; Reinstated in the Naval Register, 6 September 1950
- Commissioned: 6 September 1950
- Decommissioned: 7 November 1951
- Stricken: 20 November 1951
- Honors and awards: 4 × battle stars
- Fate: Transferred to France, 7 November 1951

France
- Name: Golo
- Acquired: 7 November 1951
- Stricken: 1960
- Identification: Hull symbol: LST-973; Code letters: FADC
- Fate: Sold for scrapping, 1959

General characteristics
- Class & type: LST-542-class tank landing ship
- Displacement: 1,625 long tons (1,651 t) (light); 4,080 long tons (4,145 t) (full (seagoing draft with 1,675 short tons (1,520 t) load); 2,366 long tons (2,404 t) (beaching)
- Length: 328 ft (100 m) oa
- Beam: 50 ft (15 m)
- Draft: Unloaded: 2 ft 4 in (0.71 m) forward; 7 ft 6 in (2.29 m) aft; Full load: 8 ft 3 in (2.51 m) forward; 14 ft 1 in (4.29 m) aft; Landing with 500 short tons (450 t) load: 3 ft 11 in (1.19 m) forward; 9 ft 10 in (3.00 m) aft; Limiting 11 ft 2 in (3.40 m); Maximum navigation 14 ft 1 in (4.29 m)
- Installed power: 2 × 900 hp (670 kW) Electro-Motive Diesel 12-567A diesel engines; 1,800 shp (1,300 kW)
- Propulsion: 1 × Falk main reduction gears; 2 × Propellers
- Speed: 11.6 kn (21.5 km/h; 13.3 mph)
- Range: 24,000 nmi (44,000 km; 28,000 mi) at 9 kn (17 km/h; 10 mph) while displacing 3,960 long tons (4,024 t)
- Boats & landing craft carried: 2 x LCVPs
- Capacity: 1,600–1,900 short tons (3,200,000–3,800,000 lb; 1,500,000–1,700,000 kg) cargo depending on mission
- Troops: 16 officers, 147 enlisted men
- Complement: 13 officers, 104 enlisted men
- Armament: Varied, ultimate armament; 2 × twin 40 mm (1.57 in) Bofors guns; 4 × single 40 mm Bofors guns; 12 × 20 mm (0.79 in) Oerlikon cannons

Service record
- Awards: American Campaign Medal; Asiatic–Pacific Campaign Medal; World War II Victory Medal; Navy Occupation Service Medal w/Asia Clasp

USS LST-973 was an LST-542-class tank landing ship in the United States Navy. Like many of her class, she was not named and is properly referred to by her hull designation.

== Construction ==
LST-973 was laid down on 25 November 1944, at Hingham, Massachusetts, by the Bethlehem-Hingham Shipyard; launched on 27 December 1944; and commissioned on 27 January 1945.

== Service history ==
Following World War II, LST-973 performed occupation duty in the Far East until early February 1946. She was decommissioned on 24 May 1946, and transferred to the US Army. The ship was struck from the Navy list on 29 September 1947, but reinstated on 6 September 1950, for service during the Korean War. Decommissioned again on 7 November 1951, LST-973 was transferred to the French Navy that same date. She was struck from the Navy list for the second time on 20 November 1951.

== Awards ==
LST-973 earned four battle stars one award of the Navy Unit Commendation for Korean service.

== Bibliography ==
Online resources

- "LST-973". Dictionary of American Naval Fighting Ships. Naval History and Heritage Command. This article incorporates text from this source, which is in the public domain.
- "Bethlehem-Hingham, Hingham MA". www.ShipbuildingHistory.com. 11 August 2011.
- "USS LST-973". NavSource. 27 May 2016.
