= USS LST-972 =

1944 LST-542-class tank landing ship

History

United States
- Name: LST-972
- Builder: Bethlehem-Hingham Shipyard, Hingham, Massachusetts
- Yard number: 3442
- Laid down: 21 November 1944
- Launched: 22 December 1944
- Commissioned: 22 January 1945
- Decommissioned: 25 June 1946
- Stricken: 15 August 1946
- Identification: Hull symbol: LST-972; Code letters: NKKK
- Fate: Sold by MARAD for operation, 29 May 1949

United States
- Name: Tucupita
- Owner: Texas Petro Company
- Acquired: 29 May 1949
- Fate: Converted to a dumb drilling barge

General characteristics
- Class & type: LST-542-class tank landing ship
- Displacement: 1,625 long tons (1,651 t) (light); 4,080 long tons (4,145 t) (full (seagoing draft with 1,675 short tons (1,520 t) load); 2,366 long tons (2,404 t) (beaching)
- Length: 328 ft (100 m) oa
- Beam: 50 ft (15 m)
- Draft: Unloaded: 2 ft 4 in (0.71 m) forward; 7 ft 6 in (2.29 m) aft; Full load: 8 ft 3 in (2.51 m) forward; 14 ft 1 in (4.29 m) aft; Landing with 500 short tons (450 t) load: 3 ft 11 in (1.19 m) forward; 9 ft 10 in (3.00 m) aft; Limiting 11 ft 2 in (3.40 m); Maximum navigation 14 ft 1 in (4.29 m)
- Installed power: 2 × 900 hp (670 kW) Electro-Motive Diesel 12-567A diesel engines; 1,800 shp (1,300 kW)
- Propulsion: 1 × Falk main reduction gears; 2 × Propellers
- Speed: 11.6 kn (21.5 km/h; 13.3 mph)
- Range: 24,000 nmi (44,000 km; 28,000 mi) at 9 kn (17 km/h; 10 mph) while displacing 3,960 long tons (4,024 t)
- Boats & landing craft carried: 2 x LCVPs
- Capacity: 1,600–1,900 short tons (3,200,000–3,800,000 lb; 1,500,000–1,700,000 kg) cargo depending on mission
- Troops: 16 officers, 147 enlisted men
- Complement: 13 officers, 104 enlisted men
- Armament: Varied, ultimate armament; 2 × twin 40 mm (1.57 in) Bofors guns; 4 × single 40 mm Bofors guns; 12 × 20 mm (0.79 in) Oerlikon cannons

Service record
- Awards: American Campaign Medal; Asiatic–Pacific Campaign Medal; World War II Victory Medal; Navy Occupation Service Medal w/Asia Clasp

USS LST-972 was an LST-542-class tank landing ship in the United States Navy. Like many of her class, she was not named and is properly referred to by her hull designation.

== Construction ==
LST-972 was laid down on 21 November 1944, at Hingham, Massachusetts, by the Bethlehem-Hingham Shipyard; launched on 22 December 1944; sponsored by Mrs. Margaret Avery; and commissioned on 22 January 1945.

== Service history ==
During World War II, LST-972 was assigned to the Asiatic-Pacific theater and participated the assault and occupation of Okinawa Gunto in May and June 1945.

Following World War II, LST-972 performed occupation duty in the Far East until early February 1946. She was decommissioned on 25 June 1946, and struck from the Navy list on 15 August, that same year. On 29 May 1947, the ship was transferred to the Maritime Administration (MARAD) for disposal. On 29 May 1949, she was sold by MARAD to the Texas Petro Company and renamed Tucupita.

== Bibliography ==
Online resources

- "LST-972". Dictionary of American Naval Fighting Ships. Naval History and Heritage Command. This article incorporates text from this source, which is in the public domain.
- "Bethlehem-Hingham, Hingham MA". ShipbuildingHistory.com. 11 August 2011.
- "USS LST-972". NavSource. 27 May 2016.
