= USS Foss =

Buckley-class destroyer escort

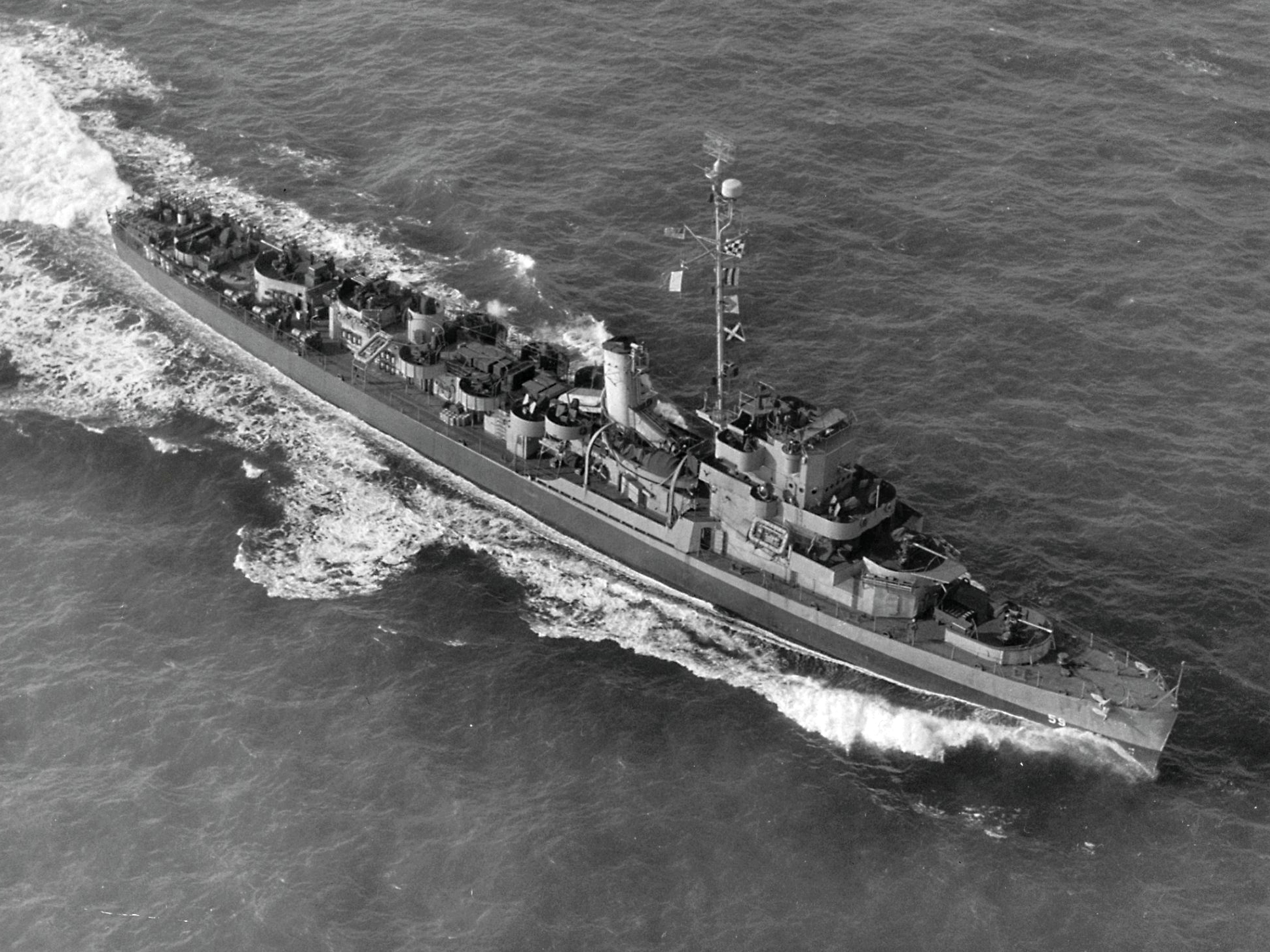
- USS Foss on 8 December 1944

History

United States
- Name: USS Foss
- Namesake: Rodney Shelton Foss
- Ordered: 1942
- Builder: Bethlehem Hingham Shipyard
- Laid down: 31 December 1942
- Launched: 10 April 1943
- Commissioned: 23 July 1943
- Decommissioned: 30 October 1957
- Stricken: 1 November 1965
- Honors and awards: 1 battle star (Korea)
- Fate: Sunk as target, 6 September 1966

General characteristics
- Class & type: Buckley-class destroyer escort
- Displacement: 1,400 long tons (1,422 t) light; 1,740 long tons (1,768 t) standard
- Length: 306 ft (93 m)
- Beam: 37 ft (11 m)
- Draft: 9 ft 6 in (2.90 m) standard; 11 ft 3 in (3.43 m) full load
- Propulsion: 2 × boilers; General Electric turbo-electric drive; 12,000 shp (8.9 MW); 2 × solid manganese-bronze 3,600 lb (1,600 kg) 3-bladed propellers, 8 ft 6 in (2.59 m) diameter, 7 ft 7 in (2.31 m) pitch; 2 × rudders; 359 tons fuel oil
- Speed: 23 knots (43 km/h; 26 mph)
- Range: 3,700 nmi (6,900 km) at 15 kn (28 km/h; 17 mph); 6,000 nmi (11,000 km) at 12 kn (22 km/h; 14 mph)
- Complement: 15 officers, 198 men
- Armament: 3 × 3"/50 caliber guns; 1 × quad 1.1"/75 caliber gun; 8 × single 20 mm guns; 1 × triple 21 inch (533 mm) torpedo tubes; 1 × Hedgehog anti-submarine mortar; 8 × K-gun depth charge projectors; 2 × depth charge tracks

USS Foss (DE-59) was a Buckley-class destroyer escort of the United States Navy, in service from 1943 to 1957. She was sunk as a target in September 1966.

The ship was named for Rodney Shelton Foss, who was killed during the Japanese attack on Pearl Harbor. (Note: Foss was assigned to Patrol Squadron 11 (VP-11), and was killed when Japanese aircraft struck Naval Air Station Kaneohe Bay. He was one of the first fatalities in the attack.)

== History ==
Foss was launched on 10 April 1943 by Bethlehem-Hingham Shipyard, Hingham, Massachusetts; sponsored by Mrs. George R. Foss, mother of Ensign Foss; and commissioned on 23 July 1943.

=== 1943–1950 ===
Foss sailed from Boston on 22 September 1943 for the Netherlands West Indies to escort a tanker convoy back to New York. From New York, she put to sea once more on 13 October, again with a group of tankers and, after calling at Aruba, crossed the Atlantic to Dakar, Oran and Algiers, returning by way of Aruba and the Canal Zone to New York. Between 26 December and 9 October 1944, Foss operated on the New York-Derry convoy route, making seven voyages to build up forces in Europe for the Normandy invasion and to support the advance on the continent once the landings had been made.

Assigned to operational development activities in anti-submarine warfare, Foss sailed out of Washington, New London, Charleston, Norfolk, and ports in Florida during the next six years. She tested equipment for the Naval Research Laboratory and conducted operations under the direction of the Fleet Sonar School, the Anti-submarine Development Detachment, and the Operational Development Force. In 1946, she was equipped with ship/shore power conversion equipment, with which, during the winter of 1947–48, she provided Portland, Maine, with emergency electric power after normal power resources had failed because of forest fires and lack of rain. In August 1950, Foss took part in rocket experiments at Cape Canaveral, recording data after seaward firings.

=== 1950–1957 ===
Reassigned to the Pacific Fleet, Foss departed Norfolk on 29 September 1950, reaching San Diego on 11 October. Six days later, she sailed for duty in Korea, where her special ability to provide power to the shore was used at Chinnampo, Inchon, and Hŭngnam in November and December. She arrived at Ulsan Man on 25 December and remained until 18 August 1951, providing power for an Army unit stationed there.

Returning to San Diego on 10 September, Foss served in ordnance tests until 21 September, when she raised Pearl Harbor, her new home port. During the next five years, she operated locally in the Hawaiian Islands, as well as making two cruises on surveillance patrol through the islands of the Pacific Trust Territory and two tours of duty in the Far East. During her 1955 tour, she served as station ship at Hong Kong.

=== Decommissioning and fate ===
In June 1957, Foss returned to the west coast and was decommissioned and placed in reserve at Mare Island Naval Shipyard on 30 October 1957. On 6 September 1966, Foss was sunk as a target by USS Sabalo (SS-302) off the coast of California near San Diego.

== Awards ==
Foss received one battle star for Korean War service.
