= Bayside Airport =

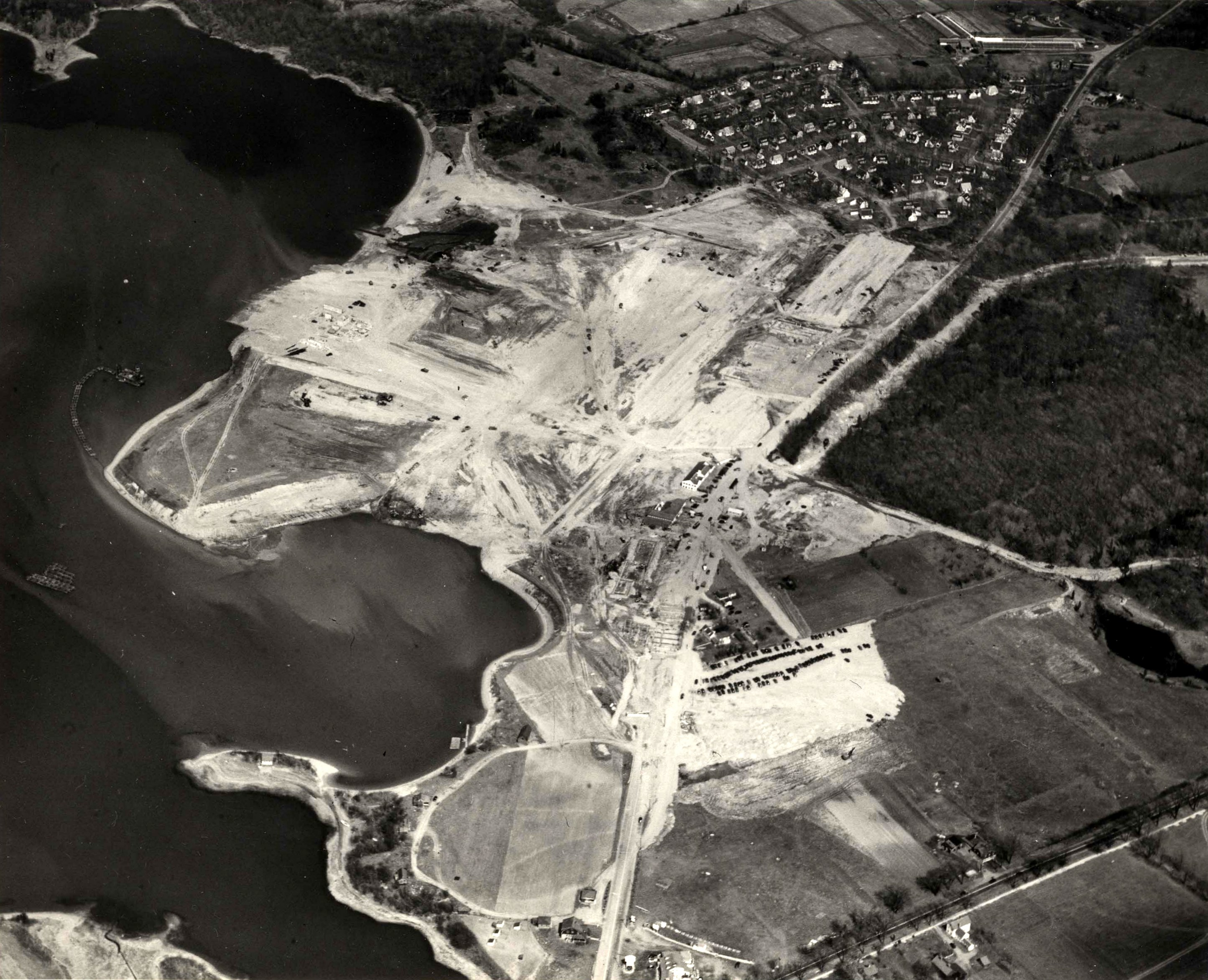
- Construction of the Hingham Shipyard, showing the former airport location
- IATA: none; ICAO: none

Summary
- Operator: Private
- Location: Hingham, Massachusetts
- Built: Unknown
- In use: 193?-1941
- Occupants: Private
- Elevation AMSL: 32 ft / 10 m
- Coordinates: 42°14′55.20″N 70°55′6.81″W
- Interactive map of Bayside Airport

Bayside Airport was an airfield operational from at least 1938 to 1941. The airfield was located alongside Hingham Bay in Hingham, Massachusetts. Following the Attack on Pearl Harbor, the land was appropriated into the Bethlehem Hingham Shipyard, which produced destroyer escorts in tandem with Fore River Shipyard until 1945.
