= Bethlehem Hingham Shipyard =

Shipyard in Massachusetts, US

Coordinates: 42°15′5.37″N 70°55′3.55″W

Bethlehem-Fairfield Shipyard, Inc.
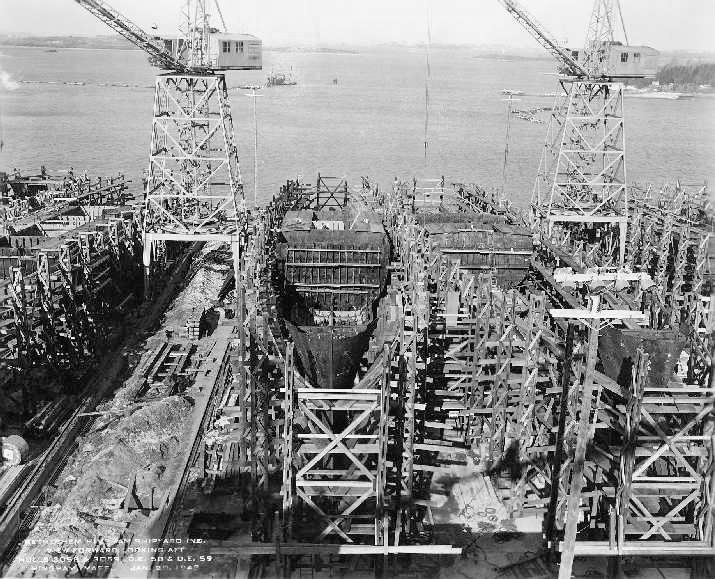
- HMS Calder (K349) under construction as USS Formoe (DE-58), with USS Foss (DE-59) on the right at the Bethlehem Hingham Shipyard.
- Industry: Shipbuilding
- Founded: December 1941; 84 years ago in Hewitts Cove, Weymouth Back River, Hingham, Massachusetts
- Defunct: 1945
- Number of employees: 23,000
- Parent: Bethlehem Shipbuilding Corporation

The Bethlehem Hingham Shipyard of Hingham, Massachusetts, was a shipyard in the United States from 1941 until 1945. Located on Weymouth Back River, it was owned by the Bethlehem Shipbuilding Company and operated by the nearby Fore River Shipyard. During the three and a half years that the yard was operational, it produced 277 ships, including a destroyer escort delivered in 23 days.

== History ==
Shortly before the entry of the United States into World War II, the United States Navy began designs on destroyer escorts and commissioned Bethlehem Steel to be the major contractor. Because Bethlehem's shipyards were operating at full capacity, there was need to build a new shipyard. A location for a shipyard was chosen in Hingham, Massachusetts, at the site of the former Bayside Airport. Within weeks of the attack on Pearl Harbor, a survey team arrived in Hingham and crews worked around the clock to clear 150 acres of land. After the land was cleared, a steel mill stretching a third of a mile was erected, and wooden cradles that would hold each ship were built. Sixteen ways were also constructed at the yard, which was managed by the nearby Fore River Shipyard.

Facing a lack of skilled labor, 400 shipbuilders were brought in to train a workforce that totaled 15,000 within a year. Included in this number were 2,500 women due to a lack of available men.

A simplified process was created to streamline how ships were constructed at the time. Steel would be first cut into patterns, numbered, and then welded together separate of the ship, building the ship from the ground up by this process. This enabled a construction rate of around six ships a month. As a result, the Navy ordered sixty ships to be delivered in 1943, a quota which was matched and exceeded when the yard produced ninety ships that year, for which it was awarded the Army-Navy "E" Award. The nearby Fore River Shipyard had earned the same honor the previous year.

Around this time, orders in the yard shifted from destroyer escorts to Landing Ship Tank craft, which were first delivered in 1944. The last ship delivered at the shipyard was LST 1080, which was delivered on 29 May 1945.

In 2017, the warehouse building (designated as Building #19) that had previously been headquarters of Building 19 (a discount retail outlet, which operated from the 1970s into the 2000s, which, at its peak, had about 20 stores throughout New England), was razed after becoming badly damaged due to years of neglect. Some of the timbers in the building were salvaged by a Massachusetts reclaimed lumber company and recycled into new products.
