= List of United States Navy LSTs =

A full list of United States Navy LSTs. The Landing Ship, Tanks (LSTs) built for the United States Navy during and immediately after World War II were only given an LST-number hull designation, but on 1 July 1955, county or Louisiana-parish names were assigned to those ships which remained in service. More recent LSTs were named on launching.

== By number ==
=== USS LST-1 – USS LST-84 ===
- USS LST-1
- USS LST-2
- USS LST-3
- USS LST-4
- USS LST-5
- USS LST-6
- USS LST-7
- USS LST-8
- USS LST-9
- USS LST-10 — converted to USS Achelous (ARL-1)
- USS LST-11
- USS LST-12
- USS LST-13
- USS LST-14 — converted to USS Varuna (AGP-5)
- USS LST-15 — converted to USS Phaon (ARB-3)
- USS LST-16
- USS LST-17
- USS LST-18
- USS LST-19
- USS LST-20
- USS LST-21
- USS LST-22
- USS LST-23
- USS LST-24
- USS LST-25
- USS LST-26
- USS LST-27
- USS LST-28
- USS LST-29
- USS LST-30
- USS Addison County (LST-31)
- USS Alameda County (LST-32)
- USS LST-33
- USS LST-34
- USS LST-35
- USS LST-36
- USS LST-37
- USS LST-38
- USS LST-39 — converted to YF-1079
- USS LST-40
- USS LST-41
- USS LST-42
- USS LST-43
- USS LST-44
- USS LST-45
- USS LST-46
- USS LST-47
- USS LST-48
- USS LST-49
- USS LST-50 — converted to USS ARB-13
- USS LST-51
- USS LST-52
- USS LST-53 — converted to USS APL-59
- USS LST-54
- USS LST-55
- USS LST-56
- USS Armstrong County (LST-57)
- USS LST-58
- USS LST-59
- USS Atchison County (LST-60)
- USS LST-61
- USS LST-62
- USS LST-63
- USS LST-64
- USS LST-65
- USS LST-66
- USS LST-67
- USS LST-68
- USS LST-69
- USS LST-70
- USS LST-71
- USS LST-72
- USS LST-73
- USS LST-74
- USS LST-75
- USS LST-76
- USS LST-77
- USS LST-78
- USS LST-79
- USS LST-80
- USS LST-81 — converted to USS ARL-5
- USS LST-82 — converted to USS ARL-6
- USS LST-83 — converted to USS Adonis (ARL-4)
- USS LST-84
- LST-85 – LST-116 — cancelled

=== USS LST-117 – USS LST-199 ===
- USS LST-117
- USS LST-118
- USS LST-119
- USS LST-120
- USS LST-121
- USS LST-122
- USS LST-123
- USS LST-124
- USS LST-125
- USS LST-126
- USS LST-127
- USS LST-128
- USS LST-129 — converted to USS Cohasset (IX-198)
- USS LST-130
- USS LST-131
- USS LST-132 — converted to USS Zeus (ARB-4)
- USS LST-133
- USS LST-134
- USS LST-135 — converted to USS Orestes (AGP-10)
- USS LST-136 — converted to USS Egeria (ARL-8)
- USS LST-137
- USS LST-138
- USS LST-139
- USS LST-140
- USS LST-141
- LST-142 – LST-156 — cancelled
- USS LST-157
- USS LST-158
- USS LST-159
- USS LST-160
- USS LST-161
- USS LST-162
- USS LST-163
- USS LST-164
- USS LST-165
- USS LST-166
- USS LST-167
- USS LST-168
- USS LST-169
- USS LST-170
- USS LST-171
- USS LST-172
- USS LST-173
- USS LST-174
- USS LST-175
- USS LST-176
- USS LST-177
- USS LST-178
- USS LST-179
- USS LST-180
- USS LST-181
- LST-182 – LST-196 — cancelled
- USS LST-197
- USS LST-198
- USS LST-199

=== USS LST-200 – USS LST-299 ===
- USS LST-200
- USS LST-201 — converted to USS Pontus (AGP-20)
- USS LST-202
- USS LST-203
- USS LST-204
- USS LST-205
- USS LST-206
- USS LST-207
- USS LST-208
- USS Bamberg County (LST-209)
- USS LST-210
- USS LST-211
- USS LST-212
- USS LST-213
- USS LST-214
- USS LST-215
- USS LST-216
- USS LST-217
- USS LST-218
- USS LST-219
- USS LST-220
- USS LST-221
- USS LST-222
- USS LST-223
- USS LST-224
- USS LST-225
- USS LST-226
- USS LST-227
- USS LST-228
- USS LST-229
- USS LST-230
- USS LST-231 — converted to USS Atlas (ARL-7)
- LST-232 – LST-236 — cancelled
- USS LST-237
- USS LST-238
- USS LST-239
- USS LST-240
- USS LST-241
- USS LST-242
- USS LST-243
- USS LST-244
- USS LST-245
- USS LST-246
- USS LST-247
- LST-248 – LST-260 — cancelled
- USS LST-261
- USS LST-262
- USS Benton County (LST-263)
- USS LST-264
- USS LST-265
- USS Benzie County (LST-266)
- USS LST-267
- USS LST-268
- USS LST-269
- USS LST-270
- USS LST-271
- USS LST-272
- USS LST-273 — repatriated Japanese prisoners from Featherston prisoner of war camp
- USS LST-274
- USS LST-275 — repatriated Japanese prisoners from Featherston prisoner of war camp
- USS LST-276
- USS LST-277
- USS LST-278 — converted to USS Seaward (IX-209)
- USS Berkeley County (LST-279)
- USS LST-280
- USS LST-281
- USS LST-282
- USS LST-283
- USS LST-284
- USS LST-285
- USS LST-286
- USS LST-287
- USS Berkshire County (LST-288)
- USS LST-289
- USS LST-290
- USS LST-291
- USS LST-292
- USS LST-293
- USS LST-294
- USS LST-295
- LST-296 – LST-300 — cancelled
- USS LST-297
- USS LST-298
- USS LST-299

=== USS LST-300 – USS LST-399 ===
- USS LST-300 — cancelled
- USS LST-301
- USS LST-302
- USS LST-303
- USS LST-304
- USS LST-305
- USS Bernalillo County (LST-306)
- USS LST-307
- USS LST-308
- USS LST-309
- USS LST-310 — conversion to USS Aeolus (ARL-42) cancelled
- USS LST-311
- USS LST-312
- USS LST-313
- USS LST-314
- USS LST-315
- USS LST-316 — conversion to USS Cerberus (ARL-43) cancelled
- USS LST-317 — conversion to USS Conus (ARL-44) cancelled
- USS LST-318
- USS LST-319
- USS LST-320
- USS LST-321
- USS LST-322
- USS LST-323
- USS LST-324
- USS LST-325, the only restored, fully functional LST, now a museum ship with its home port in Evansville, Indiana.
- USS LST-326
- USS LST-327
- USS LST-328 — converted to USS Oceanus (ARB-2)
- USS LST-329 — converted to USS Aristaeus (ARB-1)
- USS LST-330 — converted to USS Portunus (AGP-4)
- USS LST-331
- USS LST-332 — conversion to USS Feronia (ARL-45) cancelled
- USS LST-333
- USS LST-334
- USS LST-335
- USS LST-336
- USS LST-337
- USS LST-338
- USS LST-339
- USS LST-340 — converted to USS Spark (IX-196)
- USS LST-341
- USS LST-342
- USS LST-343
- USS Blanco County (LST-344)
- USS LST-345
- USS LST-346
- USS LST-347
- USS LST-348
- USS LST-349
- USS LST-350 — conversion to USS Chandra (ARL-46) cancelled
- USS LST-351
- USS LST-352
- USS LST-353
- USS LST-354
- USS LST-355
- USS Bledsoe County (LST-356)
- USS LST-357
- USS LST-358
- USS LST-359
- USS LST-360
- USS LST-361
- USS LST-362
- USS LST-363
- USS LST-364
- USS LST-365
- USS LST-366
- USS LST-367
- USS LST-368
- USS LST-369
- USS LST-370
- USS LST-371
- USS LST-372
- USS LST-373
- USS LST-374 — conversion to USS Minerva (ARL-47) cancelled
- USS LST-375
- USS LST-376
- USS LST-377
- USS LST-378
- USS LST-379
- USS LST-380
- USS LST-381
- USS LST-382
- USS LST-383
- USS LST-384
- USS LST-385
- USS LST-386
- USS LST-387
- USS LST-388
- USS Boone County (LST-389)
- USS LST-390
- USS Bowman County (LST-391)
- USS LST-392
- USS LST-393
- USS LST-394
- USS LST-395
- USS LST-396
- USS LST-397
- USS LST-398
- USS LST-399 — converted to USS Seaward (IX-511)

=== USS LST-400 – USS LST-499 ===
- USS Bradley County (LST-400)
- USS LST-401
- USS LST-402
- USS LST-403
- USS LST-404
- USS LST-405
- USS LST-406
- USS LST-407
- USS LST-408
- USS LST-409
- USS LST-410
- USS LST-411
- USS LST-412
- USS LST-413 (HM LST-413) — Sent to UK; saw no USN service
- USS LST-414
- USS LST-415
- USS LST-416
- USS LST-417
- USS LST-418
- USS LST-419
- USS LST-420
- USS LST-421
- USS LST-422
- USS LST-423
- USS LST-424
- USS LST-425
- USS LST-426
- USS LST-427
- USS LST-428
- USS LST-429
- USS LST-430
- LST-431 – LST-445 — cancelled
- USS LST-446
- USS LST-447
- USS LST-448
- USS LST-449
- USS LST-450
- USS LST-451
- USS LST-452
- USS LST-453 — converted to USS Remus (ARL-40)
- USS LST-454
- USS LST-455 — converted to USS Achilles (ARL-41)
- USS LST-456
- USS LST-457
- USS LST-458
- USS LST-459
- USS LST-460
- USS LST-461
- USS LST-462
- USS LST-463
- USS LST-464
- USS LST-465
- USS LST-466
- USS LST-467
- USS LST-468
- USS LST-469
- USS LST-470
- USS LST-471
- USS LST-472
- USS LST-473
- USS LST-474
- USS LST-475
- USS LST-476
- USS LST-477
- USS LST-478
- USS LST-479
- USS LST-480
- USS LST-481
- USS Branch County (LST-482)
- USS Brewster County (LST-483)
- USS LST-484
- USS LST-485
- USS LST-486
- USS LST-487
- USS LST-488
- USS LST-489 — converted to USS Amycus (ARL-2)
- USS LST-490 — converted to USS Agenor (ARL-3)
- USS LST-491
- USS LST-492
- USS LST-493
- USS LST-494
- USS LST-495
- USS LST-496
- USS LST-497
- USS LST-498
- USS LST-499

=== USS LST-500 – USS LST-599 ===
- USS LST-500
- USS LST-501
- USS LST-502
- USS LST-503
- USS Buchanan County (LST-504)
- USS LST-505
- USS LST-506
- USS LST-507
- USS LST-508
- USS Bulloch County (LST-509)
- USS Buncombe County (LST-510)
- USS LST-511
- USS Burnett County (LST-512)
- USS LST-513 — converted to USS Endymion (ARL-9)
- USS LST-514 — converted to USS Midas (ARB-5)
- USS Caddo Parish (LST-515)
- USS Calaveras County (LST-516)
- USS LST-517
- USS LST-518 — converted to USS Nestor (ARB-6)
- USS Calhoun County (LST-519)
- USS LST-520
- USS Cape May County (LST-521)
- USS LST-522
- USS LST-523
- USS LST-524
- USS Caroline County (LST-525)
- USS LST-526
- USS Cassia County (LST-527)
- USS Catahoula Parish (LST-528)
- USS Cayuga County (LST-529)
- USS LST-530
- USS LST-531
- USS Chase County (LST-532)
- USS Cheboygan County (LST-533)
- USS LST-534
- USS LST-535
- USS LST-536
- USS LST-537
- USS LST-538
- USS LST-539
- USS LST-540
- USS LST-541
- USS Chelan County (LST-542)
- USS LST-543
- USS LST-544
- USS LST-545
- USS LST-546
- USS LST-547
- USS LST-548
- USS LST-549
- USS LST-550
- USS Chesterfield County (LST-551)
- USS LST-552
- USS LST-553
- USS LST-554
- USS LST-555
- USS LST-556
- USS LST-557
- USS LST-558
- USS LST-559
- USS LST-560
- USS Chittenden County (LST-561)
- USS LST-562
- USS LST-563
- USS LST-564
- USS LST-565
- USS LST-566
- USS LST-567
- USS LST-568
- USS LST-569
- USS LST-570
- USS LST-571
- USS LST-572
- USS LST-573
- USS LST-574
- USS LST-575, converted to USS Wythe (APB-41)
- USS LST-576
- USS LST-577
- USS LST-578
- USS LST-579
- USS LST-580
- USS LST-581
- USS LST-582
- USS Churchill County (LST-583)
- USS LST-584
- USS LST-585
- USS LST-586
- USS LST-587
- USS LST-588
- USS LST-589
- USS LST-590
- USS LST-591
- USS LST-592
- USS LST-593
- USS LST-594
- USS LST-595
- USS LST-596
- USS LST-597
- USS LST-598
- USS LST-599

=== USS LST-600 – USS LST-699 ===
- USS LST-600
- USS Clarke County (LST-601)
- USS Clearwater County (LST-602)
- USS Coconino County (LST-603)
- USS LST-604 — converted to USS Silenus (AGP-11)
- USS LST-605
- USS LST-606
- USS LST-607
- USS LST-608
- USS LST-609
- USS LST-610
- USS Crook County (LST-611)
- USS LST-612
- USS LST-613
- USS LST-614
- USS LST-615
- USS LST-616
- USS LST-617
- USS LST-618
- USS LST-619
- USS LST-620
- USS LST-621
- USS LST-622
- USS LST-623
- USS LST-624
- USS LST-625
- USS LST-626
- USS LST-627
- USS LST-628
- USS LST-629
- USS LST-630
- USS LST-631
- USS LST-632
- USS LST-633
- USS LST-634
- USS LST-635
- USS LST-636
- USS LST-637
- USS LST-638
- USS LST-639
- USS LST-640
- USS LST-641
- USS LST-642
- USS LST-643
- USS LST-644 — converted to USS Minos (ARL-14)
- USS LST-645 — converted to USS Minotaur (ARL-15)
- USS LST-646
- USS LST-647
- USS LST-648
- USS LST-649
- USS LST-650 — converted to USS Pandemus (ARL-18)
- USS LST-651
- USS LST-652
- USS LST-653
- USS LST-654
- USS LST-655
- USS LST-656
- USS LST-657
- USS LST-658
- USS LST-659
- USS LST-660
- USS LST-661
- USS LST-662
- USS LST-663
- USS LST-664
- USS LST-665
- USS LST-666
- USS LST-667
- USS LST-668
- USS LST-669
- USS LST-670
- USS LST-671
- USS LST-672
- USS LST-673
- USS LST-674
- USS LST-675
- USS LST-676, converted to USS Yavapai (APB-42)
- USS LST-677 — converted to USS Yolo (APB-43)
- USS LST-678 converted to USS Presque Isle (APB-44)
- USS LST-679
- USS LST-680
- USS LST-681
- USS LST-682
- USS LST-683
- USS LST-684
- USS Curry County (LST-685)
- USS LST-686
- USS LST-687
- USS LST-688
- USS Daggett County (LST-689)
- USS LST-690
- USS LST-691
- USS Daviess County (LST-692)
- USS LST-693
- USS LST-694
- USS LST-695
- USS LST-696
- USS LST-697
- USS LST-698
- USS LST-699

=== USS LST-700 – USS LST-799 ===
- USS LST-700
- USS LST-701
- USS LST-702
- USS LST-703
- USS LST-704
- USS LST-705
- USS LST-706
- USS LST-707
- USS LST-708
- USS LST-709
- USS LST-710 — converted to USS Accomac (APB-49)
- USS LST-711
- USS LST-712
- USS LST-713
- USS LST-714
- USS DeKalb County (LST-715)
- USS LST-716
- USS LST-717
- USS LST-718
- USS LST-719
- USS LST-720
- USS LST-721
- USS Dodge County (LST-722)
- USS LST-723
- USS LST-724
- USS LST-725
- USS LST-726
- USS LST-727
- USS LST-728
- USS LST-729
- USS LST-730
- USS Douglas County (LST-731)
- USS LST-732
- USS LST-733
- USS LST-734
- USS Dukes County (LST-735)
- USS LST-736
- USS LST-737
- USS LST-738
- USS LST-739
- USS LST-740
- USS LST-741
- USS Dunn County (LST-742)
- USS LST-743
- USS LST-744
- USS LST-745
- USS LST-746
- USS LST-747
- USS LST-748
- USS LST-749
- USS LST-750
- USS LST-751
- USS LST-752
- USS LST-753
- USS LST-754
- USS LST-755
- USS LST-756
- USS LST-757
- USS Duval County (LST-758)
- USS Eddy County (LST-759)
- USS LST-760
- USS Esmeraldo County (LST-761)
- USS Floyd County (LST-762)
- USS LST-763
- USS LST-764
- USS LST-765
- USS LST-766
- USS LST-767
- USS LST-768
- USS LST-769
- USS LST-770
- USS LST-771
- USS Ford County (LST-772)
- USS LST-773 — converted to USS Antigone (AGP-16)
- USS LST-774
- USS LST-775
- USS LST-776
- USS LST-777
- USS LST-778
- USS LST-779
- USS LST-780
- USS LST-781
- USS LST-782
- USS LST-783
- USS Garfield County (LST-784)
- USS LST-785
- USS Garrett County (LST-786)
- USS LST-787
- USS LST-788
- USS LST-789
- USS LST-790
- USS LST-791
- USS LST-792
- USS LST-793
- USS Gibson County (LST-794)
- USS LST-795
- USS LST-796
- USS LST-797
- USS LST-798
- USS Greer County (LST-799)

=== USS LST-800 – USS LST-899 ===
- USS LST-800
- USS LST-801
- USS Hamilton County (LST-802)
- USS Hampden County (LST-803)
- USS LST-804
- USS LST-805
- USS LST-806
- USS LST-807
- USS LST-808
- USS LST-809
- USS LST-810
- USS LST-811
- USS LST-812
- USS LST-813
- USS LST-814
- USS LST-815
- USS LST-816
- USS LST-817
- USS LST-818
- USS Hampshire County (LST-819)
- USS LST-820
- USS Harnett County (LST-821), later AGP-821
- USNS Harris County (T-LST-822)
- USS LST-823
- USS Henry County (LST-824)
- USS Hickman County (LST-825)
- USS LST-826
- USS Hillsborough County (LST-827)
- USS LST-828
- USS LST-829
- USS LST-830
- USS LST-831
- USS LST-832 "The Mad Hooligan"
- USS LST-833
- USS LST-834
- USS Hillsdale County (LST-835)
- USS Holmes County (LST-836)
- USS LST-837
- USS Hunterdon County (LST-838), later AGP-838
- USS Iredell County (LST-839)
- USS Iron County (LST-840)
- USS LST-841
- USS LST-842
- USS LST-843
- USS LST-844
- USS Jefferson County (LST-845)
- USS Jennings County (LST-846)
- USS LST-847
- USS Jerome County (LST-848)
- USS Johnson County (LST-849)
- USS Juniata County (LST-850)
- USS LST-851
- USS LST-852 — converted to USS Satyr (ARL-23)
- USS Kane County (LST-853)
- USS Kemper County (LST-854)
- USS Kent County (LST-855)
- USS LST-856
- USS King County (LST-857)
- USS LST-858 — converted to USS Stentor (ARL-26)
- USS Lafayette County (LST-859)
- USS LST-860
- USS LST-861
- USS LST-862
- USS LST-863
- USS LST-864
- USS LST-865
- USS LST-866
- USS LST-867
- USS LST-868
- USS LST-869
- USS LST-870
- USS LST-871
- USS LST-872
- USS LST-873
- USS LST-874
- USS LST-875
- USS LST-876
- USS LST-877
- USS LST-878
- USS LST-879
- USS Lake County (LST-880)
- USS LST-881
- USS LST-882
- USS La Moure County (LST-883)
- USS LST-884
- USS LST-885
- USS LST-886
- USS Lawrence County (LST-887)
- USS Lee County (LST-888)
- USS LST-889
- USS LST-890
- USS LST-891
- USS LST-892
- USS LST-893
- USS LST-894
- USS LST-895
- USS LST-896
- USS LST-897
- USS Lincoln County (LST-898)
- USS LST-899

=== USS LST-900 – USS LST-999 ===
- USS Linn County (LST-900)
- USS Litchfield County (LST-901)
- USS Luzerne County (LST-902)
- USS Lyman County (LST-903)
- USS Lyon County (LST-904)
- USS Madera County (LST-905)
- USS LST-906
- USS LST-907
- USS LST-908
- USS LST-909
- USS LST-910
- USS LST-911
- USS Mahnomen County (LST-912)
- USS LST-913
- USS Mahoning County (LST-914)
- USS LST-915
- USS LST-916
- USS LST-917
- USS LST-918
- USS LST-919
- USS LST-920
- USS LST-921
- USS LST-922
- USS LST-923
- USS LST-924
- USS LST-925
- USS LST-926
- USS LST-927
- USS LST-928
- USS LST-929
- USS LST-930
- USS LST-931
- USS LST-932
- USS LST-933
- USS LST-934
- USS LST-935
- USS LST-936
- USS LST-937
- USS Maricopa County (LST-938)
- USS LST-939
- USS LST-940
- USS LST-941
- USS LST-942
- USS LST-943
- USS LST-944
- USS LST-945
- USS LST-946
- USS LST-947
- USS LST-948 — converted to USS Myrmidon (ARL-16)
- USS LST-949
- USS LST-950
- USS LST-951
- USS LST-952
- USS Marinette County (LST-953)
- USS LST-954 — converted to USS Numitor (ARL-17)
- USS LST-955 — converted to USS Patroclus (ARL-19)
- USS LST-956 — converted to USS Sarpedon (ARB-7)
- USS LST-958
- USS LST-958
- USS LST-959
- USS LST-960
- USS LST-961
- USS LST-962 — converted to USS Romulus (ARL-22)
- USS LST-963 — converted to USS Sphinx (ARL-24)
- USS LST-964
- USS LST-965
- USS LST-966 — converted to USS Callisto (AGP-15)
- USS LST-967 — converted to USS Ulysses (ARB-9)
- USS LST-968
- USS LST-969
- USS LST-970
- USS LST-971 — converted to USS Menelaus (ARL-13)
- USS LST-972
- USS LST-973
- USS LST-974
- USS Marion County (LST-975)
- USS LST-976 — converted to USS Telamon (ARB-8)
- USS LST-977 — converted to USS Alecto (AGP-14)
- USS LST-978
- USS LST-979
- USS Meeker County (LST-980)
- USS LST-981
- USS LST-982
- USS Middlesex County (LST-983)
- USS LST-984
- USS LST-985
- USS LST-986
- USS Millard County (LST-987)
- USS Mineral County (LST-988)
- USS LST-989
- USS LST-990
- USS LST-991
- USS LST-992
- USS LST-993
- USS LST-994
- USS LST-995
- USS LST-996
- USS LST-997
- USS LST-998
- USS LST-999

=== USS LST-1000 – USS LST-1099 ===
- USS LST-1000
- USS LST-1001
- USS LST-1002
- USS LST-1003 — converted to USS Coronis (ARL-10)
- USS LST-1004
- USS LST-1005
- USS LST-1006
- USS LST-1007
- USS LST-1008
- USS LST-1009
- USS LST-1010
- USS LST-1011
- USS LST-1012
- USS LST-1013
- USS LST-1014
- USS LST-1015
- USS LST-1016
- USS LST-1017
- USS LST-1018
- USS LST-1019
- USS LST-1020
- USS LST-1021
- USS LST-1022
- USS LST-1023
- USS LST-1024
- USS LST-1025
- USS LST-1026
- USS LST-1027
- USS LST-1028
- USS LST-1029
- USS LST-1030
- USS LST-1031
- USS Monmouth County (LST-1032)
- USS LST-1033
- USS LST-1034
- USS LST-1035
- USS LST-1036 — converted to USS Creon (ARL-11)
- USS LST-1037 — converted to USS Poseidon (ARL-12)
- USS Monroe County (LST-1038)
- USS LST-1039
- USS LST-1040
- USS Montgomery County (LST-1041)
- USS LST-1042
- USS LST-1043
- USS LST-1044
- USS LST-1045
- USS LST-1046
- USS LST-1047
- USS Morgan County (LST-1048)
- USS LST-1049
- USS LST-1050
- USS LST-1051
- USS LST-1052
- USS LST-1053
- USS LST-1054
- USS LST-1055
- USS LST-1056
- USS LST-1057
- USS LST-1058
- USS LST-1059
- USS LST-1060
- USS LST-1061
- USS LST-1062
- USS LST-1063
- USS Nansemond County (LST-1064)
- USS LST-1065
- USS New London County (LST-1066)
- USS Nye County (LST-1067)
- USS Orange County (LST-1068)
- USS Orleans Parish (LST-1069)
- USS LST-1070 — converted to USS Electron (AG-146)
- USS Ouachita County (LST-1071)
- USS LST-1072
- USS Outagamie County (LST-1073)
- USS LST-1074
- USS LST-1075
- USS Page County (LST-1076)
- USS Park County (LST-1077)
- USS LST-1078 — converted to USS Proton (AG-147)
- USS Payette County (LST-1079)
- USS Pender County (LST-1080)
- USS Pima County (LST-1081)
- USS Pitkin County (LST-1082)
- USS Plumas County (LST-1083)
- USS Polk County (LST-1084)
- USS LST-1085 — converted to USS Colington (AG-148)
- USS Potter County (LST-1086)
- USS LST-1087
- USS Pulaski County (LST-1088)
- USS Rice County (LST-1089)
- USS Russell County (LST-1090)
- USS Sagadahoc County (LST-1091)
- USS LST-1092 — converted to USS Aventinus (ARVE-3)
- USS LST-1093 — converted to USS Fabius (ARVA-5)
- USS LST-1094 — converted to USS Chloris (ARVE-4)
- USS LST-1095 — converted to USS Megara (ARVA-6)
- USS St. Clair County (LST-1096)
- USS LST-1097 — converted to USS League Island (AG-149)
- USS LST-1098 — converted to USS Laysan Island (ARST-1)
- USS LST-1099 — converted to USS Okala (ARST-2)

=== USS LST-1100 – USS LST-1198 ===
- USS LST-1100 — converted to USS Palmyra (ARST-3)
- USS Saline County (LST-1101)
- USS LST-1102 — converted to USS Chimon (AG-150/AKS-31)
- USS LST-1103
- USS LST-1104
- USS LST-1105
- USS LST-1106
- USS LST-1107
- USS LST-1108
- USS LST-1109
- USS San Bernardino County (LST-1110)
- USS LST-1111 — converted to USS Blackford (AKS-16/APB-45)
- USS LST-1112 — converted to USS Dorchester (AKS-17/APB-46)
- USS LST-1113 — converted to USS Kingman (AKS-18/APB-47)
- USS LST-1114 — converted to USS Presque Isle (AKS-19), later USS Vanderburgh (APB-48)
- USS LST-1115 — converted to USS Pentheus (ARL-20)
- USS LST-1116 — converted to USS Proserpine (ARL-21)
- USS LST-1117 — converted to USS Tantalus (ARL-27)
- USS LST-1118 — converted to USS Typhon (ARL-28)
- USS LST-1119 — converted to USS Diomedes (ARB-11)
- USS LST-1120
- USS LST-1121 — converted to USS Demeter (ARB-10)
- USS San Joaquin County (LST-1122)
- USS Sedgwick County (LST-1123)
- USS LST-1124 — converted to USS Amphitrite (ARL-29)
- USS LST-1125 — converted to USS Brontes (AGP-17)
- USS Snohomish County (LST-1126)
- USS LST-1127 — converted to USS Helios (ARB-12)
- USS Solano County (LST-1128)
- USS Somervell County (LST-1129)
- USS LST-1130
- USS LST-1131 — converted to USS Askari (ARL-30)
- USS LST-1132 — converted to USS Bellerophon (ARL-31)
- USS LST-1133 — converted to USS Chiron (AGP-18)
- USS Stark County (LST-1134)
- USS LST-1135
- USS LST-1136 — converted to USS Bellona (ARL-32)
- USS LST-1137 — converted to USS Chimaera (ARL-33)
- USS Steuben County (LST-1138)
- USS LST-1139
- USS LST-1140
- USS Stone County (LST-1141)
- USS Strafford County (LST-1142)
- USS LST-1143 — converted to USS Daedalus (ARL-35)
- USS Sublette County (LST-1144)
- USS LST-1145 — converted to USS Gordius (ARL-36)
- USS Summit County (LST-1146)
- USS LST-1147 — converted to USS Indra(ARL-37)
- USS Sumner County (LST-1148)
- USS LST-1149 — converted to USS Krishna (ARL-38)
- USS Sutter County (LST-1150)
- USS LST-1151 — converted to USS Quirinus (ARL-39)
- USS Sweetwater County (LST-1152)
- USS Talbot County (LST-1153)
- USS Tallahatchie County (LST-1154)
- USS LST-1155 — contract cancelled
- USS Terrebonne Parish (LST-1156)
- USS Terrell County (LST-1157)
- USS Tioga County (LST-1158)
- USS Tom Green County (LST-1159)
- USS Traverse County (LST-1160)
- USS Vernon County (LST-1161)
- USS Wahkiakum County (LST-1162)
- USS Waldo County (LST-1163)
- USS Walworth County (LST-1164)
- USS Washoe County (LST-1165)
- USS Washtenaw County (LST-1166)
- USS Westchester County (LST-1167)
- USS Wexford County (LST-1168)
- USS Whitfield County (LST-1169)
- USS Windham County (LST-1170)
- USS De Soto County (LST-1171)
- USS LST-1172 — contract cancelled
- USS Suffolk County (LST-1173)
- USS Grant County (LST-1174)
- USS York County (LST-1175)
- USS Graham County (LST-1176)
- USS Lorain County (LST-1177)
- USS Wood County (LST-1178)
- USS Newport (LST-1179)
- USS Manitowoc (LST-1180)
- USS Sumter (LST-1181)
- USS Fresno (LST-1182)
- USS Peoria (LST-1183)
- USS Frederick (LST-1184)
- USS Schenectady (LST-1185)
- USS Cayuga (LST-1186)
- USS Tuscaloosa (LST-1187)
- USS Saginaw (LST-1188)
- USS San Bernardino (LST-1189)
- USS Boulder (LST-1190)
- USS Racine (LST-1191)
- USS Spartanburg County (LST-1192)
- USS Fairfax County (LST-1193)
- USS La Moure County (LST-1194)
- USS Barbour County (LST-1195)
- USS Harlan County (LST-1196)
- USS Barnstable County (LST-1197)
- USS Bristol County (LST-1198)

== By class ==
=== LST-1 class ===
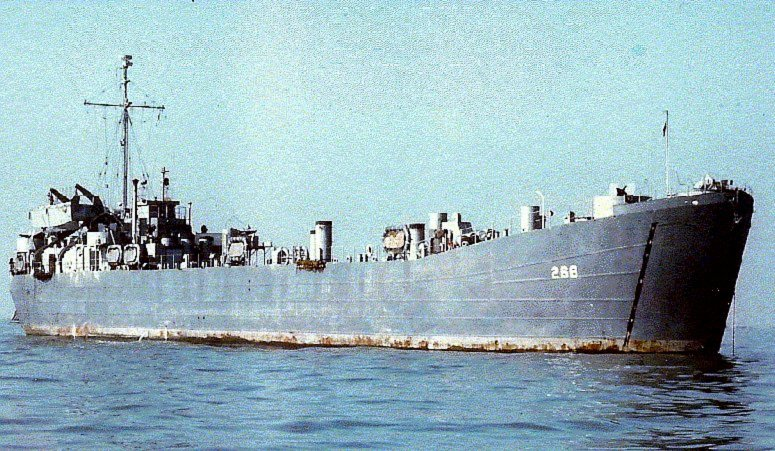
USS Benzie County (LST-266)

- USS LST-1
- USS LST-2
- USS LST-3
- USS LST-4
- USS LST-5
- USS LST-6
- USS LST-7
- USS LST-8
- USS LST-9
- USS LST-10, later USS Achelous (ARL-1)
- USS LST-11
- USS LST-12
- USS LST-13
- USS LST-14, later USS Varuna (AGP-5)
- USS LST-15, later USS Phaon (ARB-3)
- USS LST-16
- USS LST-17
- USS LST-18
- USS LST-19, later USS LST(H)-19
- USS LST-20
- USS LST-21
- USS LST-22
- USS LST-23, later USS LST(H)-23
- USS LST-24
- USS LST-25
- USS LST-26
- USS LST-27
- USS LST-28
- USS LST-29
- USS LST-30
- USS Addison County (LST-31)
- USS Alameda County (LST-32)
- USS LST-33
- USS LST-34
- USS LST-35
- USS LST-36
- USS LST-37
- USS LST-38, later USS LST(H)-38
- USS LST-39, sunk in the West Loch disaster 21 May 1944, later YF-1079
- USS LST-40
- USS LST-41, later USS LST(H)-41
- USS LST-42, later USS LST(H)-42
- USS LST-43, sunk in the West Loch disaster 21 May 1944
- USS LST-44
- USS LST-45
- USS LST-46
- USS LST-47
- USS LST-48
- USS LST-49
- USS LST-50, later USS ARB-13
- USS LST-51
- USS LST-52, Operation Crossroads nuclear test target
- USS LST-53, later USS APL-59
- USS LST-54
- USS LST-55
- USS LST-56
- USS Armstrong County (LST-57)
- USS LST-58
- USS LST-59
- USS Atchison County (LST-60)
- USS LST-61
- USS LST-62
- USS LST-63
- USS LST-64
- USS LST-65
- USS LST-66
- USS LST-67
- USS LST-68
- USS LST-69, sunk in the West Loch disaster 21 May 1944, no fatalities
- USS LST-70
- USS LST-71
- USS LST-72
- USS LST-73
- USS LST-74
- USS LST-75
- USS LST-76
- USS LST-77
- USS LST-78
- USS LST-79
- USS LST-80
- USS LST-81, later USS ARL-5
- USS LST-82, later USS ARL-6
- USS LST-83, later USS Adonis (ARL-4)
- USS LST-84, later USS LST(H)-84
- LST-85 – LST-116, cancelled
- USS LST-117, later USS LST(H)-117
- USS LST-118, later USS LST(H)-118
- USS LST-119
- USS LST-120
- USS LST-121, later USS LST(H)-121
- USS LST-122
- USS LST-123, later USS LST(H)-123
- USS LST-124
- USS LST-125, Operation Crossroads target
- USS LST-126
- USS LST-127
- USS LST-128
- USS LST-129, later USS Cohasset (IX-198)
- USS LST-130
- USS LST-131
- USS LST-132, later USS Zeus (ARB-4)
- USS LST-133, Operation Crossroads target
- USS LST-134
- USS LST-135, later USS Orestes (AGP-10)
- USS LST-136, later USS Egeria (ARL-8)
- USS LST-137
- USS LST-138, later Altalena
- USS LST-139
- USS LST-140
- USS LST-141
- LST-142 – LST-156, cancelled
- USS LST-157
- USS LST-158
- USS LST-159
- USS LST-160
- USS LST-161
- USS LST-162
- USS LST-163
- USS LST-164
- USS LST-165
- USS LST-166
- USS LST-167
- USS LST-168
- USS LST-169
- USS LST-170
- USS LST-171
- USS LST-172
- USS LST-173
- USS LST-174
- USS LST-175
- USS LST-176
- USS LST-177
- USS LST-178
- USS LST-179, sunk in the West Loch disaster 21 May 1944, no fatalities
- USS LST-180
- USS LST-181
- LST-182 – LST-196, cancelled
- USS LST-197
- USS LST-198
- USS LST-199
- USS LST-200
- USS LST-201, later USS Pontus (AGP-20)
- USS LST-202
- USS LST-203
- USS LST-204
- USS LST-205, damaged in the West Loch disaster 21 May 1944, no fatalities, later LST(H)-205
- USS LST-206
- USS LST-207
- USS LST-208
- USS Bamberg County (LST-209)
- USS LST-210
- USS LST-211
- USS LST-212
- USS LST-213, later USS LST(H)-213
- USS LST-214
- USS LST-215
- USS LST-216
- USS LST-217
- USS LST-218
- USS LST-219
- USS LST-220, Operation Crossroads target
- USS LST-221
- USS LST-222, later USS LST(H)-222
- USS LST-223
- USS LST-224
- USS LST-225, damaged in the West Loch disaster 21 May 1944, no fatalities
- USS LST-226
- USS LST-227
- USS LST-228
- USS LST-229
- USS LST-230
- USS LST-231, later USS Atlas (ARL-7)
- LST-232 – LST-236, cancelled
- USS LST-237
- USS LST-238
- USS LST-239
- USS LST-240
- USS LST-241
- USS LST-242, later USS LST(H)-242
- USS LST-243, later USS LST(H)-243
- USS LST-244
- USS LST-245
- USS LST-246
- USS LST-247, later USS LST(H)-247
- LST-248 – LST-260, cancelled
- USS LST-261
- USS LST-262
- USS Benton County (LST-263)
- USS LST-264
- USS LST-265
- USS Benzie County (LST-266)
- USS LST-267
- USS LST-268, later USS LST(H)-268
- USS LST-269
- USS LST-270
- USS LST-271
- USS LST-272
- USS LST-273, repatriated Japanese prisoners from Featherston prisoner of war camp
- USS LST-274, damaged in the West Loch disaster 21 May 1944, no fatalities
- USS LST-275, repatriated Japanese prisoners from Featherston prisoner of war camp
- USS LST-276, later USS LST(H)-276
- USS LST-277
- USS LST-278, later USS Seaward (IX-209)
- USS Berkeley County (LST-279)
- USS LST-280
- USS LST-281
- USS LST-282
- USS LST-283
- USS LST-284
- USS LST-285
- USS LST-286
- USS LST-287
- USS Berkshire County (LST-288)
- USS LST-289, damaged in Exercise Tiger, 28 April 1944, 13 fatalities
- USS LST-290
- USS LST-291
- USS LST-292
- USS LST-293
- USS LST-294
- USS LST-295
- LST-296 – LST-300, cancelled
- USS LST-297
- USS LST-298
- USS LST-299
- USS LST-300, cancelled
- USS LST-301
- USS LST-302
- USS LST-303
- USS LST-304
- USS LST-305
- USS Bernalillo County (LST-306)
- USS LST-307
- USS LST-308
- USS LST-309
- USS LST-310, conversion to USS Aeolus (ARL-42) cancelled
- USS LST-311
- USS LST-312
- USS LST-313
- USS LST-314
- USS LST-315
- USS LST-316, conversion to USS Cerberus (ARL-43) cancelled
- USS LST-317, conversion to USS Conus (ARL-44) cancelled
- USS LST-318
- USS LST-319
- USS LST-320
- USS LST-321
- USS LST-322
- USS LST-323
- USS LST-324
- USS LST-325, Brodie landing system installed, museum ship in Evansville, Indiana.
- USS LST-326
- USS LST-327
- USS LST-328, later USS Oceanus (ARB-2)
- USS LST-329, later USS Aristaeus (ARB-1)
- USS LST-330, later USS Portunus (AGP-4)
- USS LST-331
- USS LST-332, conversion to USS Feronia (ARL-45) cancelled
- USS LST-333
- USS LST-334
- USS LST-335
- USS LST-336
- USS LST-337
- USS LST-338
- USS LST-339
- USS LST-340, beached, later USS Spark (IX-196)
- USS LST-341
- USS LST-342
- USS LST-343
- USS Blanco County (LST-344)
- USS LST-345
- USS LST-346
- USS LST-347
- USS LST-348
- USS LST-349
- USS LST-350, conversion to USS Chandra (ARL-46) cancelled
- USS LST-351
- USS LST-352
- USS LST-353, sunk in the West Loch disaster 21 May 1944
- USS LST-354
- USS LST-355
- USS Bledsoe County (LST-356)
- USS LST-357
- USS LST-358
- USS LST-359
- USS LST-360
- USS LST-361
- USS LST-362
- USS LST-363
- USS LST-364
- USS LST-365
- USS LST-366
- USS LST-367
- USS LST-368
- USS LST-369
- USS LST-370
- USS LST-371
- USS LST-372
- USS LST-373
- USS LST-374, conversion to USS Minerva (ARL-47) cancelled
- USS LST-375
- USS LST-376
- USS LST-377
- USS LST-378
- USS LST-379
- USS LST-380
- USS LST-381
- USS LST-382
- USS LST-383
- USS LST-384
- USS LST-385
- USS LST-386
- USS LST-387
- USS LST-388, Operation Crossroads target
- USS Boone County (LST-389)
- USS LST-390
- USS Bowman County (LST-391)
- USS LST-392
- USS LST-393, Brodie landing system installed
- USS LST-394
- USS LST-395
- USS LST-396
- USS LST-397
- USS LST-398
- USS LST-399, later IX-511
- USS Bradley County (LST-400)
- USS LST-401
- USS LST-402
- USS LST-403
- USS LST-404
- USS LST-405
- USS LST-406
- USS LST-407
- USS LST-408
- USS LST-409
- USS LST-410
- USS LST-411
- USS LST-412
- USS LST-413
- USS LST-414
- USS LST-415
- USS LST-416
- USS LST-417
- USS LST-418
- USS LST-419
- USS LST-420
- USS LST-421
- USS LST-422
- USS LST-423
- USS LST-424
- USS LST-425
- USS LST-426
- USS LST-427
- USS LST-428
- USS LST-429
- USS LST-430
- LST-431, cancelled
- USS LST-446
- USS LST-447, sunk by kamikaze Okinawa 7 April 1945
- USS LST-448
- USS LST-449
- USS LST-450, later USS LST(H)-450
- USS LST-451
- USS LST-452
- USS LST-453, later USS Remus (ARL-40)
- USS LST-454
- USS LST-455, later USS Achilles (ARL-41)
- USS LST-456
- USS LST-457
- USS LST-458
- USS LST-459
- USS LST-460
- USS LST-461
- USS LST-462
- USS LST-463
- USS LST-464, later USS LST(H)-464
- USS LST-465
- USS LST-466
- USS LST-467
- USS LST-468
- USS LST-469
- USS LST-470
- USS LST-471
- USS LST-472
- USS LST-473
- USS LST-474
- USS LST-475
- USS LST-476
- USS LST-477, later USS LST(H)-477
- USS LST-478
- USS LST-479
- USS LST-480, sunk in the West Loch disaster 21 May 1944
- USS LST-481
- USS Branch County (LST-482), later USS LST(H)-482
- USS Brewster County (LST-483)
- USS LST-484
- USS LST-485
- USS LST-486, later USS LST(H)-486
- USS LST-487
- USS LST-488, later USS LST(H)-488
- USS LST-489, later USS Amycus (ARL-2)
- USS LST-490, later USS Agenor (ARL-3)

=== LST-491 class ===
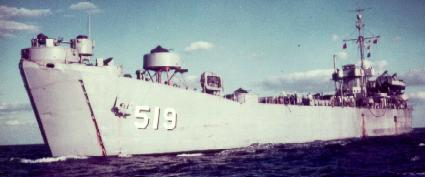
USS Calhoun County (LST-519)

- USS LST-491
- USS LST-492
- USS LST-493
- USS LST-494
- USS LST-495
- USS LST-496
- USS LST-497
- USS LST-498
- USS LST-499
- USS LST-500
- USS LST-501
- USS LST-502
- USS LST-503
- USS Buchanan County (LST-504)
- USS LST-505
- USS LST-506
- USS LST-507, sunk in Exercise Tiger, 28 April 1944, 202 fatalities
- USS LST-508
- USS Bulloch County (LST-509)
- USS Buncombe County (LST-510), converted to ferry MV Virginia Beach ca 1960, renamed MV Cape Henlopen, in service as of 2025
- USS LST-511, damaged in Exercise Tiger, 28 April 1944, no fatalities
- USS Burnett County (LST-512)
- USS LST-513, later USS Endymion (ARL-9)
- USS LST-514, later USS Midas (ARB-5)
- USS Caddo Parish (LST-515)
- USS Calaveras County (LST-516)
- USS LST-517
- USS LST-518, later USS Nestor (ARB-6)
- USS Calhoun County (LST-519)
- USS LST-520
- USS Cape May County (LST-521)
- USS LST-522
- USS LST-523
- USS LST-524
- USS Caroline County (LST-525)
- USS LST-526
- USS Cassia County (LST-527)
- USS Catahoula Parish (LST-528)
- USS Cayuga County (LST-529)
- USS LST-530
- USS LST-531, sunk in Exercise Tiger, 28 April 1944, 424 fatalities
- USS Chase County (LST-532)
- USS Cheboygan County (LST-533)
- USS LST-534, damaged by kamikaze Okinawa 22 June 1945
- USS LST-535
- USS LST-536
- USS LST-537
- USS LST-538
- USS LST-539
- USS LST-540
- USS LST-541

=== LST-542 class ===
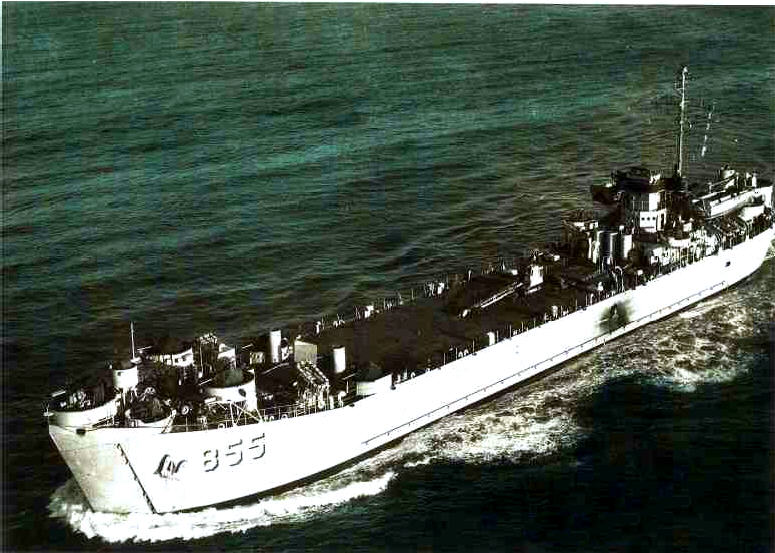
USS Kent County (LST-855)

- USS Chelan County (LST-542)
- USS LST-543
- USS LST-544
- USS LST-545, Operation Crossroads target
- USS LST-546
- USS LST-547
- USS LST-548
- USS LST-549
- USS LST-550
- USS Chesterfield County (LST-551), Operation Castle nuclear test participant
- USS LST-552
- USS LST-553
- USS LST-554
- USS LST-555
- USS LST-556
- USS LST-557
- USS LST-558
- USS LST-559
- USS LST-560
- USS Chittenden County (LST-561)
- USS LST-562
- USS LST-563
- USS LST-564
- USS LST-565
- USS LST-566
- USS LST-567
- USS LST-568, wrecked by Typhoon Louise Okinawa October 1945
- USS LST-569
- USS LST-570
- USS LST-571
- USS LST-572
- USS LST-573
- USS LST-574
- USS LST-575
- USS LST-576
- USS LST-577
- USS LST-578
- USS LST-579
- USS LST-580
- USS LST-581
- USS LST-582
- USS Churchill County (LST-583)
- USS LST-584
- USS LST-585
- USS LST-586
- USS LST-587
- USS LST-588
- USS LST-589
- USS LST-590
- USS LST-591
- USS LST-592
- USS LST-593
- USS LST-594
- USS LST-595
- USS LST-596
- USS LST-597
- USS LST-598
- USS LST-599, damaged by kamikaze Okinawa 2 April 1945
- USS LST-600
- USS Clarke County (LST-601)
- USS Clearwater County (LST-602)
- USS Coconino County (LST-603)
- USS LST-604, later USS Silenus (AGP-11)
- USS LST-605
- USS LST-606
- USS LST-607
- USS LST-608
- USS LST-609
- USS LST-610
- USS Crook County (LST-611)
- USS LST-612
- USS LST-613
- USS LST-614
- USS LST-615
- USS LST-616
- USS LST-617
- USS LST-618
- USS LST-619
- USS LST-620
- USS LST-621
- USS LST-622
- USS LST-623
- USS LST-624
- USS LST-625
- USS LST-626
- USS LST-627
- USS LST-628
- USS LST-629
- USS LST-630
- USS LST-631
- USS LST-632
- USS LST-633
- USS LST-634
- USS LST-635
- USS LST-636
- USS LST-637
- USS LST-638
- USS LST-639
- USS LST-640
- USS LST-641
- USS LST-642
- USS LST-643
- USS LST-644, later USS Minos (ARL-14)
- USS LST-645, later USS Minotaur (ARL-15)
- USS LST-646
- USS LST-647
- USS LST-648
- USS LST-649
- USS LST-650, later USS Pandemus (ARL-18)
- USS LST-651
- USS LST-652, later USS LST(H)-652
- USS LST-653
- USS LST-654
- USS LST-655
- USS LST-656
- USS LST-657
- USS LST-658
- USS LST-659
- USS LST-660
- USS LST-661, Operation Crossroads target
- USS LST-662
- USS LST-663
- USS LST-664
- USS LST-665
- USS LST-666
- USS LST-667
- USS LST-668
- USS LST-669
- USS LST-670
- USS LST-671
- USS LST-672
- USS LST-673
- USS LST-674
- USS LST-675
- USS LST-676
- USS LST-677, later USS Yolo (APB-43)
- USS LST-678, later USS Presque Isle (APB-44)
- USS LST-679
- USS LST-680
- USS LST-681
- USS LST-682
- USS LST-683
- USS LST-684
- USS Curry County (LST-685)
- USS LST-686
- USS LST-687
- USS LST-688
- USS Daggett County (LST-689)
- USS LST-690
- USS LST-691
- USS Daviess County (LST-692)
- USS LST-693
- USS LST-694
- USS LST-695
- USS LST-696
- USS LST-697
- USS LST-698
- USS LST-699
- USS LST-700, damaged by kamikaze Lingayen Gulf 17 & 18 January 1945
- USS LST-701
- USS LST-702
- USS LST-703
- USS LST-704
- USS LST-705
- USS LST-706
- USS LST-707
- USS LST-708
- USS LST-709
- USS LST-710, later USS Accomac (APB-49)
- USS LST-711
- USS LST-712
- USS LST-713
- USS LST-714
- USS DeKalb County (LST-715)
- USS LST-716
- USS LST-717
- USS LST-718
- USS LST-719
- USS LST-720
- USS LST-721
- USS Dodge County (LST-722)
- USS LST-723
- USS LST-724
- USS LST-725
- USS LST-726
- USS LST-727
- USS LST-728
- USS LST-729
- USS LST-730
- USS Douglas County (LST-731), later USS LST(H)-731
- USS LST-732
- USS LST-733
- USS LST-734
- USS Dukes County (LST-735)
- USS LST-736
- USS LST-737
- USS LST-738
- USS LST-739
- USS LST-740
- USS LST-741
- USS Dunn County (LST-742)
- USS LST-743
- USS LST-744
- USS LST-745
- USS LST-746
- USS LST-747
- USS LST-748
- USS LST-749
- USS LST-750
- USS LST-751
- USS LST-752
- USS LST-753
- USS LST-754
- USS LST-755
- USS LST-756
- USS LST-757
- USS Duval County (LST-758)
- USS Eddy County (LST-759)
- USS LST-760
- USS Esmeraldo County (LST-761)
- USS Floyd County (LST-762), Operation Castle participant
- USS LST-763
- USS LST-764
- USS LST-765
- USS LST-766
- USS LST-767
- USS LST-768
- USS LST-769
- USS LST-770
- USS LST-771
- USS Ford County (LST-772)
- USS LST-773, later USS Antigone (AGP-16)
- USS LST-774
- USS LST-775
- USS LST-776, Brodie landing system installed
- USS LST-777
- USS LST-778
- USS LST-779
- USS LST-780
- USS LST-781
- USS LST-782
- USS LST-783
- USS Garfield County (LST-784)
- USS LST-785
- USS Garrett County (LST-786)
- USS LST-787
- USS LST-788
- USS LST-789
- USS LST-790, later USS LST(H)-790
- USS LST-791
- USS LST-792
- USS LST-793
- USS Gibson County (LST-794)
- USS LST-795
- USS LST-796
- USS LST-797
- USS LST-798
- USS Greer County (LST-799)
- USS LST-800
- USS LST-801
- USS Hamilton County (LST-802)
- USS Hampden County (LST-803)
- USS LST-804
- USS LST-805
- USS LST-806
- USS LST-807
- USS LST-808, sunk by air attack Okinawa 18 May 1945
- USS LST-809
- USS LST-810
- USS LST-811
- USS LST-812
- USS LST-813
- USS LST-814
- USS LST-815
- USS LST-816
- USS LST-817, Operation Crossroads target
- USS LST-818
- USS Hampshire County (LST-819)
- USS LST-820
- USS Harnett County (LST-821), later AGP-821
- USNS Harris County (T-LST-822), Operation Dominic nuclear test participant
- USS LST-823
- USS Henry County (LST-824), Operation Dominic participant
- USS Hickman County (LST-825), Operation Castle participant
- USS LST-826, wrecked by Typhoon Louise Okinawa October 1945
- USS Hillsborough County (LST-827)
- USS LST-828
- USS LST-829
- USS LST-830
- USS LST-831
- USS LST-832
- USS LST-833
- USS LST-834
- USS Hillsdale County (LST-835)
- USS Holmes County (LST-836)
- USS LST-837
- USS Hunterdon County (LST-838), later AGP-838
- USS Iredell County (LST-839)
- USS Iron County (LST-840)
- USS LST-841
- USS LST-842
- USS LST-843
- USS LST-844
- USS Jefferson County (LST-845)
- USS Jennings County (LST-846)
- USS LST-847
- USS Jerome County (LST-848)
- USS Johnson County (LST-849)
- USS Juniata County (LST-850)
- USS LST-851
- USS LST-852, later USS Satyr (ARL-23)
- USS Kane County (LST-853)
- USS Kemper County (LST-854)
- USS Kent County (LST-855)
- USS LST-856
- USS King County (LST-857), later AG-157 Regulus II test launcher
- USS LST-858, later USS Stentor (ARL-26)
- USS Lafayette County (LST-859)
- USS LST-860
- USS LST-861, Operation Crossroads participant
- USS LST-862
- USS LST-863
- USS LST-864
- USS LST-865
- USS LST-866
- USS LST-867
- USS LST-868
- USS LST-869
- USS LST-870
- USS LST-871, later USS LST(H)-871, Operation Crossroads participant
- USS LST-872
- USS LST-873
- USS LST-874
- USS LST-875
- USS LST-876
- USS LST-877
- USS LST-878
- USS LST-879
- USS Lake County (LST-880)
- USS LST-881, Operation Crossroads participant
- USS LST-882
- USS La Moure County (LST-883)
- USS LST-884, scuttled after 1 April 1945 kamikaze attack, 6 May
- USS LST-885
- USS LST-886
- USS Lawrence County (LST-887)
- USS Lee County (LST-888)
- USS LST-889
- USS LST-890
- USS LST-891
- USS LST-892
- USS LST-893
- USS LST-894
- USS LST-895
- USS LST-896
- USS LST-897
- USS Lincoln County (LST-898)
- USS LST-899
- USS Linn County (LST-900)
- USS Litchfield County (LST-901)
- USS Luzerne County (LST-902)
- USS Lyman County (LST-903)
- USS Lyon County (LST-904)
- USS Madera County (LST-905)
- USS LST-906
- USS LST-907
- USS LST-908
- USS LST-909
- USS LST-910
- USS LST-911
- USS Mahnomen County (LST-912), damaged by kamikaze Lingayen Gulf 8 January 1945
- USS LST-913
- USS Mahoning County (LST-914)
- USS LST-915
- USS LST-916
- USS LST-917
- USS LST-918
- USS LST-919
- USS LST-920
- USS LST-921
- USS LST-922
- USS LST-923
- USS LST-924
- USS LST-925
- USS LST-926
- USS LST-927
- USS LST-928
- USS LST-929, later USS LST(H)-929
- USS LST-930, later USS LST(H)-930
- USS LST-931, later USS LST(H)-931
- USS LST-932
- USS LST-933
- USS LST-934
- USS LST-935
- USS LST-936
- USS LST-937
- USS Maricopa County (LST-938)
- USS LST-939
- USS LST-940
- USS LST-941
- USS LST-942
- USS LST-943
- USS LST-944
- USS LST-945
- USS LST-946
- USS LST-947
- USS LST-948, later USS Myrmidon (ARL-16)
- USS LST-949, later USS LST(H)-949
- USS LST-950, later USS LST(H)-950
- USS LST-951, later USS LST(H)-951
- USS LST-952, later USS LST(H)-952
- USS Marinette County (LST-953)
- USS LST-954, later USS Numitor (ARL-17)
- USS LST-955, later USS Patroclus (ARL-19)
- USS LST-956, later USS Sarpedon (ARB-7)
- USS LST-958
- USS LST-958
- USS LST-959
- USS LST-960
- USS LST-961
- USS LST-961, later USS Romulus (ARL-22)
- USS LST-962, later USS Sphinx (ARL-24)
- USS LST-964
- USS LST-965
- USS LST-966, later USS Callisto (AGP-15)
- USS LST-967, later USS Ulysses (ARB-9)
- USS LST-968
- USS LST-969
- USS LST-970
- USS LST-971, later USS Menelaus (ARL-13)
- USS LST-972
- USS LST-973
- USS LST-974
- USS Marion County (LST-975), Operation Wigwam nuclear test participant
- USS LST-976, later USS Telamon (ARB-9)
- USS LST-977, later USS Alecto (AGP-14)
- USS LST-978
- USS LST-979
- USS Meeker County (LST-980)
- USS LST-981
- USS LST-982
- USS Middlesex County (LST-983)
- USS LST-984
- USS LST-985
- USS LST-986
- USS Millard County (LST-987)
- USS Mineral County (LST-988)
- USS LST-989, Operation Crossroads participant
- USS LST-990
- USS LST-991
- USS LST-992
- USS LST-993
- USS LST-994
- USS LST-995
- USS LST-996
- USS LST-997
- USS LST-998
- USS LST-999
- USS LST-1000
- USS LST-1001
- USS LST-1002
- USS LST-1003, later USS Coronis (ARL-10)
- USS LST-1004
- USS LST-1005
- USS LST-1006
- USS LST-1007
- USS LST-1008
- USS LST-1009
- USS LST-1010
- USS LST-1011
- USS LST-1012
- USS LST-1013
- USS LST-1014
- USS LST-1015
- USS LST-1016
- USS LST-1017
- USS LST-1018
- USS LST-1019
- USS LST-1020
- USS LST-1021
- USS LST-1022
- USS LST-1023
- USS LST-1024
- USS LST-1025
- USS LST-1026
- USS LST-1027
- USS LST-1028
- USS LST-1029
- USS LST-1030
- USS LST-1031
- USS Monmouth County (LST-1032)
- USS LST-1033, later USS LST(H)-1033
- USS LST-1034
- USS LST-1035
- USS LST-1036, later USS Creon (ARL-11)
- USS LST-1037, later USS Poseidon (ARL-12)
- USS Monroe County (LST-1038)
- USS LST-1039
- USS LST-1040
- USS Montgomery County (LST-1041)
- USS LST-1042
- USS LST-1043
- USS LST-1044
- USS LST-1045
- USS LST-1046
- USS LST-1047
- USS Morgan County (LST-1048), Operation Wigwam participant
- USS LST-1049
- USS LST-1050
- USS LST-1051
- USS LST-1052
- USS LST-1053
- USS LST-1054
- USS LST-1055
- USS LST-1056
- USS LST-1057
- USS LST-1058
- USS LST-1059
- USS LST-1060
- USS LST-1061
- USS LST-1062
- USS LST-1063
- USS Nansemond County (LST-1064)
- USS LST-1065
- USS New London County (LST-1066)
- USS Nye County (LST-1067)
- USS Orange County (LST-1068)
- USS Orleans Parish (LST-1069), later MCS-6
- USS LST-1070, later USS Electron (AG-146/AKS-27)
- USS Ouachita County (LST-1071)
- USS LST-1072
- USS Outagamie County (LST-1073)
- USS LST-1074
- USS LST-1075
- USS Page County (LST-1076), Operation Dominic participant
- USS Park County (LST-1077)
- USS LST-1078, later USS Proton (AG-147/AKS-28)
- USS Payette County (LST-1079)
- USS Pender County (LST-1080)
- USS Pima County (LST-1081)
- USS Pitkin County (LST-1082)
- USS Plumas County (LST-1083)
- USS Polk County (LST-1084), Operation Dominic participant
- USS LST-1085, later USS Colington (AG-148/AKS-29)
- USS Potter County (LST-1086)
- USS LST-1087
- USS Pulaski County (LST-1088)
- USS Rice County (LST-1089)
- USS Russell County (LST-1090)
- USS Sagadahoc County (LST-1091)
- USS LST-1092, later USS Aventinus (ARVE-3)
- USS LST-1093, later USS Fabius (ARVA-5)
- USS LST-1094, later USS Chloris (ARVE-4)
- USS LST-1095. later USS Megara (ARVA-6)
- USS St. Clair County (LST-1096)
- USS LST-1097, later USS League Island (AG-149/AKS-30)
- USS LST-1098, later USS Laysan Island (ARST-1)
- USS LST-1099, later USS Okala (ARST-2)
- USS LST-1100, later USS Palmyra (ARST-3)
- USS Saline County (LST-1101)
- USS LST-1102, later USS Chimon (AG-150/AKS-31)
- USS LST-1103
- USS LST-1104
- USS LST-1105
- USS LST-1106
- USS LST-1107
- USS LST-1108
- USS LST-1109
- USS San Bernardino County (LST-1110)
- USS LST-1111, later USS Blackford (AKS-16/APB-45)
- USS LST-1112, later USS Dorchester (AKS-17/APB-46)
- USS LST-1113, later USS Kingman (AKS-18/APB-47)
- USS LST-1114
- USS LST-1115, later USS Pentheus (ARL-20)
- USS LST-1116, later USS Proserpine (ARL-21)
- USS LST-1117, later USS Tantalus (ARL-27)
- USS LST-1118, later USS Typhon (ARL-28)
- USS LST-1119, later USS Diomedes (ARB-11)
- USS LST-1120
- USS LST-1121, later USS Demeter (ARB-10)
- USS San Joaquin County (LST-1122)
- USS Sedgwick County (LST-1123)
- USS LST-1124, later USS Amphitrite (ARL-29)
- USS LST-1125, later USS Brontes (AGP-17)
- USS Snohomish County (LST-1126), Operation Dominic participant
- USS LST-1127, later USS Helios (ARB-12)
- USS Solano County (LST-1128)
- USS Somervell County (LST-1129)
- USS LST-1130
- USS LST-1131, later USS Askari (ARL-30)
- USS LST-1132, later USS Bellerophon (ARL-31)
- USS LST-1133, later USS Chiron (AGP-18)
- USS Stark County (LST-1134)
- USS LST-1135
- USS LST-1136, later USS Bellona (ARL-32)
- USS LST-1137, later USS Chimaera (ARL-33)
- USS Steuben County (LST-1138)
- USS LST-1139
- USS LST-1140
- USS Stone County (LST-1141)
- USS Strafford County (LST-1142)
- USS LST-1143, later USS Daedalus (ARL-35)
- USS Sublette County (LST-1144)
- USS LST-1145, later USS Gordius (ARL-36)
- USS Summit County (LST-1146), nuclear tests participant (Note: USS Summit County participated in Operation Castle and Operation Dominic)
- USS LST-1147, later USS Indra (ARL-37)
- USS Sumner County (LST-1148)
- USS LST-1149, later USS Krishna (ARL-38)
- USS Sutter County (LST-1150)
- USS LST-1151, later USS Quirinus (ARL-39)
- USS Sweetwater County (LST-1152)

=== Talbot County-class ===
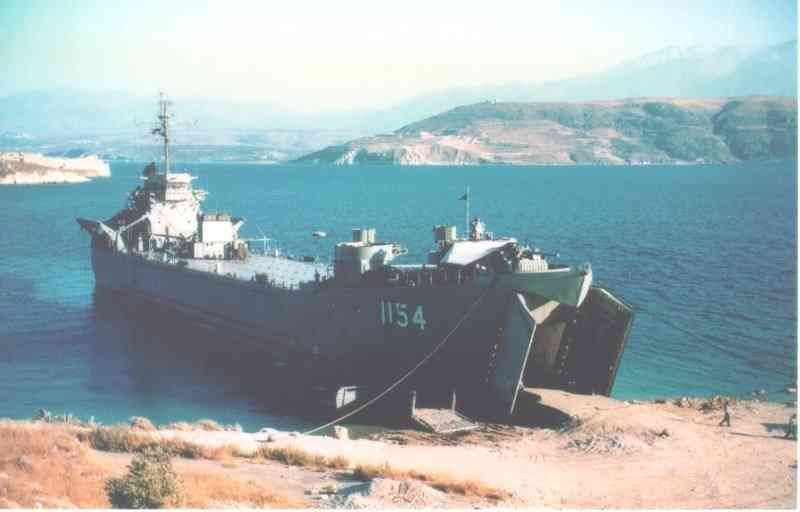
USS Tallahatchie County (LST-1154)

Talbot County-class

Served 1947 - 1970.

- USS Talbot County (LST-1153)
- USS Tallahatchie County (LST-1154), later AVB-2
- USS LST-1155 — contract cancelled

=== Terrebonne Parish-class ===
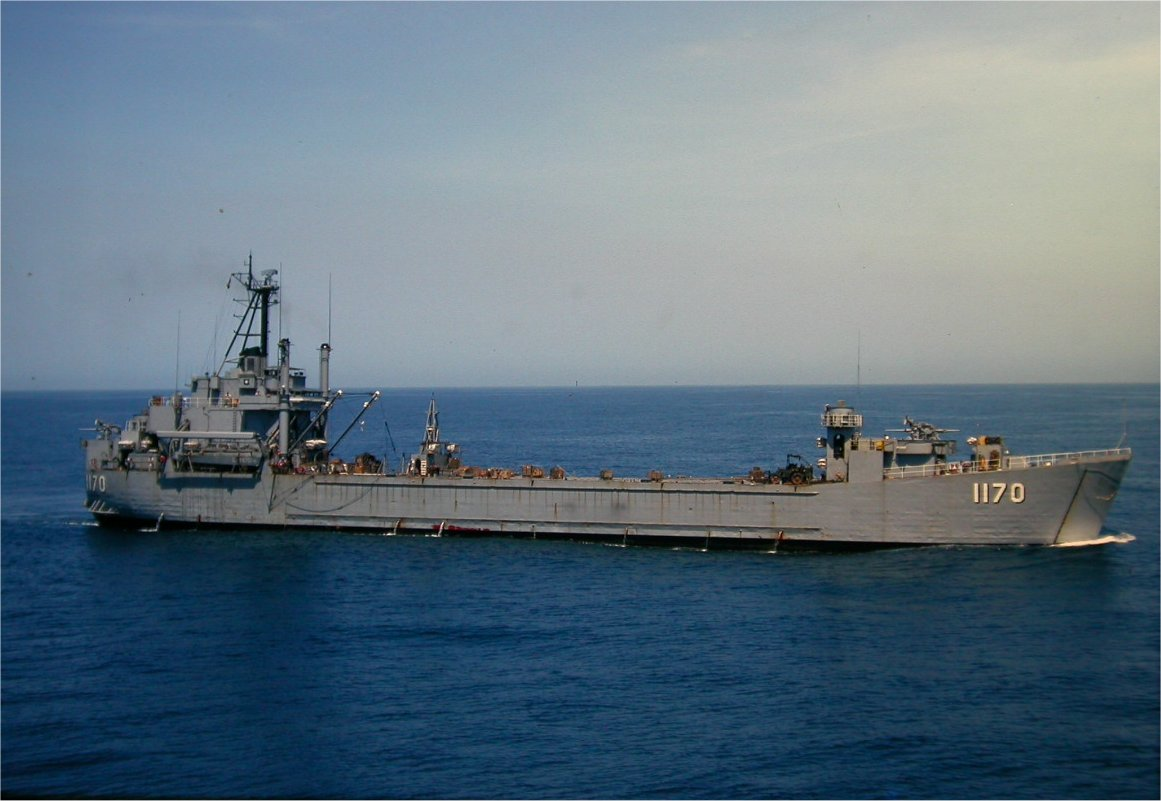
USS Windham County (LST-1170)

Terrebonne Parish-class

Served 1952 - 1973.

- USS Terrebonne Parish (LST-1156)
- USS Terrell County (LST-1157), Operation Castle nuclear test participant
- USS Tioga County (LST-1158), Project SHAD chemical/biological test participant
- USS Tom Green County (LST-1159)
- USS Traverse County (LST-1160)
- USS Vernon County (LST-1161)
- USS Wahkiakum County (LST-1162)
- USS Waldo County (LST-1163)
- USS Walworth County (LST-1164)
- USS Washoe County (LST-1165)
- USS Washtenaw County (LST-1166), later MSS-2
- USS Westchester County (LST-1167)
- USS Wexford County (LST-1168), Project SHAD test participant
- USS Whitfield County (LST-1169)
- USS Windham County (LST-1170)

=== De Soto County-class ===
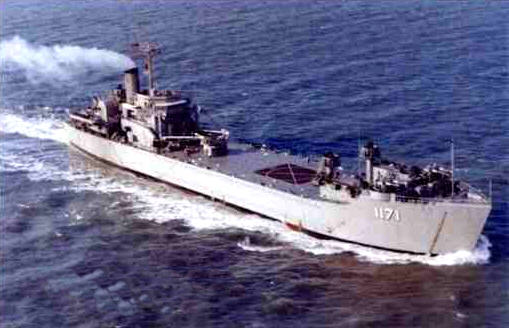
USS De Soto County (LST-1171)

De Soto County-class

Served 1957 - 1973.

- USS De Soto County (LST-1171)
- USS LST-1172 — contract cancelled
- USS Suffolk County (LST-1173)
- USS Grant County (LST-1174)
- USS York County (LST-1175)
- USS Graham County (LST-1176)
- USS Lorain County (LST-1177)
- USS Wood County (LST-1178)

=== Newport-class ===
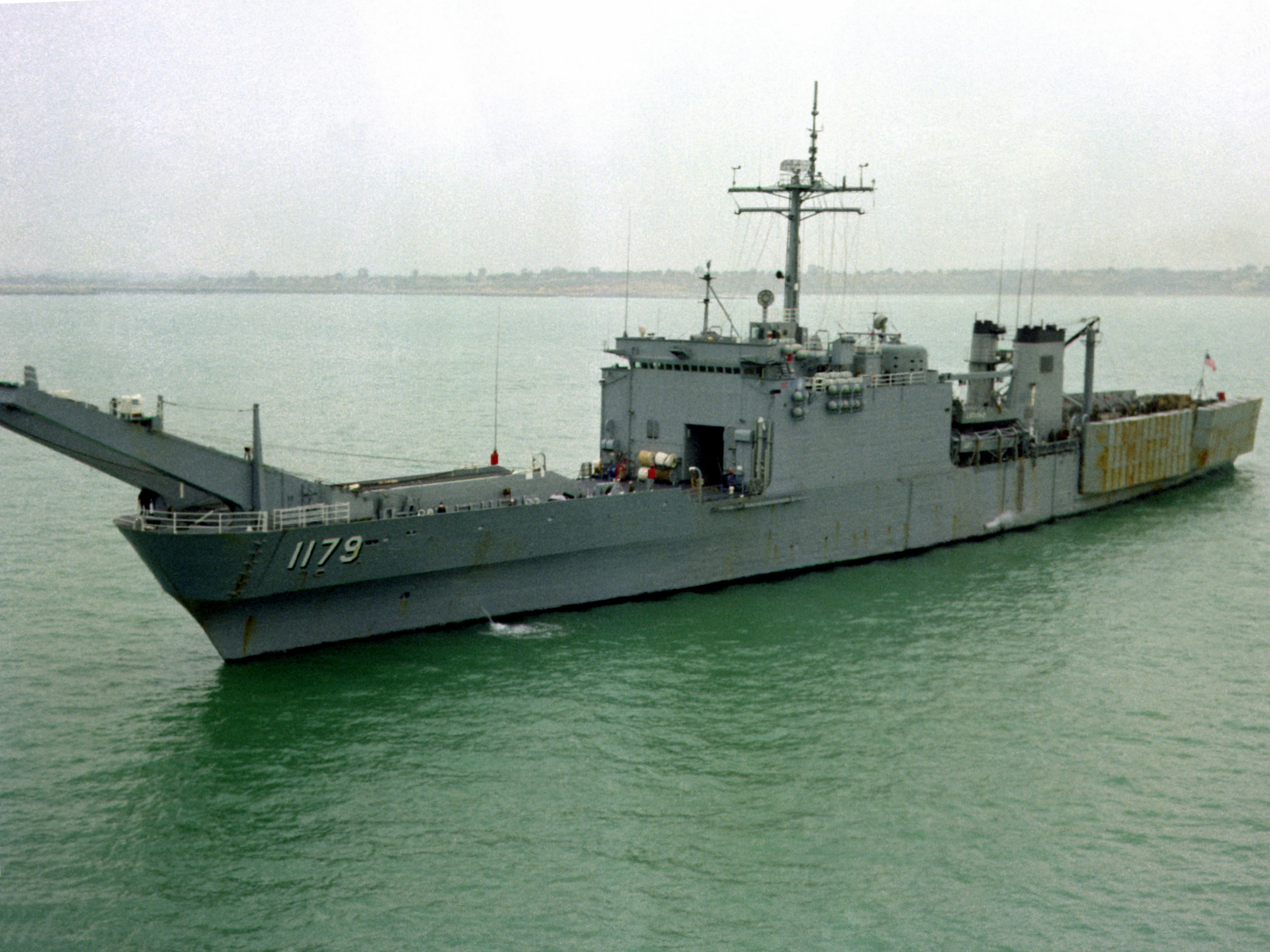
USS Newport (LST-1179)

Newport-class

Served 1969 - 2002.

- USS Newport (LST-1179)
- USS Manitowoc (LST-1180)
- USS Sumter (LST-1181)
- USS Fresno (LST-1182)
- USS Peoria (LST-1183)
- USS Frederick (LST-1184)
- USS Schenectady (LST-1185)
- USS Cayuga (LST-1186)
- USS Tuscaloosa (LST-1187)
- USS Saginaw (LST-1188)
- USS San Bernardino (LST-1189)
- USS Boulder (LST-1190)
- USS Racine (LST-1191)
- USS Spartanburg County (LST-1192)
- USS Fairfax County (LST-1193)
- USS La Moure County (LST-1194), grounded Caleta Cifuncho Bay, Chile, 12 September 2000, CTL
- USS Barbour County (LST-1195)
- USS Harlan County (LST-1196)
- USS Barnstable County (LST-1197)
- USS Bristol County (LST-1198)

== By name ==
=== USS Addison County – USS Curry County ===
- USS Addison County (LST-31)
- USS Alameda County (LST-32)
- USS Armstrong County (LST-57)
- USS Atchison County (LST-60)
- USS Bamberg County (LST-209)
- USS Barbour County (LST-1195)
- USS Barnstable County (LST-1197)
- USS Benton County (LST-263)
- USS Benzie County (LST-266)
- USS Berkeley County (LST-279)
- USS Berkshire County (LST-288)
- USS Bernalillo County (LST-306)
- USS Blanco County (LST-344)
- USS Bledsoe County (LST-356)
- USS Boone County (LST-389)
- USS Boulder (LST-1190)
- USS Bowman County (LST-391)
- USS Bradley County (LST-400)
- USS Branch County (LST-482)
- USS Brewster County (LST-483)
- USS Bristol County (LST-1198)
- USS Buchanan County (LST-504)
- USS Bulloch County (LST-509)
- USS Buncombe County (LST-510)
- USS Burnett County (LST-512)
- USS Caddo Parish (LST-515)
- USS Calaveras County (LST-516)
- USS Calhoun County (LST-519)
- USS Cape May County (LST-521)
- USS Caroline County (LST-525)
- USS Cassia County (LST-527)
- USS Catahoula Parish (LST-528)
- USS Cayuga (LST-1186)
- USS Cayuga County (LST-529)
- USS Chase County (LST-532)
- USS Cheboygan County (LST-533)
- USS Chelan County (LST-542)
- USS Chesterfield County (LST-551)
- USS Chittenden County (LST-561)
- USS Churchill County (LST-583)
- USS Clarke County (LST-601)
- USS Clearwater County (LST-602)
- USS Coconino County (LST-603)
- USS Crook County (LST-611)
- USS Curry County (LST-685)

=== USS Daggett County – USS King County ===
- USS Daggett County (LST-689)
- USS Daviess County (LST-692)
- USS De Soto County (LST-1171)
- USS DeKalb County (LST-715)
- USS Dodge County (LST-722)
- USS Douglas County (LST-731)
- USS Dukes County (LST-735)
- USS Dunn County (LST-742)
- USS Duval County (LST-758)
- USS Eddy County (LST-759)
- USS Esmeraldo County (LST-761)
- USS Fairfax County (LST-1193)
- USS Floyd County (LST-762)
- USS Ford County (LST-772)
- USS Frederick (LST-1184)
- USS Fresno (LST-1182)
- USS Garfield County (LST-784)
- USS Garrett County (LST-786)
- USS Gibson County (LST-794)
- USS Graham County (LST-1176)
- USS Grant County (LST-1174)
- USS Greer County (LST-799)
- USS Hamilton County (LST-802)
- USS Hampden County (LST-803)
- USS Hampshire County (LST-819)
- USS Harlan County (LST-1196)
- USS Harnett County (LST-821), later AGP-821
- USNS Harris County (T-LST-822)
- USS Henry County (LST-824)
- USS Hickman County (LST-825)
- USS Hillsborough County (LST-827)
- USS Hillsdale County (LST-835)
- USS Holmes County (LST-836)
- USS Hunterdon County (LST-838), later AGP-838
- USS Iredell County (LST-839)
- USS Iron County (LST-840)
- USS Jefferson County (LST-845)
- USS Jennings County (LST-846)
- USS Jerome County (LST-848)
- USS Johnson County (LST-849)
- USS Juniata County (LST-850)
- USS Kane County (LST-853)
- USS Kemper County (LST-854)
- USS Kent County (LST-855)
- USS King County (LST-857)

=== USS Lafayette County – USS Pulaski County ===
- USS Lafayette County (LST-859)
- USS Lake County (LST-880)
- USS La Moure County (LST-883)
- USS La Moure County (LST-1194)
- USS Lawrence County (LST-887)
- USS Lee County (LST-888)
- USS Lincoln County (LST-898)
- USS Linn County (LST-900)
- USS Litchfield County (LST-901)
- USS Lorain County (LST-1177)
- USS Luzerne County (LST-902)
- USS Lyman County (LST-903)
- USS Lyon County (LST-904)
- USS Madera County (LST-905)
- USS Mahnomen County (LST-912)
- USS Mahoning County (LST-914)
- USS Manitowoc (LST-1180)
- USS Maricopa County (LST-938)
- USS Marinette County (LST-953)
- USS Marion County (LST-975)
- USS Meeker County (LST-980)
- USS Middlesex County (LST-983)
- USS Millard County (LST-987)
- USS Mineral County (LST-988)
- USS Monmouth County (LST-1032)
- USS Monroe County (LST-1038)
- USS Montgomery County (LST-1041)
- USS Morgan County (LST-1048)
- USS Nansemond County (LST-1064)
- USS New London County (LST-1066)
- USS Newport (LST-1179)
- USS Nye County (LST-1067)
- USS Orange County (LST-1068)
- USS Orleans Parish (LST-1069)
- USS Ouachita County (LST-1071)
- USS Outagamie County (LST-1073)
- USS Overton County (LST-1074)
- USS Page County (LST-1076)
- USS Park County (LST-1077)
- USS Payette County (LST-1079)
- USS Pender County (LST-1080)
- USS Peoria (LST-1183)
- USS Pima County (LST-1081)
- USS Pitkin County (LST-1082)
- USS Plumas County (LST-1083)
- USS Polk County (LST-1084)
- USS Potter County (LST-1086)
- USS Pulaski County (LST-1088)

=== USS Racine County – USS York County ===
- USS Racine (LST-1191)
- USS Rice County (LST-1089)
- USS Russell County (LST-1090)
- USS Sagadahoc County (LST-1091)
- USS Saginaw (LST-1188)
- USS Saline County (LST-1101)
- USS San Bernardino (LST-1189)
- USS San Bernardino County (LST-1110)
- USS San Joaquin County (LST-1122)
- USS Schenectady (LST-1185)
- USS Sedgwick County (LST-1123)
- USS Snohomish County (LST-1126)
- USS Solano County (LST-1128)
- USS Somervell County (LST-1129)
- USS Spartanburg County (LST-1192)
- USS St. Clair County (LST-1096)
- USS Stark County (LST-1134)
- USS Steuben County (LST-1138)
- USS Stone County (LST-1141)
- USS Strafford County (LST-1142)
- USS Sublette County (LST-1144)
- USS Suffolk County (LST-1173)
- USS Summit County (LST-1146)
- USS Sumner County (LST-1148)
- USS Sumter (LST-1181)
- USS Sutter County (LST-1150)
- USS Sweetwater County (LST-1152)
- USS Talbot County (LST-1153)
- USS Tallahatchie County (LST-1154)
- USS Terrebonne Parish (LST-1156)
- USS Terrell County (LST-1157)
- USS Tioga County (LST-1158)
- USS Tom Green County (LST-1159)
- USS Traverse County (LST-1160)
- USS Tuscaloosa (LST-1187)
- USS Vernon County (LST-1161)
- USS Wahkiakum County (LST-1162)
- USS Waldo County (LST-1163)
- USS Walworth County (LST-1164)
- USS Washoe County (LST-1165)
- USS Washtenaw County (LST-1166)
- USS Westchester County (LST-1167)
- USS Wexford County (LST-1168)
- USS Whitfield County (LST-1169)
- USS Windham County (LST-1170)
- USS Wood County (LST-1178)
- USS York County (LST-1175)

== By shipyard ==
Shipyard	City	State	Hull number
American Bridge Co.	Ambridge	PA	137-141, 261-295, 653-681, 754-771, 829-849, 1081-1095
Bethlehem-Fairfield Co.	Baltimore	MD	401-430
Bethlehem-Hingham	Hingham	MA	906-979, 1060-1080
Bethlehem Steel	Quincy	MA	361-382, 1004-1027
Boston Navy Yard	Boston	MA	301-310, 980-1003, 1028-1037
Charleston Navy Yard	Charleston	SC	353-360
Chicago Bridge & Iron	Seneca	IL	132-136, 197-231, 511-522, 600-652, 772-774, 850-860, 1115-1152
Dravo Corp.	Pittsburgh	PA	1-5, 7-15, 17-20, 22-24, 26-60, 730-753, 775-796, 884-905, 1038-1059
Dravo Corp.	Wilmington	DE	6, 16, 21, 25
Jeffersonville Boat	Jeffersonville	IN	61-84, 117-121, 181, 501-510, 523-530, 682-729, 797-805, 861-873, 1096-1100
Kaiser Inc.	Vancouver	WA	446-475
Kaiser Inc.	Richmond	CA	476-490
Missouri Valley Bridge & Iron	Evansville	IN	122-131, 157-180, 237-247, 491-500, 531-599, 806-828, 874-883, 1101-1114
Newport News Shipyard	Newport News	VA	383-400
Norfolk Navy Yard	Norfolk	VA	333-352
Philadelphia Navy Yard	Philadelphia	PA	319-332

- Data is based on p. 4 of Role of the LSTs (Landing Ship Tank) in WW II Amphibious Operations from National Park Service.

== See also ==
- List of LSTs
- List of U.S. Navy ships sunk or damaged in action during World War II § Landing ship, tank (LST)
