= USS LST-1022 =

1944 LST-542-class tank landing ship

History

United States
- Name: USS LST-1022
- Builder: Bethlehem Shipbuilding Corporation's Fore River Shipyard, Quincy, Massachusetts
- Laid down: 18 April 1944
- Launched: 16 May 1944
- Commissioned: 24 May 1944
- Decommissioned: 31 December 1947
- Stricken: 22 January 1948
- Honors and awards: 1 battle star (World War II)
- Fate: Sold for scrapping, 28 June 1948

General characteristics
- Class & type: LST-542-class tank landing ship
- Displacement: 1,625 long tons (1,651 t) light; 3,640 long tons (3,698 t) full
- Length: 328 ft (100 m)
- Beam: 50 ft (15 m)
- Draft: Unloaded: 2 ft 4 in (0.71 m) forward; 7 ft 6 in (2.29 m) aft; Loaded: 8 ft 2 in (2.49 m) forward; 14 ft 1 in (4.29 m) aft
- Propulsion: 2 × General Motors 12-567 diesel engines, two shafts, twin rudders
- Speed: 12 knots (22 km/h; 14 mph)
- Boats & landing craft carried: 2 × LCVPs
- Troops: 8-10 officers, 89-100 enlisted men
- Complement: Approximately 130 officers and enlisted men
- Armament: 1 × single 3"/50 caliber gun; 8 × 40 mm guns; 12 × 20 mm guns

USS LST-1022 was an LST-542-class tank landing ship built for the United States Navy during World War II.

The ship was laid down on 18 April 1944, at the Fore River Shipyard of the Bethlehem Shipbuilding Corporation in Quincy, Massachusetts, launched on 16 May 1944, and commissioned on 24 May 1944.

== Service history ==
During World War II, LST-1022 was assigned to the Asiatic-Pacific theater and participated in the assault and occupation of Okinawa Gunto in June 1945. Following the war, LST-1022 performed occupation duty in the Far East until early August 1946.

Decommissioned on 31 December 1947 she was struck from the Naval Vessel Register on 22 January 1948, and sold for scrapping on 28 June 1948 to R. G. Greive.

== Awards ==
LST-1022 earned one battle star for World War II service.
