= USS LST-869 =

1944 LST-542-class tank landing ship

History

United States
- Name: LST-869
- Builder: Jeffersonville Boat & Machinery Co., Jeffersonville, Indiana
- Laid down: 27 October 1944
- Launched: 11 December 1944
- Commissioned: 6 January 1945
- Decommissioned: 31 July 1946
- Stricken: 28 August 1946
- Fate: Sold, 26 December 1947, still active in the Paraná River as the barge MV Rio Turbio.

General characteristics
- Class & type: LST-542-class tank landing ship
- Displacement: 1,490 long tons (1,514 t) light; 4,080 long tons (4,145 t) full
- Length: 328 ft (100 m)
- Beam: 50 ft (15 m)
- Draft: 8 ft (2.4 m) forward; 14 ft 4 in (4.37 m) aft
- Propulsion: 2 × General Motors 12-567 diesel engines, two shafts
- Speed: 10.8 knots (20.0 km/h; 12.4 mph)
- Complement: 7 officers, 104 enlisted men
- Armament: 6 × 40 mm guns; 6 × 20 mm guns

USS LST-869 was an LST-542-class tank landing ship in the United States Navy. Like many of her class, she was not named and is properly referred to by her hull designation.

LST-869 was laid down on 27 October 1944 at Jeffersonville, Indiana, by the Jeffersonville Boat & Machinery Co.; launched on 11 December 1944; sponsored by Mrs. Janie G. Ray; and commissioned on 6 January 1945.

== Service history ==
LST-869 apparently did not see combat service during World War II.

Following World War II, LST-869 performed occupation duty in the Far East and saw service in China until mid-April 1946. She returned to the United States and was decommissioned on 31 July 1946 and struck from the Navy list on 28 August that same year.

On 26 December 1947, the ship was sold to Pablo N. Ferrari & Co. for operation, and was transferred to Pablo N. Ferrari & Co. of Argentina as MV Doña Michaela.

The ship returned to naval service, this time for Argentina, as ARA BDT No.8 in 1952 when sold to the navy for use as a collier. During this period of her career, she suffered hull damage during low tide at Rio Gallegos dock while loaded with 3,000 tons of coal in November 1955. After emergency repairs, she continued carrying coal from Argentinian mines until she was retired in 1963. She was then sold back into civilian service on 14 January 1965 and converted to a sand dredge with the name MV Rio Turbio, and worked in the Paraná River. On 12 May 2012, she was rammed accidentally by the tugboat Ava Payagua, which was pushing two barges through a turn in the river. The collision caused Rio Turbio to capsize and sink, with only her propellers visible above the surface. Of the 14-man crew, half survived. The ship was refloated and towed to the RIOPAL shipyard, repaired, and returned to service; Rio Turbio remains active in the Paraná River as of September 2023.
