= USS LST-382 =

LST-1-class landing ship tank

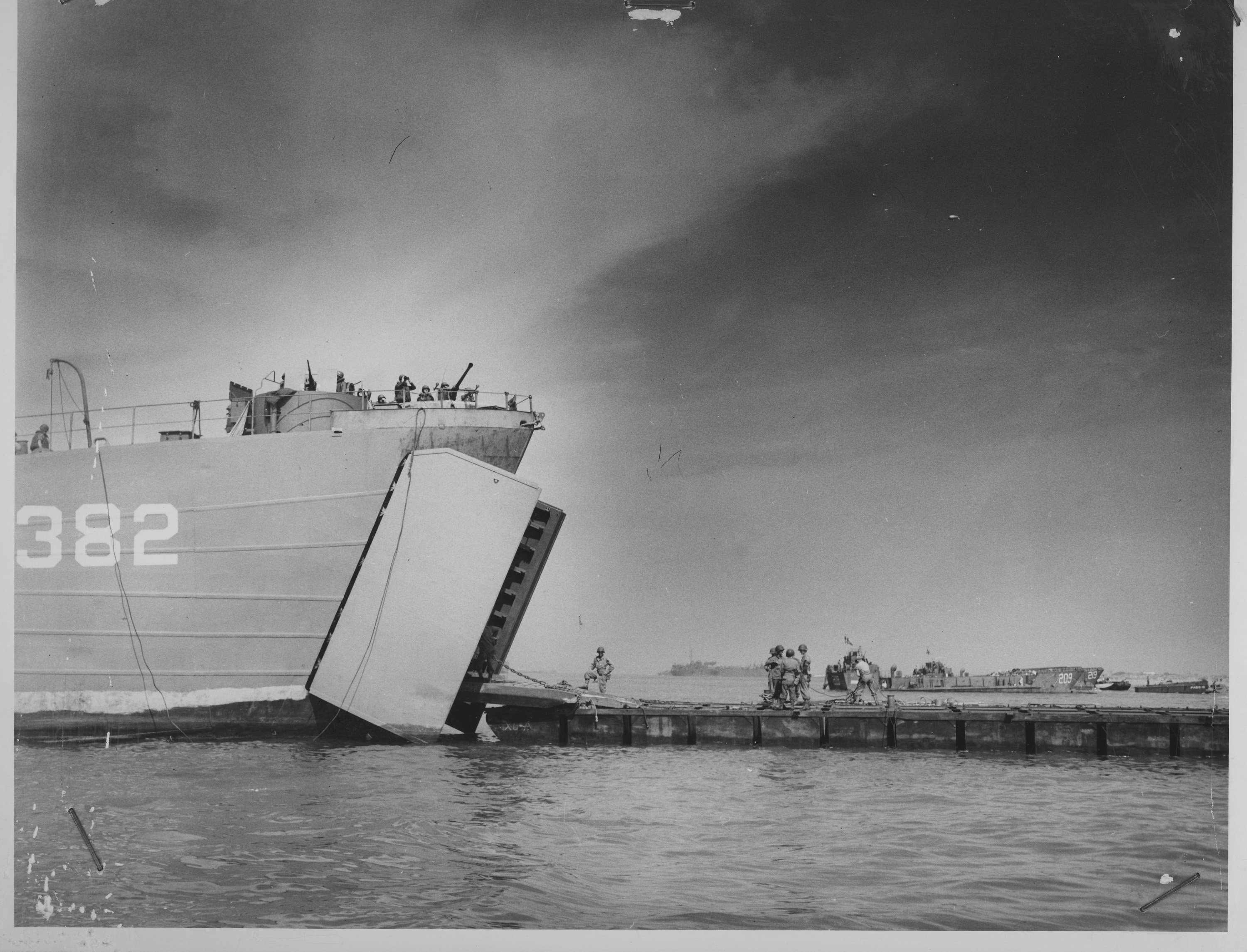
- USS LST-382 in Salerno, September 1943

History

United States
- Name: LST-382
- Builder: Bethlehem Steel Co., Quincy
- Laid down: 10 December 1942
- Launched: 3 February 1943
- Sponsored by: Mrs. Emily F. Cass
- Commissioned: 18 February 1943
- Decommissioned: 29 November 1944
- Stricken: 28 April 1949
- Identification: Callsign: NCAE
- Honors and awards: See Awards
- Fate: Transferred to Royal Navy, 29 November 1944

History

United Kingdom
- Name: LST-382
- Commissioned: 29 November 1944
- Decommissioned: 1946
- Fate: Returned to the United States

History

France
- Name: La Paillotte
- Namesake: La Paillotte
- Commissioned: 23 January 1948
- Identification: Pennant number: LST-382
- Fate: Scrapped

General characteristics
- Class & type: LST-1-class tank landing ship
- Displacement: 4,080 long tons (4,145 t) full load; 2,160 long tons (2,190 t) landing
- Length: 328 ft (100 m) oa
- Beam: 50 ft (15 m)
- Draft: Full load: 8 ft 2 in (2.49 m) forward; 14 ft 1 in (4.29 m) aft; Landing at 2,160 t: 3 ft 11 in (1.19 m) forward; 9 ft 10 in (3.00 m) aft
- Installed power: 2 × 900 hp (670 kW) Electro-Motive Diesel 12-567A diesel engines; 1,700 shp (1,300 kW)
- Propulsion: 1 × Falk main reduction gears; 2 × Propellers
- Speed: 12 kn (22 km/h; 14 mph)
- Range: 24,000 nmi (44,000 km; 28,000 mi) at 9 kn (17 km/h; 10 mph) while displacing 3,960 long tons (4,024 t)
- Boats & landing craft carried: 2 or 6 x LCVPs
- Capacity: 2,100 tons oceangoing maximum; 350 tons main deckload
- Troops: 16 officers, 147 enlisted men
- Complement: 13 officers, 104 enlisted men
- Armament: Varied, ultimate armament; 2 × twin 40 mm (1.57 in) Bofors guns; 4 × single 40 mm Bofors guns; 12 × 20 mm (0.79 in) Oerlikon cannons

USS LST-382 was a LST-1-class tank landing ship in the United States Navy during World War II. She was later sold to France as La Paillotte (LST-382).

== Construction and career ==
LST-382 was laid down on 10 December 1942 at Bethlehem Steel Co., Quincy, Massachusetts. Launched on 3 February 1943 and commissioned on 18 February 1943.

=== Service in the United States ===
During World War II, LST-382 was assigned to the Europe-Africa-Middle East theater. She took part in the Invasion of Sicilian from 9 to 15 July 1943 and the Salerno landings from 9 to 21 September 1943.

She participated in the Invasion of Normandy from 6 to 25 June 1944.

LST-382 was decommissioned on 29 December 1944 and transferred to the Royal Navy.

She was struck from the Navy Register on 28 April 1949.

=== Service in the United Kingdom ===
HMS LST-382 was commissioned on 18 December 1944 and was part of W Task Force which participated in the invasion of Malaya.

She was returned to the United States n 1946 and leased to France on 23 January 1948.

=== Service in France ===
She was transferred to the French Navy and commissioned on 23 January 1948 with the same name LST-382.

In 1950s, she was given the name La Paillotte (LST-347).

La Paillotte took part in the First Indochina War between 19 December 1946 to 1 August 1954.

The ship was out of service and sold for scrap.

== Awards ==
LST-382 have earned the following awards:

- American Campaign Medal
- Europe-Africa-Middle East Campaign Medal (3 battle stars)
- World War II Victory Medal

== Sources ==
- United States. Dept. of the Treasury (1962). Treasury Decisions Under the Customs, Internal Revenue, Industrial Alcohol, Narcotic and Other Laws, Volume 97. U.S. Government Printing Office.
- Moore, Capt. John (1984). Jane's Fighting Ships 1984-85. Jane's Information Group. ISBN 978-0710607959.
- Saunders, Stephen (2009). Jane's Fighting Ships 2009-2010. Jane's Information Group. ISBN 978-0710628886.
- Fairplay International Shipping Journal Volume 222. United Kingdom: Fairplay Publishing Limited. 1967.
