= USS LST-7 =

1942 LST-1-class tank landing ship

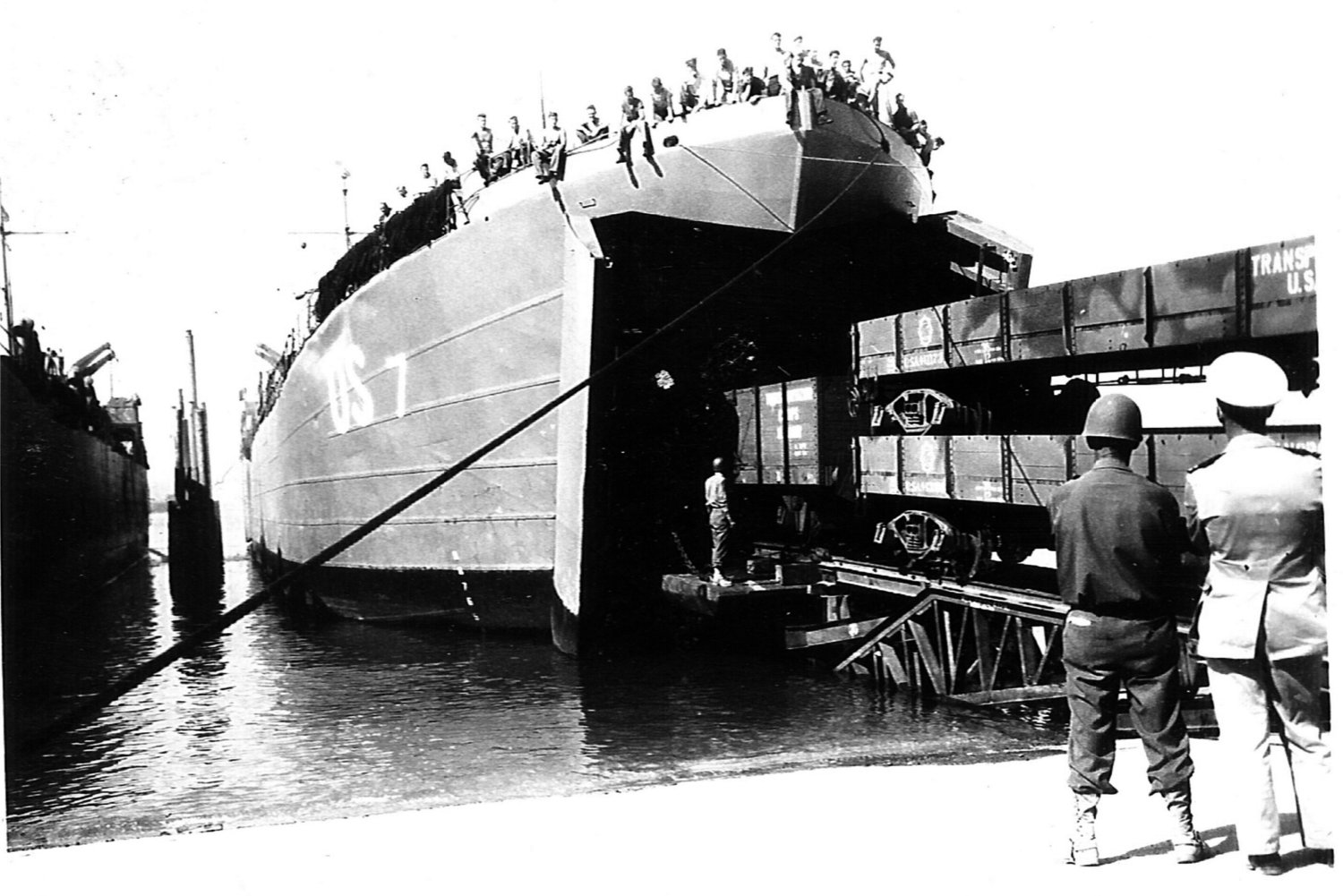
- USS LST-7 unloading railroad rolling stock at Cherbourg, France, date unknown.

History

United States
- Name: LST-7
- Builder: Dravo Corporation, Pittsburgh, Pennsylvania
- Laid down: 17 July 1942
- Launched: 31 October 1942
- Sponsored by: Mrs. Anna Marvin
- Commissioned: 2 March 1943
- Decommissioned: 21 May 1946
- Stricken: 19 June 1946
- Identification: Hull symbol: LST-7; Code letters: NFSV
- Honors and awards: 3 × battle stars
- Fate: Sold for scrapping, 7 October 1947

General characteristics
- Type: LST-1-class tank landing ship
- Displacement: 4,080 long tons (4,145 t) full load; 2,160 long tons (2,190 t) landing
- Length: 328 ft (100 m) oa
- Beam: 50 ft (15 m)
- Draft: Full load: 8 ft 2 in (2.49 m) forward; 14 ft 1 in (4.29 m) aft; Landing at 2,160 t: 3 ft 11 in (1.19 m) forward; 9 ft 10 in (3.00 m) aft
- Installed power: 2 × 900 hp (670 kW) Electro-Motive Diesel 12-567A diesel engines; 1,700 shp (1,300 kW)
- Propulsion: 1 × Falk main reduction gears; 2 × Propellers
- Speed: 12 kn (22 km/h; 14 mph)
- Range: 24,000 nmi (44,000 km; 28,000 mi) at 9 kn (17 km/h; 10 mph) while displacing 3,960 long tons (4,024 t)
- Boats & landing craft carried: 2 or 6 x LCVPs
- Capacity: 2,100 tons oceangoing maximum; 350 tons main deckload
- Troops: 16 officers, 147 enlisted men
- Complement: 13 officers, 104 enlisted men
- Armament: Varied, ultimate armament; 2 × twin 40 mm (1.57 in) Bofors guns; 4 × single 40 mm Bofors guns; 12 × 20 mm (0.79 in) Oerlikon cannons

Service record
- Operations: Sicilian occupation (9–15 July 1943); Salerno landings (9–21 September 1943); Invasion of Normandy (6–25 June 1944)

USS LST-7 was an LST-1-class tank landing ship of the United States Navy built during World War II. Like many of her class, she was not named and is properly referred to by her hull designation.

== Construction ==
LST-7 was laid down on 17 July 1942, at Pittsburgh, Pennsylvania, by the Dravo Corporation; launched on 31 October 1942; sponsored by Mrs. Anna Marvin; and commissioned on 2 March 1943.

== Service history ==
LST-7 was assigned to the Mediterranean Theater and European Theater and participated in the following operations: Allied invasion of Sicily in July 1943; Salerno Landings in September 1943; and the Invasion of Normandy in June 1944.

== Final disposition ==
LST-7 was decommissioned on 21 May 1946, and was struck from the Navy list on 19 June 1946. On 7 October 1947, she was sold to Mr. L. Lewis Green Jr., of Charleston, South Carolina, for scrapping.

== Awards ==
LST-7 earned three battle star for World War II service.

== Bibliography ==
- "LST-7". Dictionary of American Naval Fighting Ships. Naval History and Heritage Command. This article incorporates text from this source, which is in the public domain.
- "LST-7". NavSource. 12 May 2017.
