= USS LST-997 =

Tank landing ship

History

United States
- Name: USS LST-999
- Laid down: 27 March 1944
- Launched: 12 May 1944
- Commissioned: 27 June 1944
- Decommissioned: 7 March 1947
- Fate: Sold, 15 June 1948
- Stricken: 4 April 1947
- Honours and awards: one battle star

General characteristics
- Class & type: LST-542-class LST
- Displacement: 1,490 tons (light); 4,080 tons (full load of 2,100 tons)
- Length: 328 ft (100 m)
- Beam: 50 ft (15 m)
- Draft: 8 ft (2.4 m) forward; 14 ft 4 in (4.37 m) (full load)
- Propulsion: Two diesel engines, two shafts
- Speed: 10.8 knots (20 km/h) (max); 9 knots (17 km/h) (econ)
- Complement: 7 officers, 204 enlisted
- Armament: 8 × 40 mm guns; 12 × 20 mm guns

USS LST-997 was an LST-542-class tank landing ship in the United States Navy. Like many of her class, she was not named and is properly referred to by her hull designation.

LST-997 was laid down on 27 March 1944 at the Boston Navy Yard; launched on 12 May 1944; sponsored by Mrs. Victoria V. Lynn; and commissioned on 27 May 1944.

During World War II, LST-997 was assigned to the European theater and participated in the Operation Dragoon, the invasion of southern France, in August and September 1944. Following the war, she performed occupation duty in the Far East until mid-November 1945. She returned to the United States and was decommissioned on 7 March 1947 and struck from the Navy list on 4 April that same year. On 15 June 1948, the ship was sold to Consolidated Builders, Inc., Seattle, Washington, for scrapping.

Following World War II LST-997 performed occupation duty in the Far East until mid-September 1945.

LST-997 earned one battle star for World War II service.
