= USS LST-992 =

1944 LST-542-class tank landing ship

History

United States
- Name: USS LST-992
- Builder: Boston Navy Yard
- Laid down: 5 March 1944
- Launched: 7 April 1944
- Commissioned: 10 May 1944
- Decommissioned: 9 August 1946
- Stricken: 25 September 1946
- Honours and awards: 1 battle star (World War II)
- Fate: Sold for scrapping, 13 June 1948

General characteristics
- Class & type: LST-542-class tank landing ship
- Displacement: 1,490 long tons (1,514 t) light; 4,080 long tons (4,145 t) full
- Length: 328 ft (100 m)
- Beam: 50 ft (15 m)
- Draft: 8 ft (2.4 m) forward; 14 ft 4 in (4.37 m) aft
- Propulsion: 2 × General Motors 12-567 diesel engines, two shafts
- Speed: 10.8 knots (20.0 km/h; 12.4 mph)
- Complement: 7 officers, 104 enlisted men
- Armament: 6 × 40 mm guns; 6 × 20 mm guns

USS LST-992 was an LST-542-class tank landing ship in the United States Navy. Like many of her class, she was not named and is properly referred to by her hull designation.

LST-992 was laid down on 5 March 1944 at the Boston Navy Yard; launched on 7 April 1944; sponsored by Mrs. Frances C. Landers; and commissioned on 10 May 1944.

== Service history ==
During World War II, LST-992 was assigned to the Asiatic-Pacific theater and participated in the assault and occupation of Okinawa Gunto in June 1945. Following the war, she performed occupation duty in the Far East and saw service in China until early April 1946. She returned to the United States and was decommissioned on 9 August 1946 and struck from the Navy list on 25 September that same year. On 13 June 1948, the ship was sold to the Walter W. Johnson Co. for scrapping.

LST-992 earned one battle star for World War II service.
