= USS LST-355 =

LST-1-class tank landing ship

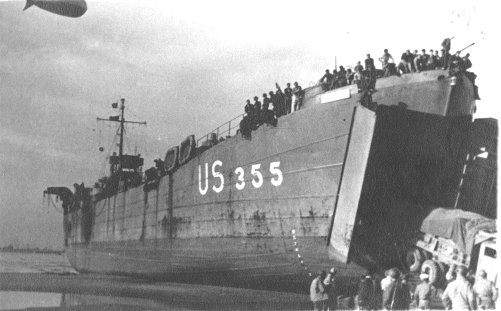
- USS LST-355 unloading trucks while high and dry on the beach at Normandy, circa June 1944.

History

United States
- Name: USS LST-355
- Builder: Charleston Navy Yard
- Laid down: 7 September 1942
- Launched: 16 November 1942
- Sponsored by: Mrs. Wendell E. Kraft
- Commissioned: 22 December 1942
- Decommissioned: 6 March 1946
- Stricken: 31 October 1947
- Honours and awards: 2 battle stars
- Fate: Sold for scrap, 10 April 1948

General characteristics
- Class & type: LST-1-class tank landing ship
- Displacement: 4,080 long tons (4,145 t) full
- Length: 328 ft (100 m)
- Beam: 50 ft (15 m)
- Draft: Light : 2 ft 4 in (0.71 m) forward; 7 ft 6 in (2.29 m) aft; Sea-going : 8 ft 3 in (2.51 m) forward; 14 ft 1 in (4.29 m) aft; Landing : 3 ft 11 in (1.19 m) forward; 9 ft 10 in (3.00 m) aft
- Propulsion: 2 × General Motors 900 hp (671 kW) 12-567 diesel engines, 2 shafts, twin rudders
- Speed: 12 knots (22 km/h; 14 mph)
- Range: 24,000 nmi (44,000 km) at 9 kn (17 km/h; 10 mph) while displacing 3960 tons
- Complement: 9 officers, 120 enlisted
- Armament: 2 × twin 40 mm gun mounts w/Mk.51 directors; 4 × single 40 mm gun mounts; 12 × single 20 mm gun mounts

USS LST-355 was an LST-1-class tank landing ship of the United States Navy active during the Second World War.

She was laid down in September 1942 at the Charleston Navy Yard, sponsored by Mrs. Wendell E. Kraft and commissioned in December 1942.

LST-355 first saw service at the invasion of Sicily in July 1943, and then at the Salerno landings in September. In 1944 she moved to England to support the Normandy landings, landing on Omaha Beach on D-Day.

Following the end of the war, she served on occupation duties in the Far East, before being decommissioned in March 1946 and sold for scrapping in April 1948 to Consolidated Builders in Seattle.
