= USS LST-547 =

1944 LST-542-class tank landing ship

History

United States
- Name: USS LST-547
- Builder: Missouri Valley Bridge and Iron Company, Evansville, Indiana
- Laid down: 24 December 1943
- Launched: 19 February 1944
- Sponsored by: Mrs. Harold Jourdan
- Commissioned: 30 March 1944
- Decommissioned: 28 February 1946
- Stricken: 31 October 1947
- Fate: Sold for scrapping 26 May 1948

General characteristics
- Class & type: LST-542-class tank landing ship
- Displacement: 1,490 long tons (1,514 t) light; 4,080 long tons (4,145 t) full
- Length: 328 ft (100 m)
- Beam: 50 ft (15 m)
- Draft: Unloaded 2 ft 4 in (0.71 m) bow; 7 ft 6 in (2.29 m) stern; Full load: 8 ft 2 in (2.49 m) forward; 14 ft 1 in (4.29 m) aft
- Installed power: 1,800 horsepower (1.34 megawatts)
- Propulsion: Two 900-horsepower (0.67-megawatt) General Motors 12-567 diesel engines, two shafts, twin rudders
- Speed: 12 knots (22 km/h; 14 mph)
- Boats & landing craft carried: 2 x LCVPs
- Troops: 16 officers and 147 enlisted men
- Complement: 7 officers, 104 enlisted men
- Armament: 2 × twin 40 mm gun mounts; 4 × single 40-millimeter gun mounts; 12 × 20 mm guns

USS LST-547 was a United States Navy LST-542-class tank landing ship in commission from 1944 to 1946.

== Construction and commissioning ==
LST-547 was laid down on 24 December 1943 at Evansville, Indiana, by the Missouri Valley Bridge and Iron Company. She was launched on 19 February 1944, sponsored by Mrs. Harold Jourdan, and commissioned on 30 March 1944.

== Service history ==
LST-547 was assigned to the Pacific Theater of Operations during World War II. She saw no combat action.

Following the war, LST-547 performed occupation duty in the Far East and until mid-February 1946, when she returned to the United States.

== Decommissioning and disposal ==
LST-547 was decommissioned on 28 February 1946 and stricken from the Navy List on 31 October 1947. On 26 May 1948, she was sold to the Bethlehem Steel Company of Bethlehem, Pennsylvania, for scrapping.
