= USS LST-999 =

1944 LST-542-class tank landing ship

History

United States
- Name: USS LST-999
- Laid down: 8 April 1944
- Launched: 14 May 1944
- Commissioned: 30 June 1944
- Decommissioned: 29 July 1946
- Fate: Sold, 3 November 1947
- Stricken: 25 September 1946
- Honours and awards: three battle stars

General characteristics
- Class & type: LST-542-class LST
- Displacement: 1,490 tons (light); 4,080 tons (full load of 2,100 tons)
- Length: 328 ft (100 m)
- Beam: 50 ft (15 m)
- Draft: 8 ft (2.4 m) forward; 14 ft 4 in (4.37 m) aft (full load)
- Propulsion: Two diesel engines, two shafts
- Speed: 10.8 knots (20 km/h) (max); 9 knots (17 km/h) (econ)
- Complement: 7 officers, 204 enlisted
- Armament: 8 × 40 mm guns; 12 × 20 mm guns

USS LST-999 was an LST-542-class tank landing ship in the United States Navy. Like many of her class, she was not named and is properly referred to by her hull designation.

LST-999 was laid down on 8 April 1944 at the Boston Navy Yard; launched on 14 May 1944; and commissioned on 30 May 1944.

During World War II LST-999 was assigned to the Asiatic-Pacific theater and participated in the following operations:

Leyte landings—October 1944
Mindanao Island landings—April 1945
Assault and occupation of Okinawa Gunto — March through June 1945

LST-999 returned to the United States and was decommissioned on 29 July 1946 and struck from the Navy list on 25 September that same year. 3 November 1947, the ship was sold to Dulien Steel Products, Inc., Seattle, Wash., for scrapping.

LST-999 earned three battle stars for World War II service.
