= USS LST-713 =

American tank-landing ship

History

United States
- Name: USS LST-713
- Builder: Jeffersonville Boat & Machine Co., Jeffersonville, Indiana
- Laid down: 3 June 1944
- Launched: 11 July 1944
- Commissioned: 7 August 1944
- Decommissioned: 20 June 1946
- Stricken: 31 July 1946
- Honors and awards: 2 battle stars (World War II)
- Fate: Sold for scrapping, 21 May 1948

General characteristics
- Class & type: LST-542-class tank landing ship
- Displacement: 1,625 long tons (1,651 t) light; 3,640 long tons (3,698 t) full
- Length: 328 ft (100 m)
- Beam: 50 ft (15 m)
- Draft: Unloaded : 2 ft 4 in (0.71 m) forward; 7 ft 6 in (2.29 m) aft; Loaded : 8 ft 2 in (2.49 m) forward; 14 ft 1 in (4.29 m) aft
- Propulsion: 2 × General Motors 12-567 diesel engines, two shafts, twin rudders
- Speed: 12 knots (22 km/h; 14 mph)
- Boats & landing craft carried: 2 × LCVPs
- Troops: 8-10 officers, 89-100 enlisted men
- Complement: Approximately 130 officers and enlisted men
- Armament: 8 × 40 mm guns; 12 × 20 mm guns

USS LST-713 was an LST-542-class tank landing ship built for the United States Navy during World War II.

The ship was laid down on 3 June 1944 at the Jefferson Boat & Machine Company in Jeffersonville, Indiana; she was launched on 11 July 1944 and commissioned on 7 August 1944.

Some of the last known photographs of LST-713 were taken in February 1945, where she appears in three photographs that were taken off to coast of Iwo Jima, Japan during the invasion.

== Service history ==
During World War II, LST-713 was assigned to the Asiatic-Pacific Theater. She participated in two operations: the Battle of Iwo Jima in February 1945, and the assault and occupation of Okinawa Gunto, which took place from April to June 1945. Following the war, LST-713 performed occupation duty in the Far East until February 1946.

She returned to the United States and was decommissioned on 20 June 1946, and struck from the Navy List on 31 July that same year. On 21 May 1948, the ship was sold to the Bethlehem Steel Corporation of Bethlehem, Pennsylvania, and subsequently scrapped.

== Awards ==
USS LST-713 earned two battle stars for World War II service.

1 Combat Action Ribbon

1 American Campaign Medal

2 Asiatic-Pacific Campaigns Medal

1 World War 2 Victory Medal

1 Navy Occupation Medal
