= USS LST-989 =

U.S. World War II-era tank landing ship

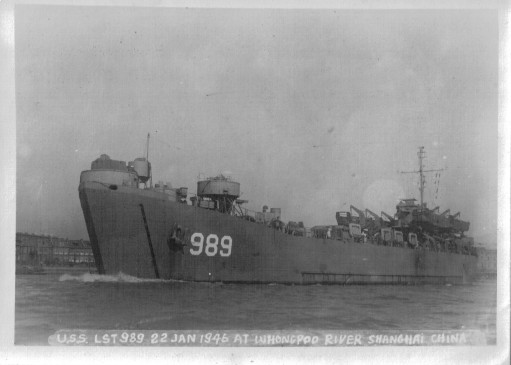

History

United States
- Name: LST-989
- Builder: Boston Navy Yard
- Laid down: 10 February 1944
- Launched: 12 March 1944
- Commissioned: 28 April 1944
- Decommissioned: 7 October 1946
- Stricken: 13 November 1946
- Honours and awards: 1 battle star (World War II)
- Fate: Sold, 25 June 1948

General characteristics
- Class & type: LST-542-class tank landing ship
- Displacement: 1,490 long tons (1,514 t) light; 4,080 long tons (4,145 t) full
- Length: 328 ft (100 m)
- Beam: 50 ft (15 m)
- Draft: 8 ft (2.4 m) forward; 14 ft 4 in (4.37 m) aft
- Propulsion: 2 × General Motors 12-567 diesel engines, two shafts
- Speed: 10.8 knots (20.0 km/h; 12.4 mph)
- Complement: 7 officers, 104 enlisted men
- Armament: 6 × 40 mm guns; 6 × 20 mm guns

USS LST-989 was an LST-542-class tank landing ship in the United States Navy. Like many of her class, she was not named and is properly referred to by her hull designation.

LST-989 was laid down on 10 February 1944 at the Boston Navy Yard; launched on 12 March 1944; sponsored by Mrs. Arthur L. Anderson; and commissioned on 28 April 1944.

== Service history ==
During World War II, LST-989 was assigned to the European theater and participated in the invasion of southern France in August and September 1944. Following the war, LST-989 performed occupation duty in the Far East and saw service in China until mid-April 1946. She was decommissioned on 7 October 1946 and struck from the Navy list on 13 November that same year. On 25 June 1948, the ship was sold to the Humble Oil & Refining Co., of Houston, Texas, for operation.

LST-989 earned one battle star for World War II service.
