= Landing Ship, Tank (Hospital) =

A Landing Ship, Tank (Hospital) (LSTH) was a Tank Landing Ship (LST) converted to act as a hospital ship, but because they retained armaments they were not officially designated as such. The LST was a vessel designed to beach itself and unload equipment, vehicles, tanks, and troops onto an enemy beach. The convenience of a ship beached ashore proved to be a giant morale booster for the sick and injured, who could simply walk aboard.

== Background ==
On D-Day most of the troops were not landed by LSTs, however 41,035 wounded were brought back on approximately 150 of such ships over the next 114 days, which was twice their troop capacity. The sheer numbers overwhelmed the modest sick bay facilities on these craft, which were staffed by one or two Pharmacist Mates. The troops' berthing quickly filled to capacity with walking wounded and litter patients laid on the tank deck. Further, the inclusion of refugees on LSTs created additional needs, such as an Italian woman who gave birth at sea.

== Augmenting LSTs ==
Future operations in the Pacific sought to reduce these problems by augmenting several LSTs with surgical teams to treat unstable patients. Occasionally referred to as LST Hospitals, these surgically augmented LSTs carried troops into battle and, upon unloading, set up an organized hospital on the well deck. During the battles of Tarawa, Iwo Jima, Philippines, and Okinawa, surgical teams consisting of at first three and then five physicians as well as 35 Pharmacist Mates were attached to LSTs.

== Designation of LST as hospitals ==
In preparation for Operation Olympic, the initial invasion of Japan planned for 1 November 1945, 36 LSTs were to be redesignated LSTHs. These ships were to be augmented with a surgical team and provided large amounts of consumable and medical personnel to meet the anticipated demand for beachhead casualty evacuation. The official written order for redesignation took effect 15 September 1945, 13 days after the end of the war. All 36 LSTHs were assigned duty in Asia and the Far East, but their designation served merely a formality as their new mission was to return US troops. Many did receive a large contingent of Pharmacist Mates by the month's end. By the end of May 1946, the last three LSTHs departed the Far East as part of the Magic Carpet fleet. Of the LSTs, one ship was converted to a "first aid ship" at the discretion of Vice Admiral Daniel E. Barbey, USN, Commander 7th Amphibious Force during 1943.

== Refitting the LSTH ==
USS LST-464 was converted at Sydney in 1943 into a dedicated "first-aid ship", the only one of her kind used. LST-464 carried no troops nor combat equipment, and functioned as a casualty evacuation ship during invasion, a station hospital ship in port, and an ambulance ship to transfer patients to a base hospital. She was designated only by the 6-foot-tall (1.8 m) numbers "464" painted on her hull amidships.

The modified tank deck was refitted and housed a complete and fixed hospital facility which extended into the ship through new water tight doors on the port and starboard sides of the tank deck. The tank deck, now hospital, contained a receiving or triage area, 78 hospital beds and accommodations (washrooms, toilets, increased galley), refrigerators, and a surgical suite. The ship was equipped with specialist consultation and out-patient care at all times, including: radiology, pharmacy, laboratory, eye refractions, dental care, a blood bank, and stores for 25 tons of medical supplies. Staff was increased to 6 physicians, one dentist and a complement of corpsmen. In comparison, during the Normandy campaign most LSTs had one or two Corpsmen. Above deck the ship looked as any other LST, and because of her armament she was not considered a hospital ship in compliance with the Geneva Convention.

Following the surrender of Japan, LST-464 was redesignated LST(H)-464 on 15 September 1945.

Later, during the Vietnam War, the Saginaw (LST-1188) tested the idea of hoisting and opening a MUST (Medical Unit Self-contained Transportable). The purpose of a MUST was to allow an LST to set up complete hospital facilities after unloading troops, to provide in-close support hospital facilities in a combat zone.

== Other LSTHs ==
- LSTH-19
- LSTH-23
- LSTH-38
- LSTH-41
- LSTH-42
- LSTH-84
- LSTH-117
- LSTH-118
- LSTH-121
- LSTH-123
- LSTH-205
- LSTH-213
- LSTH-222
- LSTH-242
- LSTH-243
- LSTH-247
- LSTH-268
- LSTH-276
- LSTH-450
- LSTH-464
- LSTH-477
- LSTH-482
- LSTH-486
- LSTH-488
- LSTH-652
- LSTH-731
- LSTH-790
- LSTH-871
- LSTH-929
- LSTH-930
- LSTH-931
- LSTH-949
- LSTH-950
- LSTH-951
- LSTH-952
- LSTH-1033

== See also ==
- List of United States Navy hospital ships
- List of United States Navy LSTs
