= USS Warrick =

Cargo ship of the United States Navy

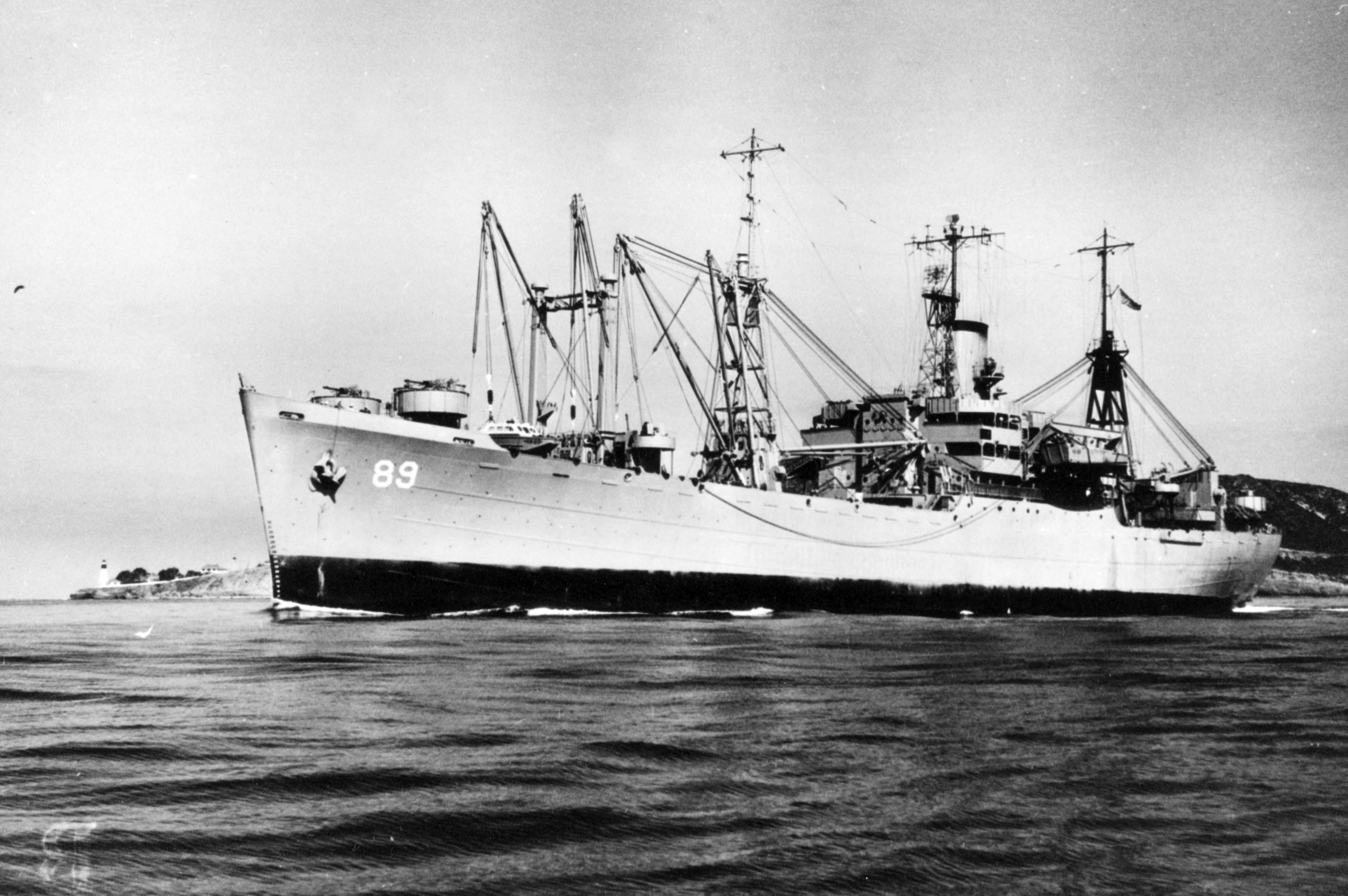

History

United States
- Name: USS Warrick
- Namesake: Warrick County, Indiana
- Builder: Moore Dry Dock Company, Oakland, California
- Laid down: 7 April 1944
- Launched: 29 May 1944
- Commissioned: 30 August 1944
- Decommissioned: 3 December 1957
- Stricken: 1 July 1961
- Honours and awards: 2 battle stars (World War II); 1 battle star (Korea)
- Fate: Reacquired by the Navy, 20 April 1971; Sunk as a target ship, 28 May 1971

General characteristics
- Class & type: Andromeda-class attack cargo ship
- Type: Type C2-S-B1
- Displacement: 13,910 long tons (14,133 t) full
- Length: 459 ft 1 in (139.93 m)
- Beam: 63 ft (19 m)
- Draft: 26 ft 4 in (8.03 m)
- Speed: 16.5 knots (30.6 km/h; 19.0 mph)
- Complement: 366
- Armament: 1 × 5"/38 caliber gun mount; 4 × twin 40 mm gun mounts; 16 × 20 mm gun mounts

USS Warrick (AKA-89) was an Andromeda-class attack cargo ship in service with the United States Navy from 1944 to 1957. She was sunk as a target in 1971.

== History ==
Warrick — originally named Black Prince — was named after Warrick County, Indiana. She was laid down under a Maritime Commission contract (MC hull 1189) on 7 April 1944 at Oakland, California, by the Moore Dry Dock Co., launched on 29 May 1944, sponsored by Mrs. C. Wells Haren, and acquired and simultaneously commissioned by the Navy on 30 August 1944, at the Moore Dry Dock Company's west yard.

=== World War II, 1944–1945 ===
After loading stores at the Naval Supply Depot, Oakland, Warrick underwent a two-week shakedown out of San Pedro, California, concluding that necessary period of familiarization and training on 25 September. She subsequently conducted practice landings at San Clemente Island before undergoing repairs and alterations between 13 and 20 October. Taking on cargo at Wilmington, California, on the 24th, Warrick departed the west coast at 1430 the following day, bound for Manus in the Admiralties.

The ship visited Manus, Hollandia, Finschhafen, and Langemak Bay, New Guinea; and Manus a second time before she returned to Hollandia to offload the 333 tons of general Army cargo. She then again shifted to Finschhafen, arriving at 1635 on 1 December. There, she loaded 1,137 tons of Army equipment — mostly vehicles — and, on the day after Christmas, embarked 17 officers and 210 enlisted men (Army) at Langemak Bay. After fueling on the 27th, Warrick sailed for Manus, joined Tryon (APH-1) en route, and rendezvoused with Task Group (TG) 77.9 on the 28th.

Warrick stopped at Manus from 29 December 1944 to 2 January 1945, before getting underway on the latter day for Lingayen Gulf, on the northern coast of the island of Luzon, in the Philippines. En route, her convoy's escorts picked up three submarine contacts and depth charged them without obtaining results. No air attacks came the way of TG 77.9, fortunately, as American amphibious forces converged on Lingayen Gulf.

Warrick reached her destination at 0500 on 11 January and came to anchor at 0830. One hour later, she commenced offloading her cargo, some two days after the first of the Army troops under the overall command of General Douglas MacArthur had splashed ashore at Lingayen. Warrick continued her unloading of cargo over the next day. Landing craft, LCVP's and LCM's, from Warren (APA-53) assisted in the unloading, continuing that task until 2200, when the operation ceased due to two factors: contact with her beach party had been lost and the beach itself was reportedly coming under shellfire.

After resuming the unloading on the 13th, Warrick completed her assigned duties by 1015. Taking the boats on board from 1040, Warrick got underway for Leyte Island, joining Task Unit (TU) 78.11.3 formed around Mount McKinley (AGC-7) at 1745. She reached Leyte on the 16th.

The attack cargo ship took on board two LCVP's from the attack transport Oconto (APA-187) to replace boats which she had lost at Lingayen Gulf on the 17th. She departed the Philippines on the 19th, bound for the Carolines.

Reaching Ulithi on 23 January, Warrick fueled from Merrimack (AO-37) on 1 February, five days before she headed for the Marianas. Arriving at Guam on 8 February, the attack cargo ship began loading cargo and embarking troops two days later. Her load was a varied one: a transportation company, a tractor-trailer platoon, an engineer company, a war dog platoon, medical companies, ordnance repair units, replacement drafts of personnel, plus water, fuel, rations, and other supplies. With elements of the 3rd Marine Division thus embarked, Warrick got underway for Iwo Jima on 17 February.

As part of TU 51.1.1, the attack cargo ship participated in the Iwo Jima assault as part of TG 51.1, the Joint Expeditionary Force Reserve. Screened by four destroyers and two destroyer escorts, Warrick sailed for that soon-to-be-famous island in company with Transport Divisions 31 and 33. She arrived at point "Equity" on the 19th and, during ensuing days, cruised in operating area "Porch" in keeping with her reserve status. She moved in closer to Iwo Jima on the 22nd, but was still lying to, awaiting orders, on the following day. The attack cargo ship finally commenced unloading operations on the 24th in the transport area four miles off the southeastern coast of Iwo Jima.

Warrick hoisted out her boats at 0750 and commenced lowering them soon thereafter. She dispatched all of her LCM's to assist in the unloading of nearby attack transports. She soon learned over the voice radio, however, that the smaller LCVP's were showing a tendency to broach and break up on the steep beaches. Beach-masters were accordingly waving off the LCVP's so that the beaches would not become fouled with the wrecks of numerous landing craft, thus impeding the flow of supplies necessary to keep the marines advancing against the stubborn Japanese defenders. Thus, with no lighterage, Warrick did not start unloading her own cargo until the following day.

After returning from the night retirement area, the attack cargo ship hoisted out her boats at 0810 on the 25th. At that time, Warrick was noting that a strong sea was running with moderate to heavy swells, which, in connection with a good breeze, made unloading conditions decidedly unfavorable. LST-731 came alongside at 1245 but, on her attempt, carried away two debarkation ladders and stove in some of Warrick's hull plating at two spots on her starboard side. At 1315, on her second attempt, LST-731 secured alongside and commenced taking on cargo.

Over the next two days, beach conditions remained the same, with the small landing craft suffering considerably in the heavy swells, leading to many bans on craft the size of LCM's and LCVP's being waved off from the beachhead. Accordingly, LST's and LSM's were utilized as lighters for the cargo. Over the next few days, the ship offloaded her cargo to LCT-692 and LST-731. On 2 March, Warrick dispatched three LCM's to help unload ammunition from SS Columbia Victory. She then completed discharging cargo in ensuing days to LSM-266 and LSM-238. In addition, she embarked 23 Marine casualties from the beach and later transferred them to Doyen (APA-1). On 6 March, after transferring smoke pots to LST-646, Warrick cleared Iwo Jima, bound for the Marianas.

Sailing from thence to the Solomon Islands, the attack cargo ship reached Tulagi on 18 March. For the remainder of hostilities, Warrick performed her vital but unglamorous support role. She transported boats from Guam and Manus to Florida Island and New Guinea; lifted Army cargo and troops from Nouméa, New Caledonia, and New Guinea to Leyte, Cebu, and Manila, in the Philippines; and took return passengers to Manus. The end of hostilities in mid-August found the ship at Finschhafen, New Guinea.

=== Inter-war years, 1945–1950 ===
Between the end of World War II in the Pacific and the onset of the Korean War — a time span of a little under five years — Warrick operated primarily in the western Pacific and in the Far East. Soon after the Japanese surrender, the attack cargo ship made two trips from the Philippines to Honshū, Japan, touching at the ports of Aomori, Sasebo, and Yokosuka, carrying men and materiel to support the occupation of the erstwhile enemy's homeland. She participated in "Operation Magic Carpet" — the return of discharged sailors, marines, airmen, and soldiers to the United States — and later supported the occupation of China and Korea, visiting ports that ranged from Qingdao to Hong Kong; and Shanghai to Sasebo. In addition, during those "interwar" years, the attack cargo ship lifted cargo to such places as Johnston Island, Tarawa, Ponape, and Kwajalein. Besides performing her vital logistics functions, the ship also took part in exercises with the Fleet.

=== Korea and the Pacific Fleet, 1950–1957 ===
When elements of the North Korean People's Army crossed the 38th parallel into South Korean territory at 0400 on 25 June 1950, they triggered the Korean War. At that time, Warrick was in port at San Francisco. She sailed for the Marshalls on 1 July and made port at Eniwetok on the 14th. She subsequently returned, via Pearl Harbor, to the west coast of the United States on 8 August. On 16 July, while deployed to the western Pacific, she received orders to berth at the Naval Supply Center, Oakland, to load as fleet issue ship for the western Pacific.

Moored at the supply center from 10 August to 24 August, Warrick loaded balanced dry provisions sufficient for 20,000 men for 90 days; ships' store stock; clothing and small stores; general stores material; and a deck load of bottled gases. When the task was complete, she sailed for the Far East, leaving San Francisco behind on 24 August.

Diverted to Sasebo, Japan, en route, Warrick arrived at that port on 9 September and, from 10 September to 23 September, carried out duties of fleet issue supply ship. Attached to TF 79 on 11 September, the attack cargo ship sailed for the newly secured port of Inchon, North Korea, on 23 September, less than 10 days after American amphibious forces had attacked that port.

After performing her stores issue duties at Inchon from 25 September to 1 October, the attack cargo ship got underway to replenish ships of TF 77. Making contact with the fast carrier task force built around the carrier Valley Forge (CV-45), Warrick received the flattop alongside at 1143 on 2 October and commenced transferring cargo 12 minutes later. After delivering fleet freight, mail, napalm and drop tanks, Warrick set course to rendezvous with other men-of-war in the operating area off Korea's western coast.

After issuing stores to the veteran destroyer Fletcher (DDE-445) from 2335 on 2 October to 0040 on the 3rd, Warrick set a return course for Sasebo and arrived at that port on 4 October. She carried out her duties as stores issue ship there from 5 October to 8 October before returning to Inchon to provide round-the-clock replenishment services to the ships of TF 90 from 11 October to 14 October. "For performing an efficient job under adverse conditions", Warrick's commander wrote later, "Warrick received a 'well done.' "

Returning once more to Sasebo, the busy supply ship then proceeded to Buckner Bay, Okinawa, where she arrived on the 24th. She replenished stores of the seaplane tender Salisbury Sound (AV-13) before getting underway for Keelung, Formosa, on the 25th. Shifting to the Pescadores on the 28th, she arrived on the 29th to replenish the small seaplane tender Floyds Bay (AVP-40) at Shochi Wan anchorage. Underway for Okinawa at 1326 on 29 October, the ship received radio reports en route of the progress of typhoon "Ruby". Warned of the critical area, the attack cargo ship remained in the Formosa Strait into the early hours of the 30th, trying to ascertain the progress of the storm. When she had accurately plotted the typhoon's course — revealing her to be apparently out of danger — the ship resumed her voyage to her original destination.

Taking on board cargo at Buckner Bay, Warrick returned to Sasebo, making port on 3 November. She unloaded the cargo lifted from Okinawa and discharged the remnants of her fleet issue stores at Sasebo before she got underway on 16 November, bound, once more, for the west coast of the United States.

There was little rest for Warrick, however. No sooner had she reached home than she received orders to prepare for yet another Korean deployment. She accordingly loaded provisions, clothing and small stores; ship store items; general stores; and consigned cargo between 3 December and 23 December and embarked 135 Army and Air Force personnel for transportation to Sasebo. Departing San Francisco two days before Christmas 1950, Warrick reached Sasebo on 9 January 1951, mooring alongside stores ship Pollux (AKS-4) upon arrival.

Warrick remained at Sasebo, performing her duties as fleet issue ship, into mid-February. After taking on board approximately 800 tons of empty brass shell casings for shipment back to the United States, and unloading her dry provisions and clothing stores at Yokosuka from 16 February to 18 February, Warrick sailed for the United States on 19 February.

Over the next four years, Warrick's routine changed little. She operated in the western Pacific in regular deployments, carrying fleet freight, and touched at the familiar ports such as Sasebo and Yokosuka, as well as Hong Kong and Manila. In between, there were the usual stops at Pearl Harbor and San Francisco in the course of the ship's transpacific voyages.

After having spent her entire active career with the Pacific Fleet, Warrick commenced her last cruise to the Orient when she departed San Francisco on 28 January 1957. Her itinerary on the voyage included Yokosuka, Hong Kong, Sasebo, and Subic Bay, before she returned to San Francisco on 30 March.

=== Decommissioning and disposal ===
Warrick was placed in reserve at Astoria, Oregon, on 4 August 1957, and the workhorse cargo ship was decommissioned on 3 December 1957. Struck from the Navy List on 1 July 1961, Warrick was transferred to the Maritime Administration for lay-up at the reserve site at Olympia, Washington. Reacquired by the Navy on 20 April 1971 for use as a target ship, the ship was torpedoed and sunk by attack submarine Trigger (SS-564) 100 miles off Cape Flattery, Washington, in 1400 fathoms of water, on 28 May 1971.

== Awards ==
Warrick (AKA-89) received two battle stars for her World War II service and one for the Korean War.
