= USS LST-486 =

World War II US landing ship

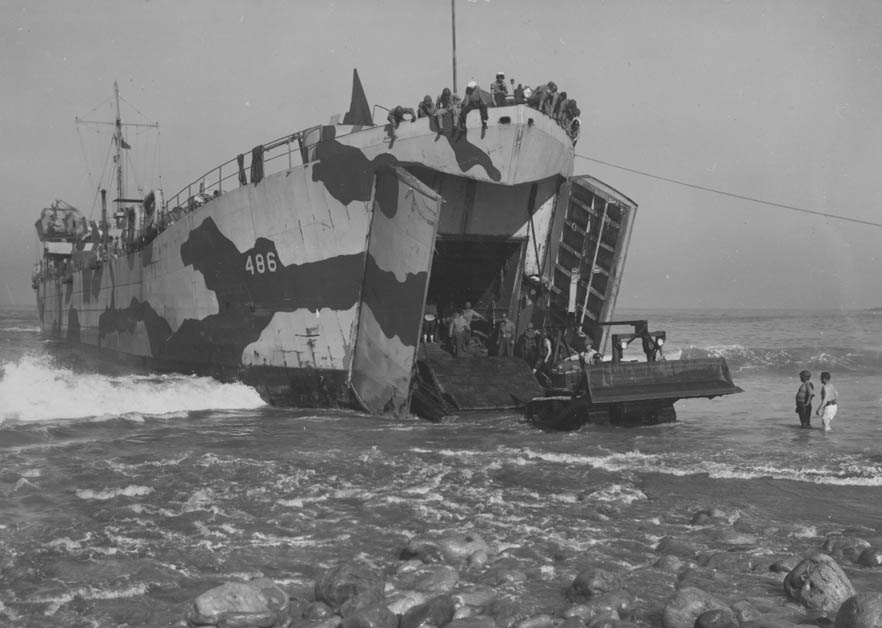
- USS LST-486 beached at San Clemente, California, while unloading a bulldozer during Acorn Training, 9 January 1944.

History

United States
- Name: LST-486
- Ordered: as a Type S3-M-K2 hull, MCE hull 1006
- Builder: Permanente Metals Corporation, Richmond, California
- Yard number: 41
- Laid down: 31 December 1942
- Launched: 16 January 1943
- Commissioned: 29 May 1943
- Decommissioned: 23 February 1946
- Reclassified: Landing Ship Tank (Hospital) LST(H)-486, 15 September 1945
- Identification: Hull symbol: LST-486; Hull symbol: LST(H)-486; Code letters: NGYF
- Honors and awards: 4 × battle stars
- Fate: assigned to Commander Naval Forces Far East

Japan
- Operator: Shipping Control Authority for Japan
- In service: 12 January 1946
- Out of service: unknown
- Renamed: Q011
- Stricken: 28 August 1947
- Fate: Destroyed, 23 July 1947

General characteristics
- Class & type: LST-1-class tank landing ship
- Displacement: 4,080 long tons (4,145 t) full load; 2,160 long tons (2,190 t) landing
- Length: 328 ft (100 m) oa
- Beam: 50 ft (15 m)
- Draft: Full load: 8 ft 2 in (2.49 m) forward; 14 ft 1 in (4.29 m) aft; Landing at 2,160 t: 3 ft 11 in (1.19 m) forward; 9 ft 10 in (3.00 m) aft
- Installed power: 2 × 900 hp (670 kW) Electro-Motive Diesel 12-567A diesel engines; 1,700 shp (1,300 kW)
- Propulsion: 1 × Falk main reduction gears; 2 × Propellers
- Speed: 12 kn (22 km/h; 14 mph)
- Range: 24,000 nmi (44,000 km; 28,000 mi) at 9 kn (17 km/h; 10 mph) while displacing 3,960 long tons (4,024 t)
- Boats & landing craft carried: 2 or 6 x LCVPs
- Capacity: 2,100 tons oceangoing maximum; 350 tons main deckload
- Troops: 16 officers, 147 enlisted men
- Complement: 13 officers, 104 enlisted men
- Armament: Varied, ultimate armament; 2 × twin 40 mm (1.57 in) Bofors guns; 4 × single 40 mm Bofors guns; 12 × 20 mm (0.79 in) Oerlikon cannons

Service record
- Part of: LST Flotilla 5; LST Flotilla 3
- Operations: Capture and occupation of Saipan (15 June–30 July 1944); Tinian Capture and occupation (24–30 July 1944); Leyte landings (20 October 1944); Lingayen Gulf landings (4–15 January 1945)
- Awards: American Campaign Medal; Asiatic–Pacific Campaign Medal; World War II Victory Medal; Navy Occupation Service Medal w/Asia Clasp; Philippine Republic Presidential Unit Citation; Philippine Liberation Medal

USS LST/LST(H)-486 was an LST-1-class tank landing ship built for the United States Navy during World War II.

== Construction ==
LST-486 was laid down on 31 December 1942, under Maritime Commission (MARCOM) contract, MC hull 1006, by Kaiser Shipyards, Yard No. 4, Richmond, California; launched on 16 January 1943; and commissioned on 29 May 1943.

== Service history ==
During World War II, LST-486 was assigned to the Asiatic-Pacific Theater and participated in the following operations: the Capture and occupation of Saipan in June and July 1944; the Capture and occupation of Tinian in July 1944; the Battle of Leyte landings October 1944; and the Lingayen Gulf landings January 1945.

== Post-war service ==
Following the war, LST-486 was redesignated LST(H)-486 on 15 September 1945. She performed occupation duty in the Far East in January 1946. Upon her return to the United States, she was decommissioned on 13 January 1946. The tank landing ship was operated by the Shipping Control Authority, Japan, until destroyed on 23 July 1947. Her name was struck from the Navy list on 28 August 1947.

== Awards ==
LST-486 earned four battle stars for World War II service.

== Notes ==
Citations

== Bibliography ==
Online resources

- "LST-486". Dictionary of American Naval Fighting Ships. Naval History and Heritage Command. This article incorporates text from this source, which is in the public domain.
- "Kaiser Permanente No. 4, Richmond CA". www.ShipbuildingHistory.com. 5 February 2014.
- "USS LST-486". NavSource. 28 November 2014.
