= USS LST-488 =

LST-1-class tank landing ship

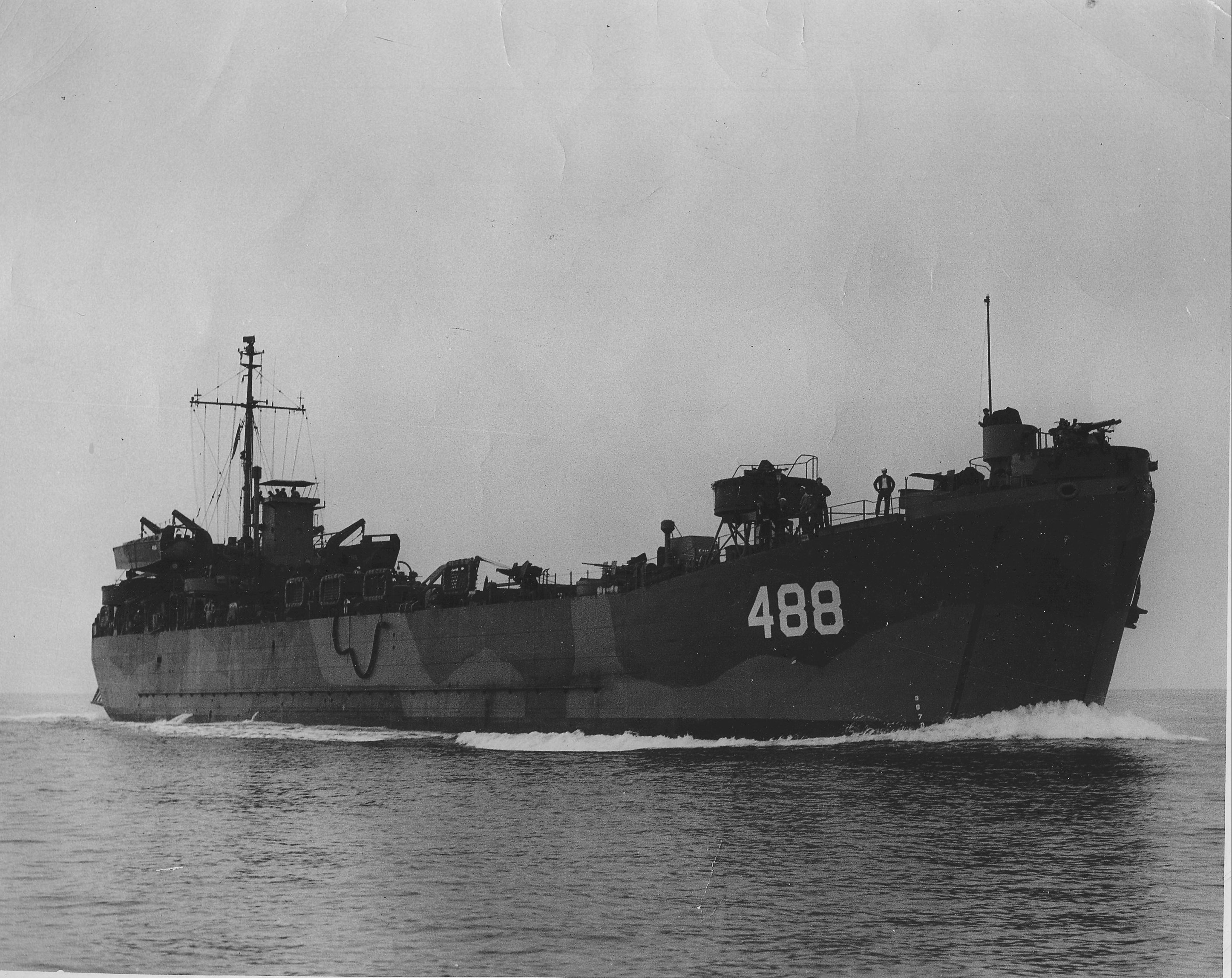
- USS LST-488, underway, date and location unknown.

History

United States
- Name: LST-488
- Ordered: as a Type S3-M-K2 hull, MCE hull 1008
- Builder: Permanente Metals Corporation, Richmond, California
- Yard number: 4183
- Laid down: 11 January 1943
- Launched: 5 March 1943
- Commissioned: 24 May 1943
- Decommissioned: 11 January 1946
- Reclassified: Landing Ship Tank (Hospital) LST(H)-488, 15 September 1945
- Identification: Hull symbol: LST-488; Hull symbol: LST(H)-488; Code letters: NHAS
- Honors and awards: 4 × battle stars
- Fate: assigned to Commander Naval Forces Far East

Japan
- Operator: Shipping Control Authority for Japan
- In service: 11 January 1946
- Out of service: unknown
- Renamed: Q009
- Fate: Transferred to the Military Sea Transportation Service (MSTS), 12 March 1952

United States
- Operator: MSTS
- In service: 12 March 1952
- Out of service: 15 July 1972
- Identification: Hull symbol: T-LST-488
- Fate: Transferred to the Philippine Navy, 15 July 1972

PhilippinesPhilippines
- Name: Surigao del Norte
- Namesake: The Province of Surigao del Norte
- In service: 15 July 1972
- Identification: Hull symbol: LT-97
- Fate: unknown

General characteristics
- Class & type: LST-1-class tank landing ship
- Displacement: 4,080 long tons (4,145 t) full load; 2,160 long tons (2,190 t) landing
- Length: 328 ft (100 m) oa
- Beam: 50 ft (15 m)
- Draft: Full load: 8 ft 2 in (2.49 m) forward; 14 ft 1 in (4.29 m) aft; Landing at 2,160 t: 3 ft 11 in (1.19 m) forward; 9 ft 10 in (3.00 m) aft
- Installed power: 2 × 900 hp (670 kW) Electro-Motive Diesel 12-567A diesel engines; 1,700 shp (1,300 kW)
- Propulsion: 1 × Falk main reduction gears; 2 × Propellers
- Speed: 12 kn (22 km/h; 14 mph)
- Range: 24,000 nmi (44,000 km; 28,000 mi) at 9 kn (17 km/h; 10 mph) while displacing 3,960 long tons (4,024 t)
- Boats & landing craft carried: 2 or 6 x LCVPs
- Capacity: 2,100 tons oceangoing maximum; 350 tons main deckload
- Troops: 16 officers, 147 enlisted men
- Complement: 13 officers, 104 enlisted men
- Armament: Varied, ultimate armament; 2 × twin 40 mm (1.57 in) Bofors guns; 4 × single 40 mm Bofors guns; 12 × 20 mm (0.79 in) Oerlikon cannons

Service record
- Part of: LST Flotilla 5; LST Flotilla 3
- Operations: Occupation and defense of Cape Torokina (6–17 November 1943); Capture and occupation of Guam (21–28 July 1944); Leyte landings (20 October 1944); Lingayen Gulf landings (4–15 January 1945)
- Awards: Navy Unit Commendation; American Campaign Medal; Asiatic–Pacific Campaign Medal; World War II Victory Medal; Navy Occupation Service Medal w/Asia Clasp; Philippine Republic Presidential Unit Citation; Philippine Liberation Medal

USS LST/LST(H)/T-LST-488 was an LST-1-class tank landing ship built for the United States Navy during World War II.

== Construction ==
LST-488 was laid down on 11 January 1943, under Maritime Commission (MARCOM) contract, MC hull 1008, by Kaiser Shipyards, Yard No. 4, Richmond, California; launched on 5 March 1943; and commissioned on 24 May 1943.

== Service history ==
During World War II, LST-488 was assigned to the Asiatic-Pacific Theater and participated in the following operations: the Occupation and defense of Cape Torokina in November 1943; the Capture and occupation of Guam in July 1944; the Battle of Leyte landings October 1944; and the Lingayen Gulf landings January 1945.

== Post-war service ==
Following the war, LST-488 was redesignated LST(H)-488 on 15 September 1945, and performed occupation duty in the Far East until 11 January 1946. Upon her return to the United States, she was decommissioned on 11 January 1946. She was redesignated LST-488 on 6 March 1952, and served with the Military Sea Transportation Service as USNS LST-488 in the postwar period. The ship was transferred to the Republic of the Philippines as a lease on 15 July 1972.

== Awards ==
LST-488 earned four battle stars for World War II service.

== Notes ==
Citations

== Bibliography ==
Online resources

- "LST-488". Dictionary of American Naval Fighting Ships. Naval History and Heritage Command. This article incorporates text from this source, which is in the public domain.
- "Kaiser Permanente No. 4, Richmond CA". www.ShipbuildingHistory.com. 5 February 2014.
- "USS LST-488". NavSource. 28 November 2014.
