= USS LST-40 =

United States Navy LST-1-class tank landing ship

History

United States
- Name: LST-40
- Builder: Dravo Corporation, Pittsburgh, Pennsylvania
- Laid down: 3 June 1943
- Launched: 7 August 1943
- Commissioned: 15 September 1943
- Decommissioned: 18 February 1946
- Stricken: 5 March 1947
- Identification: Hull symbol: LST-40; Code letters: NHBF
- Honors and awards: 4 × battle stars
- Status: Assigned to Commander Naval Forces Far East

Japan
- Name: Q066
- Operator: Shipping Control Authority for Japan
- Fate: Sold to the Korea, February 1947
- Status: Unknown

General characteristics
- Type: LST-1-class tank landing ship
- Displacement: 4,080 long tons (4,145 t) full load; 2,160 long tons (2,190 t) landing
- Length: 328 ft (100 m) oa
- Beam: 50 ft (15 m)
- Draft: Full load: 8 ft 2 in (2.49 m) forward; 14 ft 1 in (4.29 m) aft; Landing at 2,160 t: 3 ft 11 in (1.19 m) forward; 9 ft 10 in (3.00 m) aft
- Installed power: 2 × 900 hp (670 kW) Electro-Motive Diesel 12-567A diesel engines; 1,700 shp (1,300 kW)
- Propulsion: 1 × Falk main reduction gears; 2 × Propellers
- Speed: 12 kn (22 km/h; 14 mph)
- Range: 24,000 nmi (44,000 km; 28,000 mi) at 9 kn (17 km/h; 10 mph) while displacing 3,960 long tons (4,024 t)
- Boats & landing craft carried: 2 or 6 x LCVPs
- Capacity: 2,100 tons oceangoing maximum; 350 tons main deckload
- Troops: 16 officers, 147 enlisted men
- Complement: 13 officers, 104 enlisted men
- Armament: Varied, ultimate armament; 2 × twin 40 mm (1.57 in) Bofors guns; 4 × single 40 mm Bofors guns; 12 × 20 mm (0.79 in) Oerlikon cannons

Service record
- Part of: LST Flotilla 5
- Awards: American Campaign Medal; Asiatic–Pacific Campaign Medal; World War II Victory Medal; Navy Occupation Service Medal w/Asia Clasp

USS LST-40 was a United States Navy LST-1-class tank landing ship used exclusively in the Asiatic-Pacific Theater during World War II. Like many of her class, she was not named and is properly referred to by her hull designation.

== Construction ==
LST-40 was laid down on 3 June 1943, at Pittsburgh, Pennsylvania, by the Dravo Corporation; launched on 7 August 1943; sponsored by Miss Hilda Sambolt; and commissioned on 15 September 1943.

== Service history ==
During World War II, LST-40 was assigned to the Asiatic-Pacific theater.

Following the war, LST-40 performed occupation duty in the Far East until mid-February 1946. She returned to the United States and was decommissioned on 18 February 1946. In February 1947, she was transferred to the United States Army Military Government in Korea, as a sale, and was struck from the Navy list on 5 March, that same year.

== Awards ==
LST-40 earned four battle stars for World War II service.

== See also ==
- List of United States Navy ships
- Landing craft
- List of United States Navy LSTs

== Bibliography ==
- "LST-40". Dictionary of American Naval Fighting Ships. Naval History and Heritage Command. This article incorporates text from this source, which is in the public domain.
- "USS LST-40". NavSource. 10 March 2017.
