= USS LST-477 =

US Navy tank landing ship

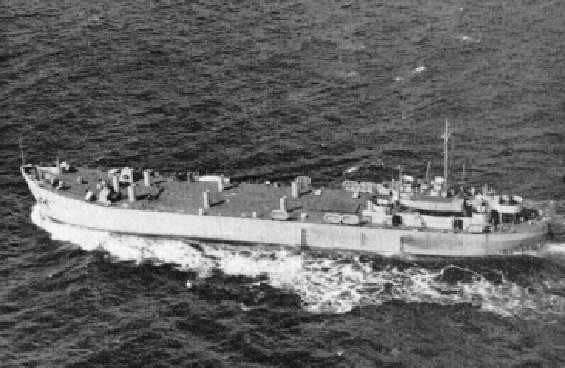
- USS LST-477, underway, 30 March 1943, location unknown.

History

United States
- Name: LST-477
- Ordered: as a Type S3-M-K2 hull, MCE hull 997
- Builder: Permanente Metals Corporation, Yard No. 4, Richmond, California
- Cost: $1,711,380.19
- Yard number: 32
- Way number: 2
- Laid down: 12 August 1942
- Launched: 29 October 1942
- Sponsored by: Mrs. Mary K. McNeil
- Commissioned: 19 February 1943
- Decommissioned: 25 April 1946
- Reclassified: Landing Ship Tank (Hospital) LST(H)-477, 15 September 1945
- Identification: Hull symbol: LST-477; Hull symbol: LST(H)-477; Code letters:NGLY
- Honors and awards: 4 × battle stars
- Fate: assigned to Commander Naval Forces Far East

Japan
- Operator: Shipping Control Authority for Japan
- In service: 25 April 1946
- Out of service: date unknown
- Renamed: Q091
- Fate: returned to USN

United States
- Stricken: 28 August 1947
- Fate: Sold for scrapping, 27 March 1948

General characteristics
- Class & type: LST-1-class tank landing ship
- Displacement: 4,080 long tons (4,145 t) full load; 2,160 long tons (2,190 t) landing
- Length: 328 ft (100 m) oa
- Beam: 50 ft (15 m)
- Draft: Full load: 8 ft 2 in (2.49 m) forward; 14 ft 1 in (4.29 m) aft; Landing at 2,160 t: 3 ft 11 in (1.19 m) forward; 9 ft 10 in (3.00 m) aft
- Installed power: 2 × 900 hp (670 kW) Electro-Motive Diesel 12-567A diesel engines; 1,700 shp (1,300 kW)
- Propulsion: 1 × Falk main reduction gears; 2 × Propellers
- Speed: 12 kn (22 km/h; 14 mph)
- Range: 24,000 nmi (44,000 km; 28,000 mi) at 9 kn (17 km/h; 10 mph) while displacing 3,960 long tons (4,024 t)
- Boats & landing craft carried: 2 or 6 x LCVPs
- Capacity: 2,100 tons oceangoing maximum; 350 tons main deckload
- Troops: 16 officers, 147 enlisted men
- Complement: 13 officers, 104 enlisted men
- Armament: Varied, ultimate armament; 2 × twin 40 mm (1.57 in) Bofors guns; 4 × single 40 mm Bofors guns; 12 × 20 mm (0.79 in) Oerlikon cannons

Service record
- Part of: LST Flotilla 5
- Operations: Gilbert Islands operations (21 November–8 December 1943); Occupation of Kwajalein and Majuro Atolls (2–8 February 1944); Capture and occupation of Guam (21–29 July 1944); Assault and occupation of Iwo Jima (20–28 February 1945)
- Awards: Combat Action Ribbon; Navy Unit Commendation; American Campaign Medal; Asiatic–Pacific Campaign Medal; World War II Victory Medal; Navy Occupation Service Medal w/Asia Clasp

USS LST-477/LST(H)-477 was a United States Navy LST-1-class tank landing ship used in the Asiatic-Pacific Theater during World War II.

== Construction ==
LST-477 was laid down on 12 August 1942, under Maritime Commission (MARCOM) contract, MC hull 997, by Kaiser Shipyards, Yard No. 4, Richmond, California; launched on 29 October 1942, sponsored by Mrs. Mary K. McNeil; and commissioned on 19 February 1943.

== Service history ==
During the war, LST-477 was assigned to the Asiatic-Pacific Theater. She took part in the Gilbert Islands operation November and December 1943; the Occupation of Kwajalein and Majuro Atolls in February 1944; the Battle of Guam in July 1944; and the Battle of Iwo Jima in February 1945.

== Post-war service ==
Following the war, LST-477 was redesignated LST(H)-477 on 15 September 1945. She performed occupation duty in the Far East until mid-February 1946. Upon her return to the United States and struck from the Navy list on 28 August 1947. On 27 March 1948, the ship was sold to the Consolidated Builders, Inc., Seattle, Washington, and subsequently scrapped.

== Honors and awards ==
LST-477 earned four battle stars and the Navy Unit Commendation for her World War II service.

== Notes ==
Citations

== Bibliography ==
Online resources

- "LST-477". Dictionary of American Naval Fighting Ships. Naval History and Heritage Command. This article incorporates text from this source, which is in the public domain.
- "Kaiser Permanente No. 4, Richmond CA". www.ShipbuildingHistory.com. 5 February 2014.
- "USS LST-477". NavSource. 22 January 2016.
- "MC-997".
