= USS LST-482 =

WWII US naval vessel

History

United States
- Name: LST-482
- Ordered: as a Type S3-M-K2 hull, MCE hull 1002
- Builder: Permanente Metals Corporation, Richmond, California
- Yard number: 37
- Laid down: 14 September 1942
- Launched: 17 December 1942
- Commissioned: 20 March 1943
- Decommissioned: 23 February 1946
- Reclassified: Landing Ship Tank (Hospital) LST(H)-482, 15 September 1945
- Identification: Hull symbol: LST-482; Hull symbol: LST(H)-482; Code letters: NGTL
- Honors and awards: 6 × battle stars
- Fate: assigned to Commander Naval Forces Far East

Japan
- Operator: Shipping Control Authority for Japan
- In service: 23 February 1946
- Out of service: unknown
- Renamed: Q072
- Fate: returned to USN

United States
- Name: Q072
- Renamed: LST-482, 11 March 1952; Branch County, 1 July 1955
- Namesake: Branch County, Michigan
- Stricken: 11 August 1955
- Fate: Sunk as target, March 1956

General characteristics
- Class & type: LST-1-class tank landing ship
- Displacement: 4,080 long tons (4,145 t) full load; 2,160 long tons (2,190 t) landing
- Length: 328 ft (100 m) oa
- Beam: 50 ft (15 m)
- Draft: Full load: 8 ft 2 in (2.49 m) forward; 14 ft 1 in (4.29 m) aft; Landing at 2,160 t: 3 ft 11 in (1.19 m) forward; 9 ft 10 in (3.00 m) aft
- Installed power: 2 × 900 hp (670 kW) Electro-Motive Diesel 12-567A diesel engines; 1,700 shp (1,300 kW)
- Propulsion: 1 × Falk main reduction gears; 2 × Propellers
- Speed: 12 kn (22 km/h; 14 mph)
- Range: 24,000 nmi (44,000 km; 28,000 mi) at 9 kn (17 km/h; 10 mph) while displacing 3,960 long tons (4,024 t)
- Boats & landing craft carried: 2 or 6 x LCVPs
- Capacity: 2,100 tons oceangoing maximum; 350 tons main deckload
- Troops: 16 officers, 147 enlisted men
- Complement: 13 officers, 104 enlisted men
- Armament: Varied, ultimate armament; 2 × twin 40 mm (1.57 in) Bofors guns; 4 × single 40 mm Bofors guns; 12 × 20 mm (0.79 in) Oerlikon cannons

Service record
- Part of: LST Flotilla 3
- Operations: Gilbert Islands operation (12 November–8 December 1943); Occupation of Kwajalein and Majuro Atolls (31 January–8 February 1944); Battle of Hollandia (21–26 April 1944); Capture and occupation of Guam (21–28 July 1944); Leyte landings (20 October 1944); Lingayen Gulf landings (4–15 January 1945)
- Awards: American Campaign Medal; Asiatic–Pacific Campaign Medal; World War II Victory Medal; Navy Occupation Service Medal w/Asia Clasp; Philippine Liberation Medal

USS LST/LST(H)-482/Branch County (LST-482) was an LST-1-class tank landing ship built for the United States Navy during World War II. Later renamed for Branch County, Michigan, she was the only US Naval vessel to bear the name.

== Construction ==
LST-482 was laid down on 14 September 1942, under Maritime Commission (MARCOM) contract, MC hull 1002, by Kaiser Shipyards, Yard No. 4, Richmond, California; launched on 17 December 1942; and commissioned on 20 March 1943.

== Service history ==
During World War II, LST-482 was assigned to the Asiatic-Pacific Theater and participated in the following operations: the Gilbert Islands operation in November and December 1943; the Occupation of Kwajalein and Majuro Atolls in January and February 1944; the Battle of Hollandia April 1944; the Battle of Guam July 1944; the Battle of Leyte landings October 1944; and the Lingayen Gulf landings January 1945.

== Post-war service ==
Following the war, LST-482 was redesignated LST(H)-482 on 15 September 1945. She performed occupation duty in the Far East in November and December 1945. Upon her return to the United States, she was decommissioned on 23 February 1946 and redesignated LST-482 on 6 March 1952. The tank landing ship was subsequently renamed USS Branch County (LST-482) on 1 July 1955. Her name was struck from the Naval Vessel Register on 11 August 1955. In early March, 1956 the ship was sunk by naval gunfire and submarine-launched torpedoes in an exercise off San Diego, California.

== Awards ==
LST-482 earned six battle stars for World War II service.

== Notes ==
Citations

== Bibliography ==
Online resources

- "LST-482". Dictionary of American Naval Fighting Ships. Naval History and Heritage Command. This article incorporates text from this source, which is in the public domain.
- "Kaiser Permanente No. 4, Richmond CA". ShipbuildingHistory.com. 5 February 2014.
- "USS LST-482". NavSource. 31 October 2014.
