= USS LST-701 =

1944 LST-542-class tank landing ship

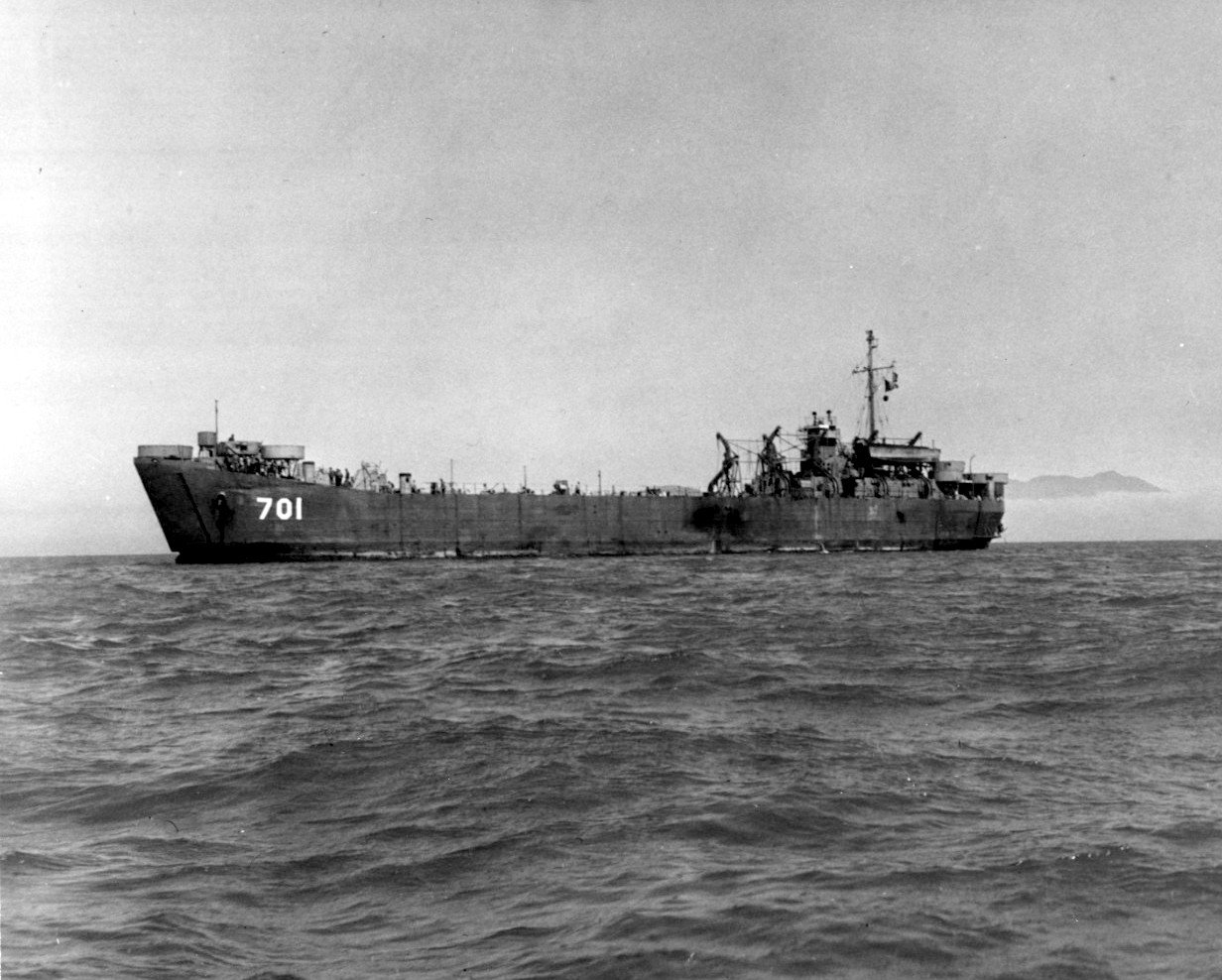
- USS LST-701 at anchor in San Francisco Bay, circa 1945

History

United States
- Name: USS LST-701
- Builder: Jeffersonville Boat & Machine Company, Jeffersonville, Indiana
- Laid down: 1 April 1944
- Launched: 18 May 1944
- Commissioned: 13 June 1944
- Decommissioned: 13 July 1946
- Stricken: 28 August 1946
- Honours and awards: 3 battle stars (World War II)
- Fate: Sold for scrapping, 27 October 1947

General characteristics
- Class & type: LST-542-class tank landing ship
- Displacement: 1,625 long tons (1,651 t) light; 3,640 long tons (3,698 t) full
- Length: 328 ft (100 m)
- Beam: 50 ft (15 m)
- Draft: Unloaded : 2 ft 4 in (0.71 m) forward; 7 ft 6 in (2.29 m) aft; Loaded : 8 ft 2 in (2.49 m) forward; 14 ft 1 in (4.29 m) aft
- Propulsion: 2 × General Motors 12-567 diesel engines, two shafts, twin rudders
- Speed: 12 knots (22 km/h; 14 mph)
- Boats & landing craft carried: 2 LCVPs
- Troops: Approximately 130 officers and enlisted men
- Complement: 8-10 officers, 89-100 enlisted men
- Armament: 1 × single 3"/50 caliber gun mount; 8 × 40 mm guns; 12 × 20 mm guns

USS LST-701 was an LST-542-class tank landing ship built for the United States Navy in World War II. Like many of her class, she was not named and is properly referred to by her hull designation.

LST-701 was laid down on 1 April 1944 at Jeffersonville, Indiana, by the Jeffersonville Boat & Machine Co.; launched on 18 May 1944; and commissioned on 13 June 1944.

== Service history ==
During World War II LST-701 was assigned to the Asiatic-Pacific theater and participated in the Lingayen Gulf landing, January 1945, the Nasugbu operation, January 1945, and the assault and occupation of Okinawa Gunto in April through June 1945.

LST-701 was decommissioned on 13 July 1946, and struck from the Navy Vessel Register on 28 August 1946. She was sold for scrapping on 27 October 1947 to Moore Dry Dock Company, Oakland, California.

LST-701 earned three battle stars for World War II service.

== See also ==
- List of United States Navy LSTs
- LSTH
