= USS LST-952 =

Ship in the US Navy

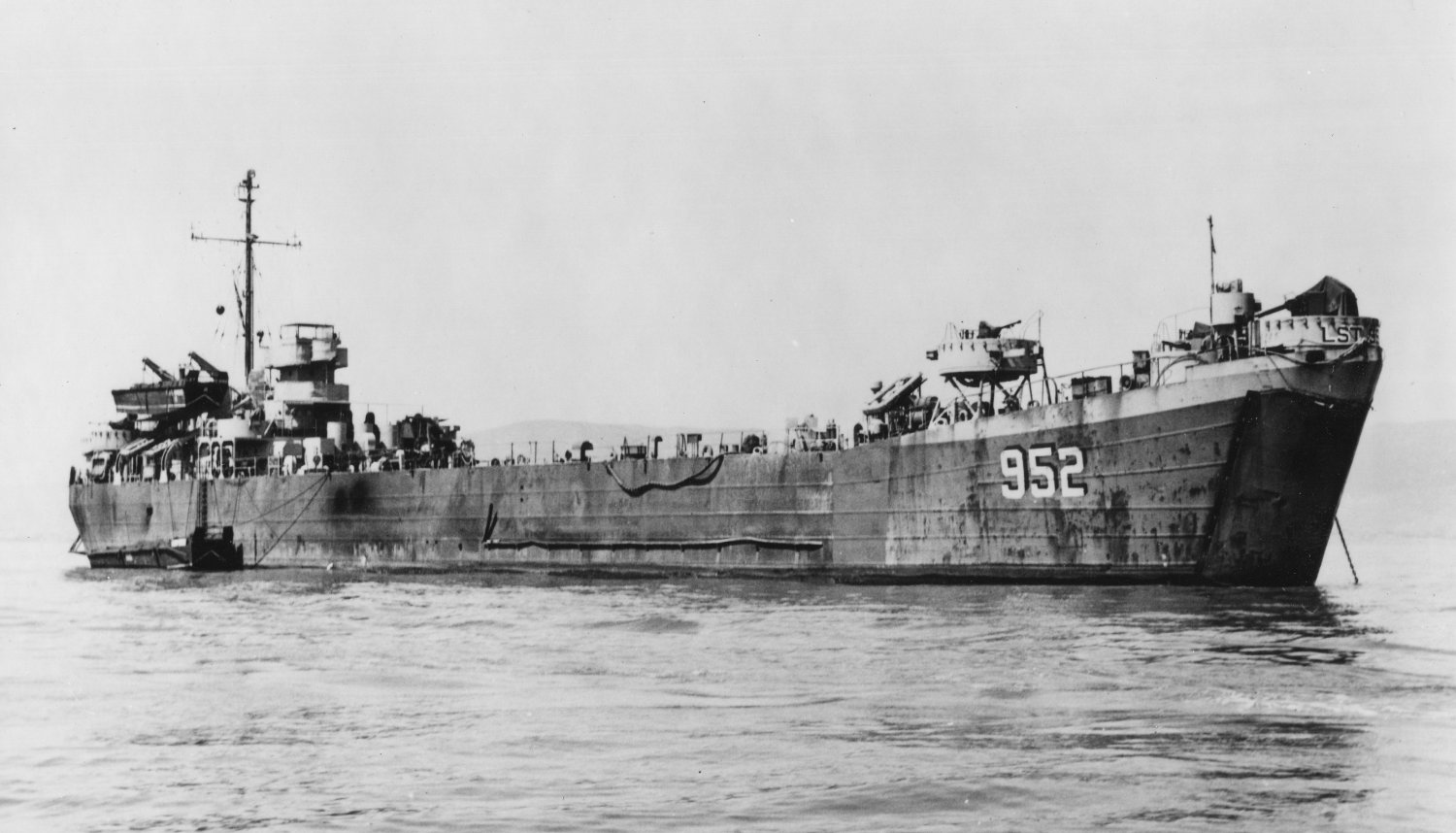
- USS LST-952 at anchor in San Francisco Bay, c. 1946.

History

United States
- Name: LST-952
- Builder: Bethlehem-Hingham Shipyard, Hingham, Massachusetts
- Yard number: 3422
- Laid down: 1 September 1944
- Launched: 11 October 1944
- Commissioned: 3 November 1944
- Decommissioned: 1 August 1946
- Reclassified: Landing Ship Tank (Hospital), 15 September 1945
- Stricken: 22 January 1947
- Identification: Hull symbol: LST-952; Hull symbol: LST(H)-952; Code letters: NKEW
- Honors and awards: 1 × battle star
- Fate: Sold for scrapping, 10 October 1947

General characteristics
- Class & type: LST-542-class tank landing ship
- Displacement: 1,625 long tons (1,651 t) (light); 4,080 long tons (4,145 t) (full (seagoing draft with 1,675 short tons (1,520 t) load); 2,366 long tons (2,404 t) (beaching)
- Length: 328 ft (100 m) oa
- Beam: 50 ft (15 m)
- Draft: Unloaded: 2 ft 4 in (0.71 m) forward; 7 ft 6 in (2.29 m) aft; Full load: 8 ft 3 in (2.51 m) forward; 14 ft 1 in (4.29 m) aft; Landing with 500 short tons (450 t) load: 3 ft 11 in (1.19 m) forward; 9 ft 10 in (3.00 m) aft; Limiting 11 ft 2 in (3.40 m); Maximum navigation 14 ft 1 in (4.29 m)
- Installed power: 2 × 900 hp (670 kW) Electro-Motive Diesel 12-567A diesel engines; 1,800 shp (1,300 kW)
- Propulsion: 1 × Falk main reduction gears; 2 × Propellers
- Speed: 11.6 kn (21.5 km/h; 13.3 mph)
- Range: 24,000 nmi (44,000 km; 28,000 mi) at 9 kn (17 km/h; 10 mph) while displacing 3,960 long tons (4,024 t)
- Boats & landing craft carried: 2 x LCVPs
- Capacity: 1,600–1,900 short tons (3,200,000–3,800,000 lb; 1,500,000–1,700,000 kg) cargo depending on mission
- Troops: 16 officers, 147 enlisted men
- Complement: 13 officers, 104 enlisted men
- Armament: Varied, ultimate armament; 2 × twin 40 mm (1.57 in) Bofors guns; 4 × single 40 mm Bofors guns; 12 × 20 mm (0.79 in) Oerlikon cannons

Service record
- Part of: LST Flotilla 21
- Operations: Assault and occupation of Okinawa Gunto (1 April–28 June 1945)
- Awards: China Service Medal; American Campaign Medal; Asiatic–Pacific Campaign Medal; World War II Victory Medal; Navy Occupation Service Medal w/Asia Clasp

USS LST-952/LST(H)-952 was an LST-542-class tank landing ship in the United States Navy. Like many of her class, she was not named and is properly referred to by her hull designation.

== Construction ==
LST-952 was laid down on 1 September 1944, at Hingham, Massachusetts, by the Bethlehem-Hingham Shipyard; launched on 11 October 1944; and commissioned on 3 November 1944.

== Service history ==
During World War II, LST-952 was assigned to the Asiatic-Pacific theater and participated in the assault and occupation of Okinawa Gunto from April through June 1945.

On 15 September 1945, she was redesignated LST(H)-952 and performed occupation duty in the Far East and saw service in China until early May 1946. She returned to the United States and was decommissioned on 1 August 1946, and struck from the Navy list on 22 January 1947. On 10 October 1947, the ship was sold to Luria Bros. & Co., Inc., of Philadelphia, Pennsylvania, for scrapping.

== Awards ==
LST-952 earned one battle star for World War II service.

== Bibliography ==
Online resources

- "LST-952". Dictionary of American Naval Fighting Ships. Naval History and Heritage Command. This article incorporates text from this source, which is in the public domain.
- "Bethlehem-Hingham, Hingham MA". www.ShipbuildingHistory.com. 11 August 2011.
- "USS LST-952". NavSource. 27 May 2016.
