= USS LST-247 =

Tank landing ship

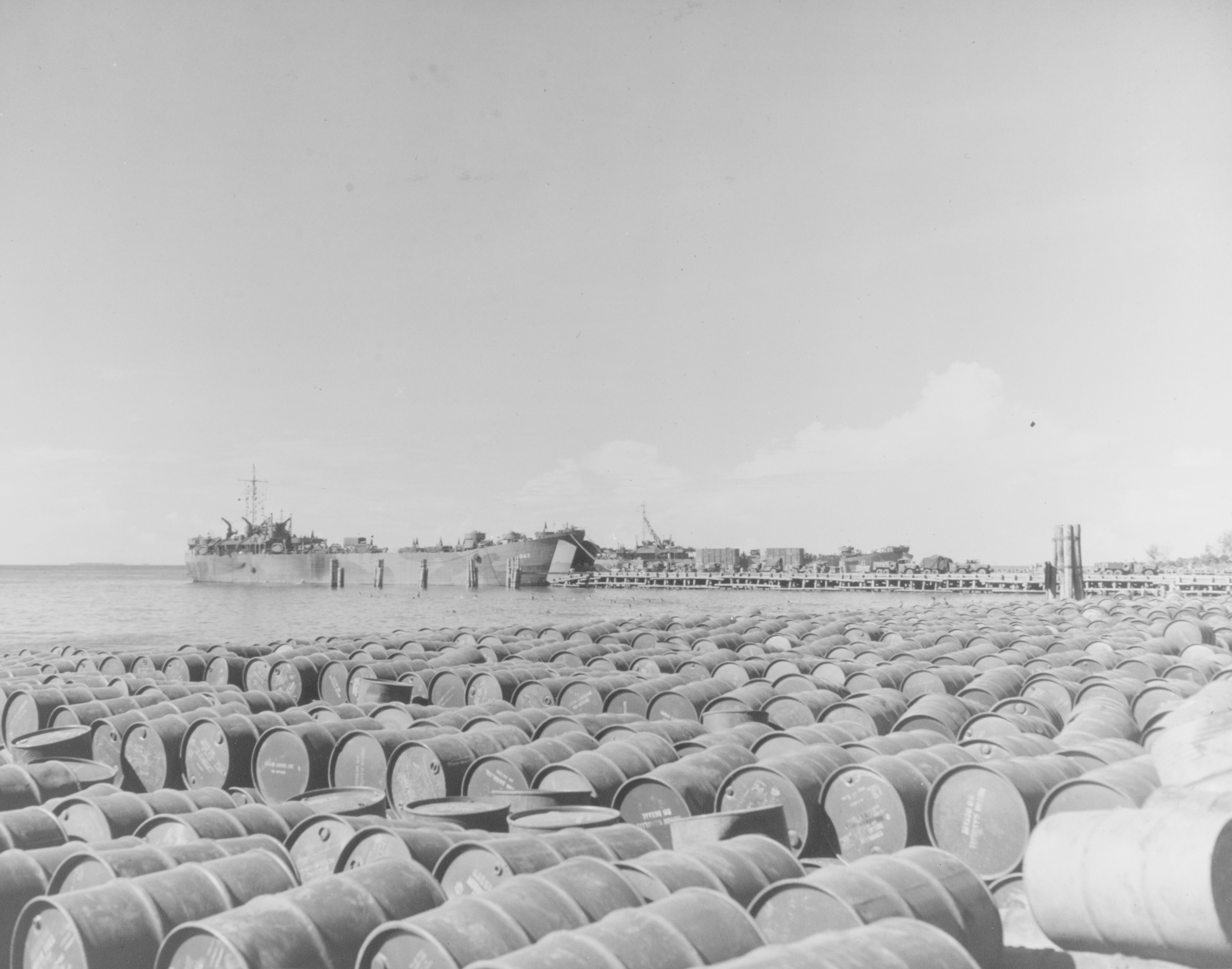
- USS LST-247 in Guam on 18 May 1944

History

United States
- Name: LST-247
- Builder: Missouri Valley Bridge & Iron Co., Evansville
- Laid down: 12 May 1943
- Launched: 30 July 1943
- Commissioned: 26 August 1943
- Decommissioned: 2 July 1946
- Stricken: 15 August 1946
- Fate: Scrapped, 1947

General characteristics
- Class & type: LST-1-class tank landing ship
- Length: 328 ft
- Beam: 50 ft
- Draft: light: 2' 4" fwd, 7' 6" aft, sea-going: 8' 3" fwd, 14' 1" aft, landing: 3' 11" fwd, 9' 10" aft (landing with 500 ton load)
- Propulsion: Two General Motors 12-567, 900hp diesel engines, two shafts, twin rudders
- Speed: 12 knots (22 km/h)
- Range: 24,000 miles
- Boats & landing craft carried: 2 LCVPs
- Complement: 7 officers, 104 enlisted
- Armament: (2) twin 40 mm gun mounts w/Mk. 51 directors, (4) single 40 mm gun mounts, (12) single 20 mm gun mounts

USS LST-247 was a tank landing ship in the United States Navy. Like many of her class, she was not named and is properly referred to by her hull designation.

== History ==
LST-247 was laid down on 12 May 1943 in Evansville, IN.

During World War II, LST-247 was assigned to the Pacific theater and participated in the following operations:

- Bougainville – February 1944
- Invasion of Hollandia – April 1944
- Invasion of Guam – July 1944
- Invasion of Iwo Jima – February 1945

LST-247 beached at Kukum Beach, on the US-held island of Guadalcanal on 21 January 1944 accompanied by LSTs 399 and 200. She delivered over 500 tons of deck cargo, 170 tons of rolling cargo, 14 officers, and 235 enlisted men from the 106th Reconnaissance Squadron. Immediately following this, LST-247 then headed for Bougainville, where she delivered additional troops and equipment. In February the crew shot down a Japanese Betty Bomber.

In late March, the crew received orders to sail for Milne Bay, New Guinea, where they began preparations for the Hollandia invasion at Aitape. The ship beached at Aitape at sunrise on 23 April but damaged her anchor winch. She managed to retract from the beach by sunset.

LST-247 set sail for Saipan in June 1944, where there were run-ins with the Japanese. The task group came under attack by torpedo planes on two separate occasions, and during one incident, shot down friendly aircraft when it approached unexpectedly.

The ship's task during the Guam invasion was in picking up casualties and bringing them to Pearl Harbor, where she arrived in August 1944. She underwent maintenance and resumed sail in January 1945, where she participated in the February amphibious assault on the Japanese stronghold island of Iwo Jima. She retracted from Iwo Jima after spending nearly a month on the beach.

By April 1945, LST-247 was back at Pearl Harbor. She set sail for Seattle to undergo extensive repairs. In August, she arrived at Pearl Harbor, where she was redesignated as a Landing Ship Tank (Hospital) LST(H)-247 on 15 September 1945. She was decommissioned nearly a year after this, and was sold for scrap to William H. Skinner in 1947.

LST-247 was awarded one battle star for World War II service.

== Sources ==
- "NavSource Online: LST / LST(H)-247". NavSource.
