= USS LST-399 =

Tank landing ship of the US Navy

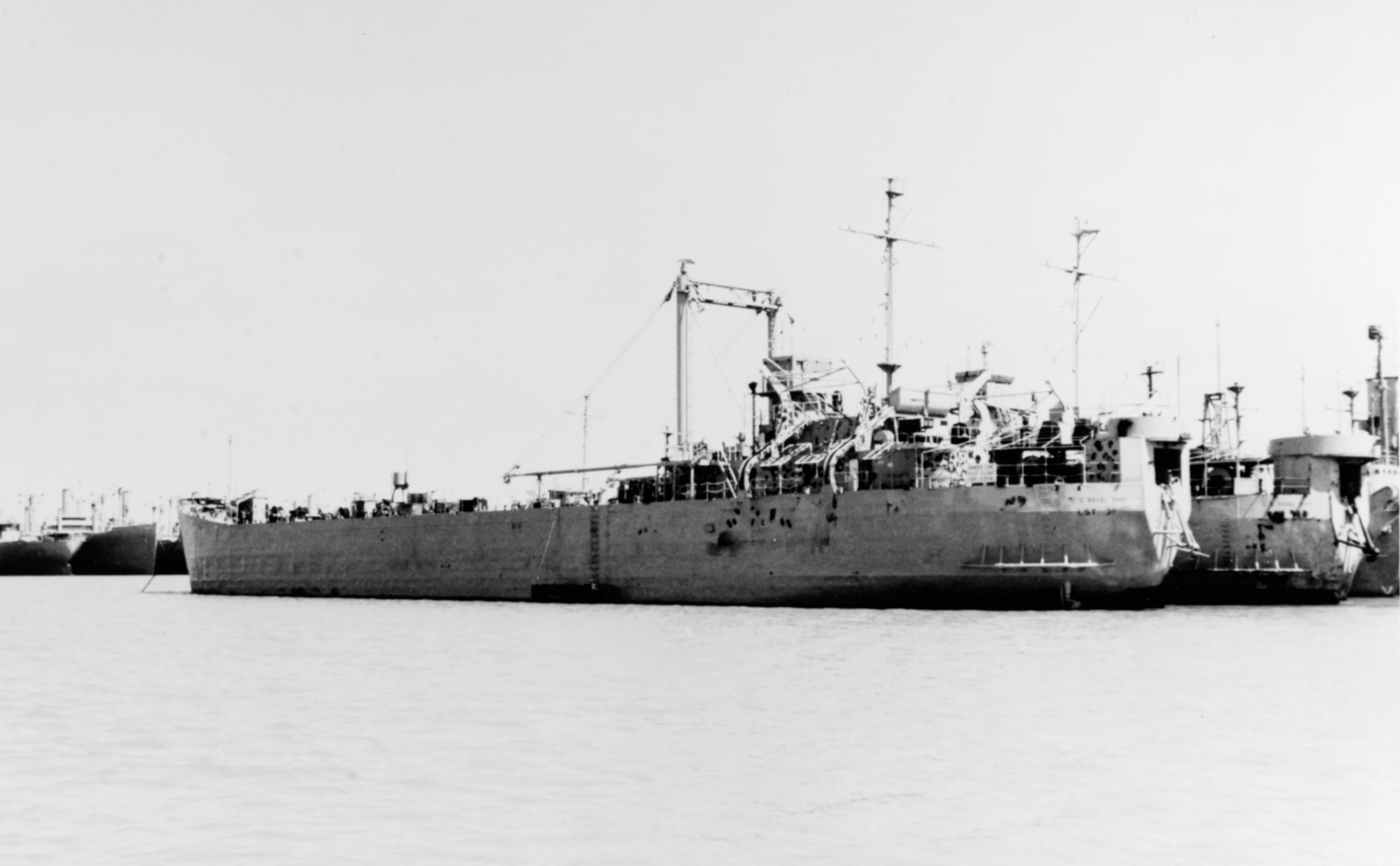
- T-LST-399 on 11 April 1974

History

United States
- Name: LST-399
- Owner: United States Navy (1943-1945); SCAJAP (1945-1952); MSTS (1952-1985)
- Builder: Newport News Shipbuilding and Drydock Co., Newport News
- Laid down: 28 September 1942
- Launched: 23 November 1942
- Commissioned: 4 January 1943
- Decommissioned: 8 December 1945
- Renamed: Q088, 1945; T-LST-399, 1952; IX-511
- Stricken: 1 November 1973
- Honours and awards: See Awards
- Fate: Scrapped

General characteristics
- Type: LST-1-class tank landing ship
- Displacement: 4,080 long tons (4,145 t) full load; 2,160 long tons (2,190 t) landing
- Length: 328 ft (100 m) oa
- Beam: 50 ft (15 m)
- Draft: Full load: 8 ft 2 in (2.49 m) forward; 14 ft 1 in (4.29 m) aft; Landing at 2,160 t: 3 ft 11 in (1.19 m) forward; 9 ft 10 in (3.00 m) aft
- Installed power: 2 × 900 hp (670 kW) Electro-Motive Diesel 12-567A diesel engines; 1,700 shp (1,300 kW)
- Propulsion: 1 × Falk main reduction gears; 2 × Propellers
- Speed: 12 kn (22 km/h; 14 mph)
- Range: 24,000 nmi (44,000 km; 28,000 mi) at 9 kn (17 km/h; 10 mph) while displacing 3,960 long tons (4,024 t)
- Boats & landing craft carried: 2 or 6 x LCVPs
- Capacity: 2,100 tons oceangoing maximum; 350 tons main deckload
- Troops: 16 officers, 147 enlisted men
- Complement: 13 officers, 104 enlisted men
- Armament: Varied, ultimate armament; 2 × twin 40 mm (1.57 in) Bofors guns; 4 × single 40 mm Bofors guns; 12 × 20 mm (0.79 in) Oerlikon cannons

USS LST-399 was an LST-1-class tank landing ship in the United States Navy during World War II.

== Construction and commissioning ==
LST-399 was laid down on 28 September 1942 at Newport News Shipbuilding and Drydock Co., Newport News, Virginia. Launched on 23 November 1942 and commissioned on 4 January 1943.

During World War II, LST-399 was assigned to the Asiatic-Pacific theater and participated in the occupation of New Georgia-Rendova-Vangunu on 21 July and Vella Lavella from 15 and 26 August 1943. Assault on the Treasury Island from 27 October and 6 November 1943.

The capture and occupation of Guam from 21 to 28 July 1944.

The ship participated in the assault and occupation of Iwo Jima from 19 to 25 February 1945 and later the assault and occupation of Okinawa from 1 to 14 April 1945. After the end of the war, the ship was decommissioned on 8 December 1945 and Commander Naval Forces Far East (COMNAVFE) Shipping Control Authority for Japan (SCAJAP), which the ship was re-designated as Q088.

Military Sea Transportation Service acquired the ship on 31 March 1952 and re-designated again as T-LST-399. On 1 November 1973, the T-LST-399 was struck from the Naval Register and was put into the mothball state at the Suisun Bay Reserve Fleet, California. She was later scrapped.

According to NavSource, the ship was reinstated and renamed as IX-511, later struck from the Naval Register on 15 June 1985.

LST-399 earned five battle stars for World War II service.

== Awards ==
- Combat Action Ribbon
- Navy Unit Commendation
- American Campaign Medal
- Asiatic-Pacific Campaign Medal (5 battle stars)
- World War II Victory Medal
- Navy Occupation Service Medal (with Asia clasp)
- National Defense Service Medal
