= USS LST-450 =

LST-1-class tank landing ship built for the United States Navy

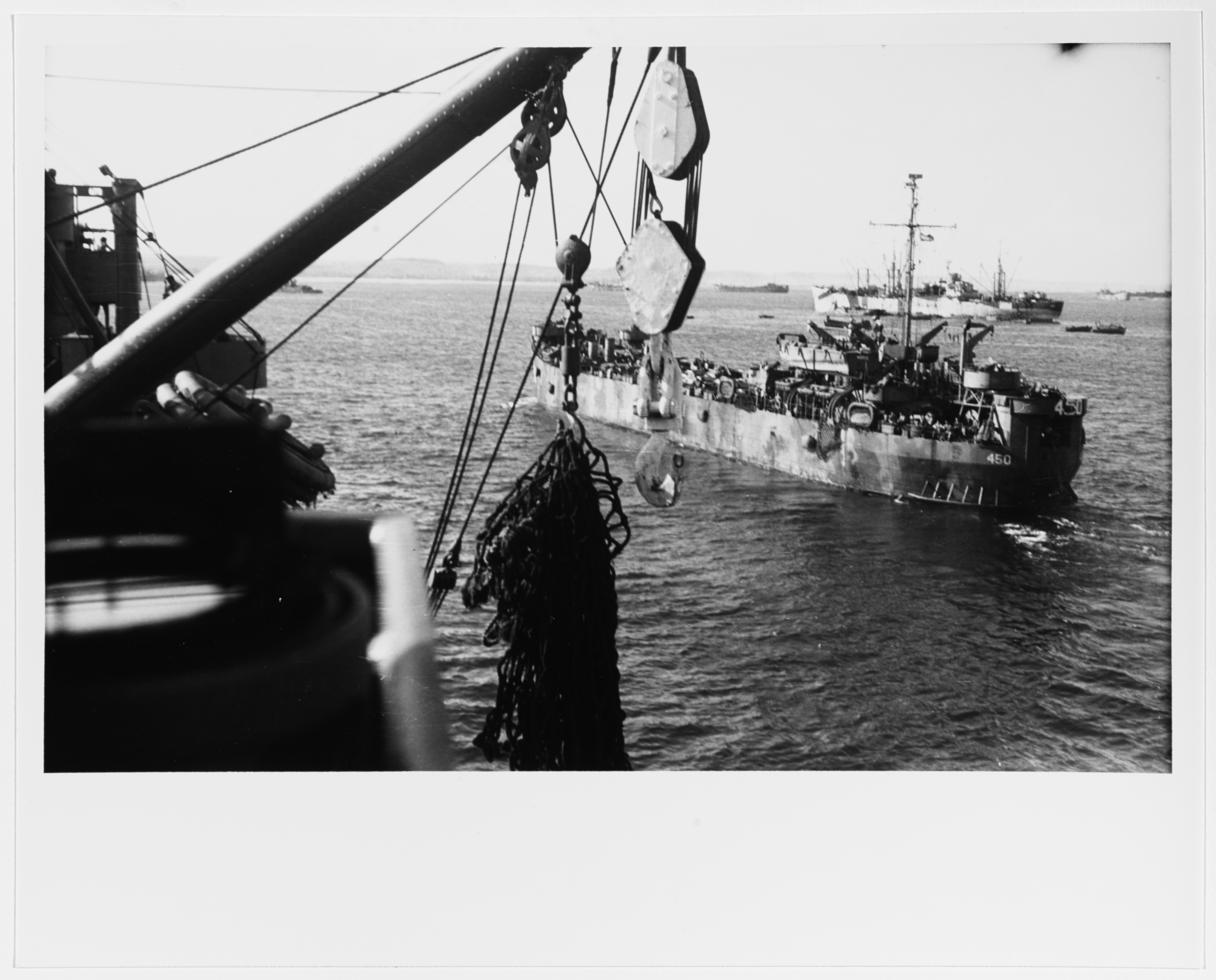
- USS LST-450 c. 1944, probably during the Marianas operation.

History

United States
- Name: LST-450
- Ordered: as a Type S3-M-K2 hull, MCE hull 970
- Builder: Permanente Metals Corporation, Richmond, California
- Yard number: 154
- Laid down: 10 July 1942
- Launched: 4 October 1942
- Commissioned: 6 January 1943
- Decommissioned: 8 April 1946
- Reclassified: Landing Ship Tank (Hospital) LST(H)-450, 15 September 1945
- Stricken: 17 April 1946
- Identification: Hull symbol: LST-450; Hull symbol: LST(H)-450; Code letters: NFEC
- Honors and awards: 3 × battle stars
- Fate: Sold for scrapping, 16 April 1948

General characteristics
- Class & type: LST-1-class tank landing ship
- Displacement: 4,080 long tons (4,145 t) full load; 2,160 long tons (2,190 t) landing
- Length: 328 ft (100 m) oa
- Beam: 50 ft (15 m)
- Draft: Full load: 8 ft 2 in (2.49 m) forward; 14 ft 1 in (4.29 m) aft; Landing at 2,160 t: 3 ft 11 in (1.19 m) forward; 9 ft 10 in (3.00 m) aft
- Installed power: 2 × 900 hp (670 kW) Electro-Motive Diesel 12-567A diesel engines; 1,700 shp (1,300 kW)
- Propulsion: 1 × Falk main reduction gears; 2 × Propellers
- Speed: 12 kn (22 km/h; 14 mph)
- Range: 24,000 nmi (44,000 km; 28,000 mi) at 9 kn (17 km/h; 10 mph) while displacing 3,960 long tons (4,024 t)
- Boats & landing craft carried: 2 or 6 x LCVPs
- Capacity: 2,100 tons oceangoing maximum; 350 tons main deckload
- Troops: 16 officers, 147 enlisted men
- Complement: 13 officers, 104 enlisted men
- Armament: Varied, ultimate armament; 2 × twin 40 mm (1.57 in) Bofors guns; 4 × single 40 mm Bofors guns; 12 × 20 mm (0.79 in) Oerlikon cannons

Service record
- Part of: LST Flotilla 13
- Operations: Capture and occupation of Saipan (15 June–30 July 1944); Tinian Capture and occupation (24–30 July 1944); Assault and occupation of Okinawa Gunto (April 1945)
- Awards: Navy Unit Commendation; American Campaign Medal; Asiatic–Pacific Campaign Medal; World War II Victory Medal

USS LST/LST(H)-450 was an LST-1-class tank landing ship built for the United States Navy during World War II.

== Construction ==
LST-450 was laid down on 10 July 1942, under Maritime Commission (MARCOM) contract, MC hull 970, by Kaiser Shipyards, Vancouver, Washington; launched on 4 October 1942; and commissioned on 6 January 1943.

== Service history ==
During World War II, LST-450 was assigned to the Asiatic-Pacific Theater and participated in the following operations: the capture and occupation of Saipan in June and July 1944; the capture and occupation of Tinian in July 1944; and the assault and occupation of Okinawa Gunto April 1945.

== Post-war service ==
Following the war, LST-450 was redesignated LST(H)-450 on 15 September 1945. She performed occupation duty in the Far East until early December 1945. Upon her return to the United States, she was decommissioned on 8 April 1946, and struck from the Navy list on 17 April that same year. On 16 April 1948, the ship was sold to the Bethlehem Steel Co., of Bethlehem, Pennsylvania, and subsequently scrapped.

== Awards ==
LST-450 earned three battle stars for World War II service.

== Notes ==
Citations

== Bibliography ==
Online resources

- "LST-450". Dictionary of American Naval Fighting Ships. Naval History and Heritage Command. This article incorporates text from this source, which is in the public domain.
- "Kaiser Vancouver, Vancouver WA". www.ShipbuildingHistory.com. 27 November 2010.
- "USS LST-450". NavSource. 17 October 2014.
