= USS LST-950 =

1944 LST-542-class tank landing ship

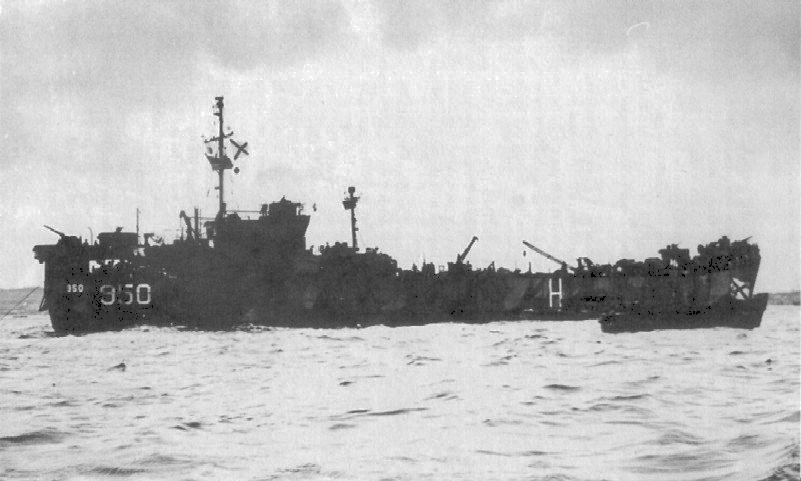
- USS LST-950 at anchor, probably off the beachhead at Okinawa, c. April 1945. LST-950 was used to carry casualties to the hospital ships from the Okinawa beachhead. Note the large "H" painted on her side. The LST and the small boats in the right foreground are also flying an "X" flag to signify their missions.

History

United States
- Name: LST-950
- Builder: Bethlehem-Hingham Shipyard, Hingham, Massachusetts
- Yard number: 3420
- Laid down: 1 September 1944
- Launched: 4 October 1944
- Commissioned: 27 October 1944
- Decommissioned: 18 July 1946
- Reclassified: Landing Ship Tank (Hospital), 15 September 1945
- Stricken: 23 September 1946
- Identification: Hull symbol: LST-950; Hull symbol: LST(H)-950; Code letters: NVVA
- Honors and awards: 1 × battle star
- Fate: Sold for scrapping, 8 March 1948

General characteristics
- Class & type: LST-542-class tank landing ship
- Displacement: 1,625 long tons (1,651 t) (light); 4,080 long tons (4,145 t) (full (seagoing draft with 1,675 short tons (1,520 t) load); 2,366 long tons (2,404 t) (beaching)
- Length: 328 ft (100 m) oa
- Beam: 50 ft (15 m)
- Draft: Unloaded: 2 ft 4 in (0.71 m) forward; 7 ft 6 in (2.29 m) aft; Full load: 8 ft 3 in (2.51 m) forward; 14 ft 1 in (4.29 m) aft; Landing with 500 short tons (450 t) load: 3 ft 11 in (1.19 m) forward; 9 ft 10 in (3.00 m) aft; Limiting 11 ft 2 in (3.40 m); Maximum navigation 14 ft 1 in (4.29 m)
- Installed power: 2 × 900 hp (670 kW) Electro-Motive Diesel 12-567A diesel engines; 1,800 shp (1,300 kW)
- Propulsion: 1 × Falk main reduction gears; 2 × Propellers
- Speed: 11.6 kn (21.5 km/h; 13.3 mph)
- Range: 24,000 nmi (44,000 km; 28,000 mi) at 9 kn (17 km/h; 10 mph) while displacing 3,960 long tons (4,024 t)
- Boats & landing craft carried: 2 x LCVPs
- Capacity: 1,600–1,900 short tons (3,200,000–3,800,000 lb; 1,500,000–1,700,000 kg) cargo depending on mission
- Troops: 16 officers, 147 enlisted men
- Complement: 13 officers, 104 enlisted men
- Armament: Varied, ultimate armament; 2 × twin 40 mm (1.57 in) Bofors guns; 4 × single 40 mm Bofors guns; 12 × 20 mm (0.79 in) Oerlikon cannons

Service record
- Part of: LST Flotilla 25
- Operations: Assault and occupation of Okinawa Gunto (1 April–18 June 1945)
- Awards: American Campaign Medal; Asiatic–Pacific Campaign Medal; World War II Victory Medal; Navy Occupation Service Medal w/Asia Clasp

USS LST-950/LST(H)-950 was an LST-542-class tank landing ship in the United States Navy. Like many of her class, she was not named and is properly referred to by her hull designation.

== Construction ==
LST-950 was laid down on 1 September 1944, at Hingham, Massachusetts, by the Bethlehem-Hingham Shipyard; launched on 4 October 1944; sponsored by Mrs. C. C. Recca; and commissioned on 27 October 1944.

== Service history ==
During World War II, LST-950 was assigned to the Asiatic-Pacific theater and participated in the assault and occupation of Okinawa Gunto from April through June 1945.

On 15 September 1945, she was redesignated LST(H)-950 and performed occupation duty in the Far East until early November 1945. The tank landing ship was decommissioned on 23 September 1946, and struck from the Navy list on 10 June 1947. On 8 March 1948, the ship was sold to the Ships Power & Equipment Corp., of Barber, New Jersey, for scrapping.

== Awards ==
LST-950 earned one battle star for World War II service.

== Bibliography ==
Online resources

- "LST-950". Dictionary of American Naval Fighting Ships. Naval History and Heritage Command. This article incorporates text from this source, which is in the public domain.
- "Bethlehem-Hingham, Hingham MA". www.ShipbuildingHistory.com. 11 August 2011.
- "USS LST-950". NavSource. 6 November 2015.
