= USS LST-931 =

1944 LST-542-class tank landing ship

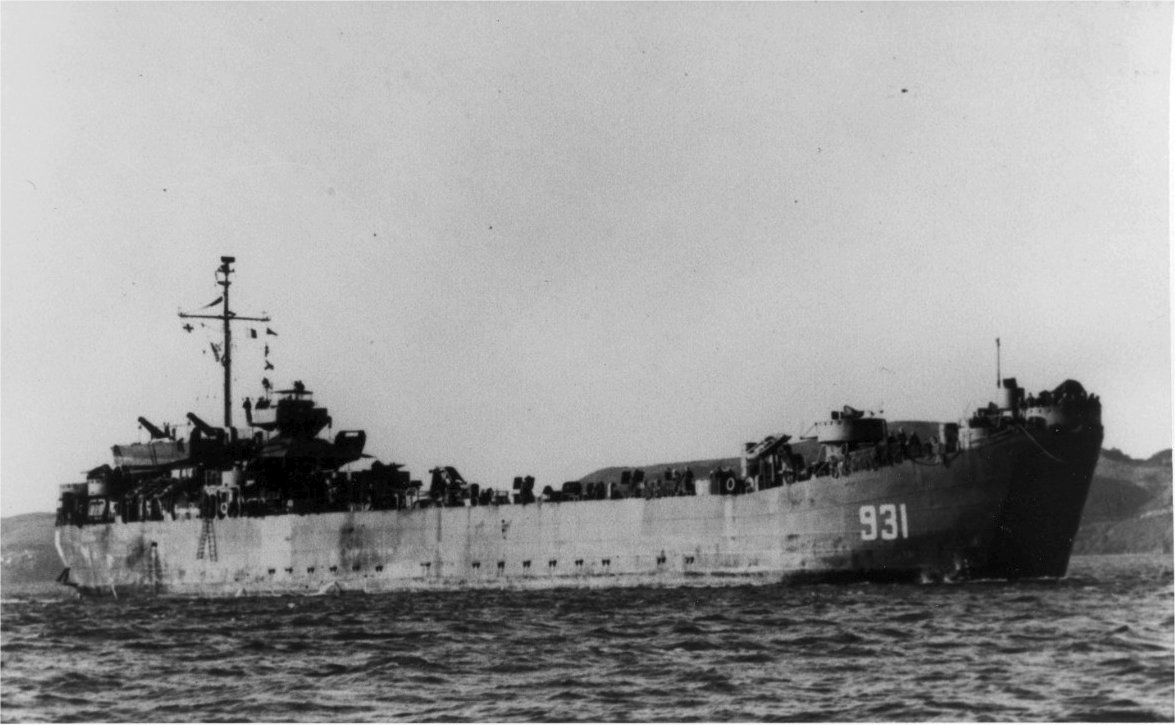
- USS LST-931 in San Francisco Bay, c. 1945–1946.

History

United States
- Name: LST-931
- Builder: Bethlehem-Hingham Shipyard, Hingham, Massachusetts
- Yard number: 3401
- Laid down: 13 June 1944
- Launched: 19 July 1944
- Commissioned: 11 August 1944
- Decommissioned: 26 June 1946
- Reclassified: Landing Ship Tank (Hospital), 15 September 1945
- Stricken: 31 July 1946
- Identification: Hull symbol: LST-931; Hull symbol: LST(H)-931; Code letters: NVSH
- Honors and awards: 2 × battle star
- Fate: Sold for scrapping, 12 June 1948

General characteristics
- Class & type: LST-542-class tank landing ship
- Displacement: 1,625 long tons (1,651 t) (light); 4,080 long tons (4,145 t) (full (seagoing draft with 1,675 short tons (1,520 t) load); 2,366 long tons (2,404 t) (beaching)
- Length: 328 ft (100 m) oa
- Beam: 50 ft (15 m)
- Draft: Unloaded: 2 ft 4 in (0.71 m) forward; 7 ft 6 in (2.29 m) aft; Full load: 8 ft 3 in (2.51 m) forward; 14 ft 1 in (4.29 m) aft; Landing with 500 short tons (450 t) load: 3 ft 11 in (1.19 m) forward; 9 ft 10 in (3.00 m) aft; Limiting 11 ft 2 in (3.40 m); Maximum navigation 14 ft 1 in (4.29 m)
- Installed power: 2 × 900 hp (670 kW) Electro-Motive Diesel 12-567A diesel engines; 1,800 shp (1,300 kW)
- Propulsion: 1 × Falk main reduction gears; 2 × Propellers
- Speed: 11.6 kn (21.5 km/h; 13.3 mph)
- Range: 24,000 nmi (44,000 km; 28,000 mi) at 9 kn (17 km/h; 10 mph) while displacing 3,960 long tons (4,024 t)
- Boats & landing craft carried: 2 x LCVPs
- Capacity: 1,600–1,900 short tons (3,200,000–3,800,000 lb; 1,500,000–1,700,000 kg) cargo depending on mission
- Troops: 16 officers, 147 enlisted men
- Complement: 13 officers, 104 enlisted men
- Armament: Varied, ultimate armament; 2 × twin 40 mm (1.57 in) Bofors guns; 4 × single 40 mm Bofors guns; 12 × 20 mm (0.79 in) Oerlikon cannons

Service record
- Part of: LST Flotilla 21
- Operations: Assault and occupation of Iwo Jima (19–28 February 1945); Assault and occupation of Okinawa Gunto (1 April–7 June 1945)
- Awards: American Campaign Medal; Asiatic–Pacific Campaign Medal; World War II Victory Medal; Navy Occupation Service Medal w/Asia Clasp

USS LST-931/LST(H)-931 was an LST-542-class tank landing ship in the United States Navy. Like many of her class, she was not named and is properly referred to by her hull designation.

== Construction ==
LST-931 was laid down on 13 June 1944, at Hingham, Massachusetts, by the Bethlehem-Hingham Shipyard; launched on 19 July 1944; and commissioned on 11 August 1944.

== Service history ==
During World War II, LST-931 was assigned to the Asiatic-Pacific theater and participated in the assault and occupation of Iwo Jima in February 1945, and the assault and occupation of Okinawa Gunto from April through June 1945.

On 15 September 1945, she was redesignated LST(H)-931 and performed occupation duty in the Far East until late October 1945. The tank landing ship was decommissioned on 26 June 1946, and struck from the Navy list on 31 July, that same year. On 12 June 1948, she was sold to the Walter W. Johnson Co., for scrapping.

== Awards ==
LST-931 earned two battle star for World War II service.

== Bibliography ==
Online resources

- "LST-931". Dictionary of American Naval Fighting Ships. Naval History and Heritage Command. This article incorporates text from this source, which is in the public domain.
- "Bethlehem-Hingham, Hingham MA". www.ShipbuildingHistory.com. 11 August 2011.
- "USS LST-931". NavSource. 17 February 2017.
