= USS LST-930 =

1944 LST-542-class tank landing ship

History

United States
- Name: LST-930
- Builder: Bethlehem-Hingham Shipyard, Hingham, Massachusetts
- Yard number: 3400
- Laid down: 9 June 1944
- Launched: 12 July 1944
- Commissioned: 6 August 1944
- Decommissioned: 26 June 1946
- Reclassified: Landing Ship Tank (Hospital), 15 September 1945
- Stricken: 31 July 1946
- Identification: Hull symbol: LST-930; Hull symbol: LST(H)-930; Code letters: NVSF
- Honors and awards: 2 × battle star
- Fate: Sold for operation, 8 June 1948

General characteristics
- Class & type: LST-542-class tank landing ship
- Displacement: 1,625 long tons (1,651 t) (light); 4,080 long tons (4,145 t) (full (seagoing draft with 1,675 short tons (1,520 t) load); 2,366 long tons (2,404 t) (beaching)
- Length: 328 ft (100 m) oa
- Beam: 50 ft (15 m)
- Draft: Unloaded: 2 ft 4 in (0.71 m) forward; 7 ft 6 in (2.29 m) aft; Full load: 8 ft 3 in (2.51 m) forward; 14 ft 1 in (4.29 m) aft; Landing with 500 short tons (450 t) load: 3 ft 11 in (1.19 m) forward; 9 ft 10 in (3.00 m) aft; Limiting 11 ft 2 in (3.40 m); Maximum navigation 14 ft 1 in (4.29 m)
- Installed power: 2 × 900 hp (670 kW) Electro-Motive Diesel 12-567A diesel engines; 1,800 shp (1,300 kW)
- Propulsion: 1 × Falk main reduction gears; 2 × Propellers
- Speed: 11.6 kn (21.5 km/h; 13.3 mph)
- Range: 24,000 nmi (44,000 km; 28,000 mi) at 9 kn (17 km/h; 10 mph) while displacing 3,960 long tons (4,024 t)
- Boats & landing craft carried: 2 x LCVPs
- Capacity: 1,600–1,900 short tons (3,200,000–3,800,000 lb; 1,500,000–1,700,000 kg) cargo depending on mission
- Troops: 16 officers, 147 enlisted men
- Complement: 13 officers, 104 enlisted men
- Armament: Varied, ultimate armament; 2 × twin 40 mm (1.57 in) Bofors guns; 4 × single 40 mm Bofors guns; 12 × 20 mm (0.79 in) Oerlikon cannons

Service record
- Part of: LST Flotilla 6
- Operations: Assault and occupation of Iwo Jima (19–28 February 1945); Assault and occupation of Okinawa Gunto (1 April–30 June 1945)
- Awards: American Campaign Medal; Asiatic–Pacific Campaign Medal; World War II Victory Medal; Navy Occupation Service Medal w/Asia Clasp

USS LST-930/LST(H)-930 was an LST-542-class tank landing ship in the United States Navy. Like many of her class, she was not named and is properly referred to by her hull designation.

== Construction ==
LST-930 was laid down on 9 June 1944, at Hingham, Massachusetts, by the Bethlehem-Hingham Shipyard; launched on 12 July 1944; and commissioned on 6 August 1944.

== Service history ==
During World War II, LST-930 was assigned to the Asiatic-Pacific theater and participated in the assault and occupation of Iwo Jima in February 1945, and the assault and occupation of Okinawa Gunto from April through June 1945.

On 15 September 1945, she was redesignated LST(H)-930 and performed occupation duty in the Far East until late October 1945. The ship returned to the United States and was decommissioned on 26 June 1946, and struck from the Navy list on 31 July, that same year. On 8 June 1948, the ship was sold to the Humble Oil and Refining Co., Houston, Texas, for operation.

== Awards ==
LST-930 earned two battle star for World War II service.

== Bibliography ==
Online resources

- "LST-930". Dictionary of American Naval Fighting Ships. Naval History and Heritage Command. This article incorporates text from this source, which is in the public domain.
- "Bethlehem-Hingham, Hingham MA". www.ShipbuildingHistory.com. 11 August 2011.
- "USS LST-930". NavSource. 6 November 2015.
