= USS LST-84 =

U.S. World War II ship

History

United States
- Name: USS LST-84
- Builder: Jeffersonville Boat & Machine Co., Jeffersonville, Indiana
- Laid down: 13 April 1943
- Launched: 26 June 1943
- Commissioned: 14 August 1943
- Decommissioned: 2 March 1946
- Reclassified: LST(H)-84 (Landing Ship, Tank (Hospital)) 15 September 1945
- Stricken: 31 October 1948
- Honours and awards: 5 battle stars (WWII)
- Fate: Scrapped, 20 April 1948

General characteristics
- Class & type: LST-1-class tank landing ship
- Displacement: 1,780 long tons (1,809 t) light; 3,880 long tons (3,942 t) full
- Length: 328 ft (100 m)
- Beam: 50 ft (15 m)
- Draft: Unloaded: Bow: 2 ft 4 in (0.71 m); Stern: 7 ft 6 in (2.29 m); Loaded : Bow: 8 ft 2 in (2.49 m); Stern: 14 ft 1 in (4.29 m)
- Propulsion: 2 General Motors 12-567 diesel engines, two shafts, twin rudders
- Speed: 12 knots (22 km/h; 14 mph)
- Boats & landing craft carried: Two to six LCVPs
- Troops: approx. 140 officers and enlisted
- Complement: 8-10 officers, 100-115 enlisted
- Armament: 1 × 3"/50 caliber gun mount; 5 × 40 mm gun mounts; 6 × 20 mm gun mounts; 2 × .50 cal (12.7 mm) machine guns; 4 × .30 cal (7.62 mm) machine guns

USS LST-84 was one of the hundreds of Tank landing ships built during World War II to support amphibious military operations. Her role was to carry significant quantities of vehicles, cargo, and troops directly onto an unimproved shore. The ship was sponsored by Mrs. W. Raymond Brendel. The ship was constructed inland at Jeffersonville, Indiana, by the Jeffersonville Boat & Machine Co. as coastal ship yards were used to build larger naval vessels. The ship traversed the Ohio and Mississippi River to reach open water.

== World War II operations ==
During World War II, LST-84 was assigned to the Pacific theater, earning five battle stars for participation in the following operations:

- Gilbert Islands operation,
- Marshall Islands operation, occupation of Kwajalein and Majuro Atolls - February 1944,
- Marianas operation, capture and occupation of Saipan - June and July 1944, capture and occupation Tinian - July 1944,
- Iwo Jima operation, assault and occupation of Iwo Jima - February and March 1945.

== Ship history highlights ==
10 November 1943 - During the Gilbert Island operations, Clamp (ARS-33) conducted salvage operations on LST-84.

17 June 1944 - During the Marianas operation, LST-84 was damaged by another US Navy ship as a result of a friendly fire incident.

21 February 1945 - During the Iwo Jima operation, machine guns of the US Army 506th Anti-Aircraft Gun Battalion, mounted on the deck of LST-84 cooperated with the 40 mm guns of the ship to shoot down a Japanese aircraft during a raid.

17 June 1945 - Following the invasion of Saipan, Admiral Spruance ordered that transports not required for immediate unloading be withdrawn from the Saipan area. In the early evening, shortly after a convoy, including LST-84, got underway it was attacked by a formation of Japanese aircraft. LST-84 was struck by a bomb and set afire. The fire raged furiously for some time but the blaze was brought under control by the crew with assistance from the Cinchona (AN-12). The damage was not vital and LST-84 was able to continue with the convoy.

== Refit as hospital ship ==
Just prior to the end of World War II, LST-84 was refitted as a hospital ship and recommissioned Landing Ship Tank (Hospital) LST(H)-84. She continued in this role during the post-war occupation until early March 1946.

== Fate ==
Upon her return to the United States, the ship was decommissioned on 2 March 1946 and struck from the Navy list on 31 October 1947. On 20 April 1948, she was sold to the Bethlehem Steel Co. who scrapped the ship in Seattle, Washington.

== See also ==
- List of United States Navy LSTs
- LSTH
