= USS LST-1033 =

LST-542-class landing ship tank

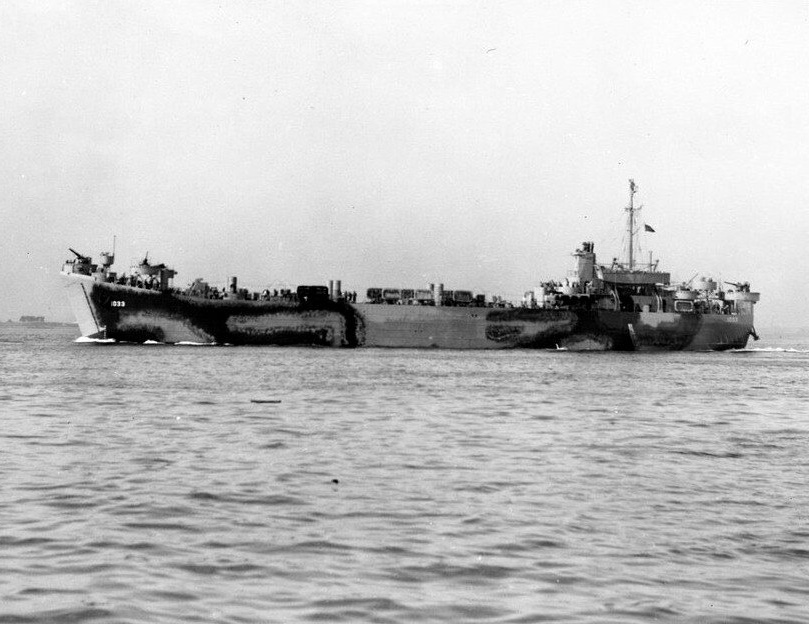
- USS LST-1033 on 11 August 1944

History

United States
- Name: LST-1033
- Builder: Boston Navy Yard, Boston
- Laid down: 9 June 1944
- Launched: 9 July 1944
- Sponsored by: Mrs. Mary Theresa O'Donnell
- Commissioned: 12 August 1944
- Decommissioned: 28 August 1946
- Renamed: LST(H)-1033, 1945
- Stricken: 3 July 1946
- Identification: Callsign: NVPF
- Honors and awards: See Awards
- Fate: Sold to commercial service, 1947

Taiwan
- Name: Chung Sheng; (中勝)
- Acquired: 1 May 1949
- Commissioned: 1 May 1949
- Decommissioned: 5 February 1996
- Reclassified: LST-222, 13 November 1957; LST-686, 1 January 1976; LST-222, 1 October 1979
- Identification: Hull number: LST-211
- Fate: Sunk, 5 February 1985

General characteristics
- Class & type: LST-542-class tank landing ship
- Displacement: 1,625 long tons (1,651 t) light; 4,080 long tons (4,145 t) full
- Length: 328 ft (100 m)
- Beam: 50 ft (15 m)
- Draft: Unloaded : 2 ft 4 in (0.71 m) forward; 7 ft 6 in (2.29 m) aft; Loaded : 8 ft 2 in (2.49 m) forward; 14 ft 1 in (4.29 m) aft
- Propulsion: 2 × General Motors 12-567 diesel engines, two shafts, twin rudders
- Speed: 12 knots (22 km/h; 14 mph)
- Boats & landing craft carried: 2 × LCVPs
- Troops: 16 officers, 147 enlisted men
- Complement: 7 officers, 104 enlisted men
- Armament: 8 × 40 mm guns; 12 × 20 mm guns

USS LST-1033 was a LST-542-class tank landing ship in the United States Navy during World War II. She was transferred to the Republic of China Navy as ROCS Chung Sheng (LST-211).

== Construction and commissioning ==
LST-1033 was laid down on 9 June 1944 at Boston Navy Yard, Boston, Massachusetts. Launched on 9 July 1944 and commissioned on 12 August 1944.

=== Service in United States Navy ===
During World War II, LST-1033 was assigned to the Asiatic-Pacific theater. On 15 September 1945, she was redesignated Landing Ship, Tank (Hospital) with pennant numbers LST(H)-1033. She then participated in the Assault and occupation of Iwo Jima at Green Beach from 19 to 28 February 1945 and Assault and occupation of Okinawa Gunto from 1 April to 30 June 1945. She was assigned to occupation and China from 29 October 1945 to 15 July 1946.

She was decommissioned on 28 August 1946 and struck from the Naval Register on 3 July 1946 after she was sold to Philippine for commercial service on 5 December 1947. She was then sold to the Republic of China and renamed Chung Sheng (LST-211).

=== Service in Republic of China Navy ===
In February 1950, she participated in the Battle of Hainan Island. She intercepted the signal of a merchant ship who wanted to join the Communist Party near Hong Kong waters, and prevented a British gunboat from sailing near Nanshanwei.

On 1 November 1952, four 25mm guns were dismantled, and four 40mm single-barrel guns and twelve 20mm guns were installed.

In March 1954, when the Communist army invaded Yangyu, the ship was responsible for transporting and replenishing military supplies to support the friendly forces to the island and mountain. Within 1 week, there was a level 8 wind from Keelung, the islands of Luyangyu were secured.

On 1 April 1954, she was ordered to remove one 40-mm single-barreled gun at the bow and stern of the ship, and replace them with 40-mm twin-barreled guns. In addition, the Type 51 Type 2 fire control commander 2 was installed.

In February 1955, during the Battle of Dachen Archipelago, the ship ventured to carry friendly personnel and supplies 2 times in the dark under bad weather, all of which were able to successfully complete the mission.

In October 1955, the ship collided with the Taisheng ship of the Minsheng Company.

On 1 October 1957, her pennant number was changed to LST-222.

In September 1958, the ship delivered supplies and equipment to Kinmen many times, and successfully completed the mission. However, her seventh voyage was carried out on September 16. When the ship's bow springboard was slightly damaged and deformed, it lost an amphibious landing combat vehicle (LVT) that was being unloaded. In April 50th, the Republic of China was changed to land in the Second Fleet, and the serial number remained unchanged.

In November 1967, four more 20mm guns were removed.

On 1 January 1976, she was ordered to change her number to LST-686. Then in June, four 50 cal machine guns were added.

On 1 October 1979, she was ordered to change back her number to the original LST-222.

In January 1980, another No. 62 fire control system was installed.

On 5 October 1995, the ship ran aground on the shore of Yehliu and sat on a reef and was scrapped. When returning from Matsu to Keelung, the main engine malfunctioned and drifted to Yehliu hit the reef. It was during the strong winter monsoon and rescue operations were difficult. At that time, due to the intensive operation, the operations were cancelled and the plans were changed. The navy is planning to eliminate a batch of landing ships. Perhaps the damages of the ship have not been repaired. Perhaps due to the difficulty of on-site operations and the severe damage of the ship. The ship was decommissioned early, but she was too ugly to be placed in the Yehliu tourist area. Perhaps it was a policy guidelines. The ship was towed out by the Great Lakes ship at 8:30 am on February 5, 1985, and sank at 10:50. 2500 yards north of Yeliu. At that time, the captain of the ship was Pannan Village.

== Awards ==
LST-1033 have earned the following awards:

- China Service Medal (extended)
- American Campaign Medal
- Asiatic-Pacific Campaign Medal (2 battle stars)
- World War II Victory Medal
- Navy Occupation Service Medal (with Asia clasp)
- Combat Action Ribbon (retroactive, Iwo Jima, 19 February 1945)

== Sources ==
- United States. Dept. of the Treasury (1962). Treasury Decisions Under the Customs, Internal Revenue, Industrial Alcohol, Narcotic and Other Laws, Volume 97. U.S. Government Printing Office.
- Moore, Capt. John (1984). Jane's Fighting Ships 1984-85. Jane's Information Group. ISBN 978-0710607959.
- Saunders, Stephen (2009). Jane's Fighting Ships 2009-2010. Jane's Information Group. ISBN 978-0710628886.
- Fairplay International Shipping Journal Volume 222. United Kingdom: Fairplay Publishing Limited. 1967.
