= USS LST-41 =

1943 LST-1-class tank landing ship

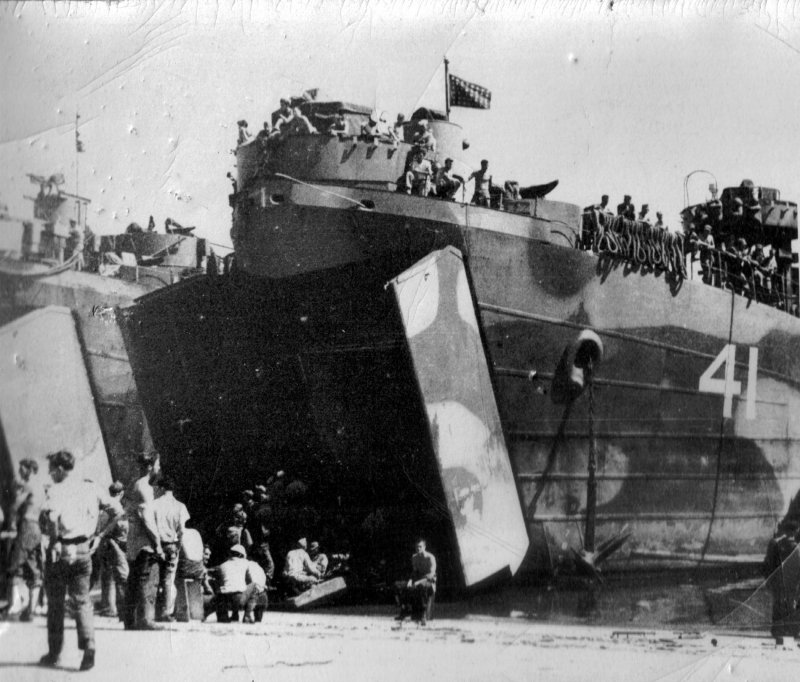
- USS LST-41 beached, date and location unknown

History

United States
- Name: LST-41
- Builder: Dravo Corporation, Pittsburgh, Pennsylvania
- Laid down: 24 May 1943
- Launched: 17 August 1943
- Commissioned: 24 September 1943
- Decommissioned: 25 April 1946
- Reclassified: Tank Landing Ship (Hospital), 15 September 1945
- Stricken: 19 June 1946
- Identification: Hull symbol: LST-41; Hull symbol: LST(H)-41; Code letters: NPCG
- Honors and awards: 5 × battle stars
- Fate: Sold, 13 October 1947 and scrapped

General characteristics
- Type: LST-1-class tank landing ship
- Displacement: 4,080 long tons (4,145 t) full load; 2,160 long tons (2,190 t) landing
- Length: 328 ft (100 m) oa
- Beam: 50 ft (15 m)
- Draft: Full load: 8 ft 2 in (2.49 m) forward; 14 ft 1 in (4.29 m) aft; Landing at 2,160 t: 3 ft 11 in (1.19 m) forward; 9 ft 10 in (3.00 m) aft
- Installed power: 2 × 900 hp (670 kW) Electro-Motive Diesel 12-567A diesel engines; 1,700 shp (1,300 kW)
- Propulsion: 1 × Falk main reduction gears; 2 × Propellers
- Speed: 12 kn (22 km/h; 14 mph)
- Range: 24,000 nmi (44,000 km; 28,000 mi) at 9 kn (17 km/h; 10 mph) while displacing 3,960 long tons (4,024 t)
- Boats & landing craft carried: 2 or 6 x LCVPs
- Capacity: 2,100 tons oceangoing maximum; 350 tons main deckload
- Troops: 16 officers, 147 enlisted men
- Complement: 13 officers, 104 enlisted men
- Armament: Varied, ultimate armament; 2 × twin 40 mm (1.57 in) Bofors guns; 4 × single 40 mm Bofors guns; 12 × 20 mm (0.79 in) Oerlikon cannons

Service record
- Part of: LST Flotilla 13
- Operations: Marshall Islands operation; Occupation of Kwajalein and Majuro Atolls (31 January–8 February 1944); Hollandia operation (21–29 April 1944); Marianas operation; Capture and occupation of Guam (21–25 July 1944); Battle of Peleliu (6 September–14 October 1944); Battle of Luzon Lingayen Gulf landings (9 January 1945)
- Awards: China Service Medal; American Campaign Medal; Asiatic–Pacific Campaign Medal; World War II Victory Medal; Navy Occupation Service Medal w/Asia Clasp; Philippine Republic Presidential Unit Citation; Philippine Liberation Medal

USS LST-41 was a United States Navy LST-1-class tank landing ship used exclusively in the Asiatic-Pacific Theater during World War II. Like many of her class, she was not named and is properly referred to by her hull designation.

== Construction ==
LST-41 was laid down on 24 May 1943, at Pittsburgh, Pennsylvania by the Dravo Corporation; launched on 17 August 1943; sponsored by Mrs Mary Spisak; and commissioned on 24 September 1943.

== Service history ==
During World War II, LST-41 was assigned to the Asiatic-Pacific theater.

Following the war, LST-41 was redesignated LST(H)-41 on 15 September 1945. She performed occupation duty in the Far East until late November 1945.

Upon her return to the United States, the ship was decommissioned on 25 April 1946, and struck from the Navy list on 19 June 1946. On 8 October 1947, she was sold to J. C. Berkwit & Co., of New York City, N.Y.

== Awards ==
LST-41 earned five battle stars for World War II service.

== Bibliography ==
- "LST-41". Dictionary of American Naval Fighting Ships. Naval History and Heritage Command. This article incorporates text from this source, which is in the public domain.
- "USS LST-41". NavSource. 4 July 2014.
