= USS LST-464 =

1942 LST-1-class tank landing ship

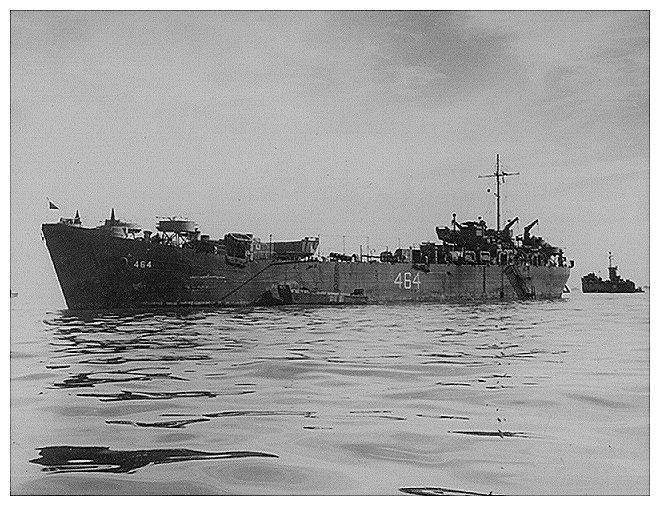
- USS LST(H)-464, in San Francisco Bay, California, c. late 1945.

History

United States
- Name: LST-464
- Ordered: as a Type S3-M-K2 hull, MCE hull 984
- Builder: Kaiser Shipbuilding Company, Vancouver, Washington
- Yard number: 168
- Laid down: 10 October 1942
- Launched: 12 November 1942
- Commissioned: 25 February 1943
- Decommissioned: 16 April 1946
- Reclassified: Landing Ship Tank (Hospital), 15 September 1945
- Stricken: 19 June 1946
- Identification: Hull symbol: LST-464; Hull symbol: LST(H)-464; Code letters:NFQV
- Honors and awards: 2 × battle stars
- Fate: Sold, 5 March 1948

General characteristics
- Class & type: LST-1-class tank landing ship
- Displacement: 4,080 long tons (4,145 t) full load; 2,160 long tons (2,190 t) landing
- Length: 328 ft (100 m) oa
- Beam: 50 ft (15 m)
- Draft: Full load: 8 ft 2 in (2.49 m) forward; 14 ft 1 in (4.29 m) aft; Landing at 2,160 t: 3 ft 11 in (1.19 m) forward; 9 ft 10 in (3.00 m) aft
- Installed power: 2 × 900 hp (670 kW) Electro-Motive Diesel 12-567A diesel engines; 1,700 shp (1,300 kW)
- Propulsion: 1 × Falk main reduction gears; 2 × Propellers
- Speed: 12 kn (22 km/h; 14 mph)
- Range: 24,000 nmi (44,000 km; 28,000 mi) at 9 kn (17 km/h; 10 mph) while displacing 3,960 long tons (4,024 t)
- Boats & landing craft carried: 2 or 6 x LCVPs
- Capacity: 2,100 tons oceangoing maximum; 350 tons main deckload
- Troops: 16 officers, 147 enlisted men
- Complement: 13 officers, 104 enlisted men
- Armament: Varied, ultimate armament; 2 × twin 40 mm (1.57 in) Bofors guns; 4 × single 40 mm Bofors guns; 12 × 20 mm (0.79 in) Oerlikon cannons

Service record
- Operations: Leyte landings (18 October–29 November 1944)
- Awards: Navy Unit Commendation; American Campaign Medal; Asiatic–Pacific Campaign Medal; World War II Victory Medal; Philippine Republic Presidential Unit Citation; Philippine Liberation Medal

USS LST-464/LST(H)-464 was a United States Navy LST-1-class tank landing ship used in the Asiatic-Pacific Theater during World War II.

== Construction ==
LST-464 was laid down on 10 October 1942, under Maritime Commission (MARCOM) contract, MC hull 984, by Kaiser Shipyards, Vancouver, Washington; launched 12 November 1942; and commissioned on 25 February 1943.

LST-464 was converted into a "first aid ship" at Sydney, Australia, in 1943. These modifications included the installation in the tank deck bulkhead of a watertight door to allow access to the forward troop compartment from both the starboard and port sides of the ship. Spaces were also converted to receiving, sterilizer, and operating rooms. On the tank deck, 78 hospital beds, refrigerators, lockers, toilets and wash basins were installed. LST-464's medical staff was increased to six doctors, one dentist and a number of corpsmen.

== Service history ==
During the war, LST-464 was assigned to the Asiatic-Pacific Theater. She took part in supporting and consolidations designated by Commander 7th Fleet from May through October 1944; and the Leyte operation in October and November 1944.

== Post-war service ==
Following the war, LST-464 was redesignated LST(H)-464 on 15 September, and performed occupation duty in the Far East until late September 1945. The tank landing ship returned to the United States and was decommissioned on 16 April 1946, and struck from the Navy list on 19 June 1946. On 5 March 1948, she was sold to the Port Houston Iron Works, Inc., of Houston, Texas, for non-self-propelled operation.

== Honors and awards ==
LST-464 earned two battle stars and the Navy Unit Commendation for her World War II service.

== Notes ==
Citations

== Bibliography ==
Online resources

- "LST-464". Dictionary of American Naval Fighting Ships. Naval History and Heritage Command. This article incorporates text from this source, which is in the public domain.
- "Kaiser Vancouver, Vancouver WA". www.ShipbuildingHistory.com. 27 November 2010.
- "USS LST-464". NavSource. 11 December 2015.
