= USS Douglas County =

World War II tank landing ship

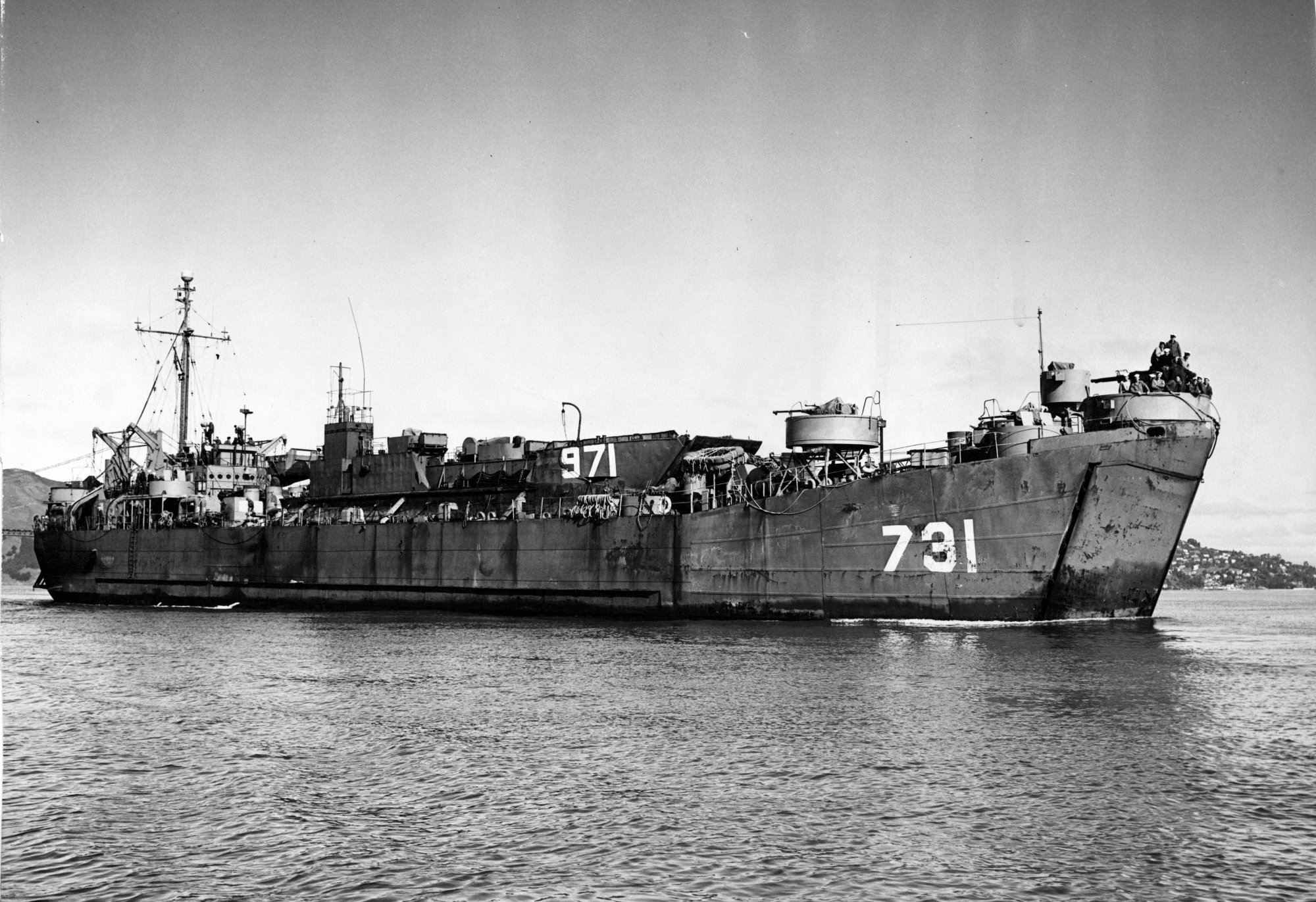
- USS LST-731 with LCT-971 loaded on her main deck, entering a harbor probably in 1946. This is possibly San Francisco Bay.

History

United States
- Name: USS LST-731
- Builder: Dravo Corporation, Neville Island, Pittsburgh
- Laid down: 27 December 1943
- Launched: 12 February 1944
- Commissioned: 30 March 1944
- Decommissioned: 2 June 1950
- Renamed: USS Douglas County (LST-731), 1 July 1955
- Reclassified: LSTH-731, 15 September 1945; LST-731, 6 March 1952
- Stricken: 1 November 1958
- Honours and awards: 2 battle stars (World War II)

General characteristics
- Class & type: LST-542-class tank landing ship
- Displacement: 1,625 long tons (1,651 t) light; 3,640 long tons (3,698 t) full
- Length: 328 ft (100 m)
- Beam: 50 ft (15 m)
- Draft: Unloaded : 2 ft 4 in (0.71 m) forward; 7 ft 6 in (2.29 m) aft; Loaded : 8 ft 2 in (2.49 m) forward; 14 ft 1 in (4.29 m) aft
- Propulsion: 2 × General Motors 12-567 diesel engines, two shafts, twin rudders
- Speed: 12 knots (22 km/h; 14 mph)
- Boats & landing craft carried: 2 LCVPs
- Troops: Approximately 130 officers and enlisted men
- Complement: 8-10 officers, 89-100 enlisted men
- Armament: 1 × single 3"/50 caliber gun mount; 8 × 40 mm guns; 12 × 20 mm guns

USS Douglas County (LST-731) was an LST-542-class tank landing ship built for the United States Navy during World War II. Named after counties in 12 states, she was the only U.S. Naval vessel to bear the name.

LST-731 was laid down on 27 December 1943 at Pittsburgh, Pennsylvania, by the Dravo Corporation of Neville Island; launched on 12 February 1944; sponsored by Mrs. A. J. Ackerman; and commissioned on 30 March 1944.

== Service history ==
During World War II, LST-731 was assigned to the Asiatic-Pacific theater and participated in the following operations: capture and occupation of Guam (July and August, 1944), and assault and occupation of Iwo Jima (February and March, 1945). Following the war, LST-731 was redesignated hospital ship LSTH-731 on 15 September 1945 and performed occupation duty in the Far East until mid-February, 1946. She was decommissioned on 2 June 1950 and redesignated LST-731 on 6 March 1952. The ship received the name USS Douglas County (LST-731) on 1 July 1955 and was struck from the Naval Vessel Register on 1 November 1958. Her final fate is unknown.

LST-731 earned two battle stars for World War II service.

== See also ==
- List of United States Navy LSTs
- LSTH
