= Shipping Control Authority for the Japanese Merchant Marine =

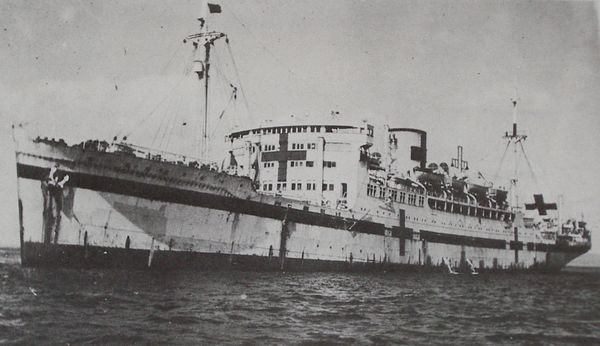
Japanese hospital ship Hikawa Maru

The Shipping Control Authority for the Japanese Merchant Marine (SCAJAP) (Note: Some sources use "Shipping Control Authority for Japanese Merchant Marine," "Shipping Control Authority for Japan" and other minor variants.) was an organization established by Allied forces in the occupation of Japan after the end of World War II.

== Purpose ==
Over six million Japanese were scattered outside Japan throughout the Pacific and Asian areas Japan had occupied with approximately 1,170,000 persons forcibly removed from their homelands in Japan who required repatriation. With over seven and a half million persons requiring transport by sea the remnants of Japan's naval and merchant services were required. Naval vessels were demilitarized and included aircraft carriers, cruisers, destroyers, escorts and troop transports. Hospital ships and merchantmen were available for service without demilitarization and pressed into service. The ships were not in good condition requiring maintenance and repair using Japan's remaining facilities. Scarce parts were obtained from salvage of inoperable Japanese ships and personnel were available from demobilized naval and merchant mariners. Japanese resources could begin work transporting personnel requiring mainly fuel from Allied stocks.

The Joint Chiefs of Staff on 15 September 1945 directed that repatriation and maintenance of a minimum Japanese economy use Japanese shipping to the maximum extent possible and that a survey of shipping be made. The intent was to use Japanese vessels and assets in repatriation with priority for Japanese naval and military personnel moving to Japan. The Imperial Japanese Government was responsible for executing the plans as directed by Allied authorities. Cargo ships were excluded from repatriation operations in order to support the wrecked Japanese economy except when carrying of personnel would not effect their cargo capacity.

== Organization ==
General MacArthur was designated Supreme Commander for the Allied Powers (SCAP) on 14 August 1945. For naval matters U.S. Pacific Fleet Liaison Group with the Supreme Commander for the Allied Powers (FLTLOSCAP) was assigned to SCAP. Initial efforts to effect repatriation were undertaken under FLTLOSCAP until formation of the Shipping Control Authority for Japanese Merchant Marine (SCAJAP) on 12 October 1945. On 6 March 1946 Commander, Naval Activities, Japan (COMNAVJAP) was established with SCAJAP integrated into that command which was physically combined with Commander Naval Forces Far East (COMNAVFE) with specific responsibility for U.S. and Allied naval forces in the occupation of Japan, both afloat and ashore and including SCAJAP. The Japanese Ministry of Transportation and the Ministry of Navy, until that ministry was dissolved in December 1945, executed the directives of SCAJAP for operations.

== Fleet and operations ==
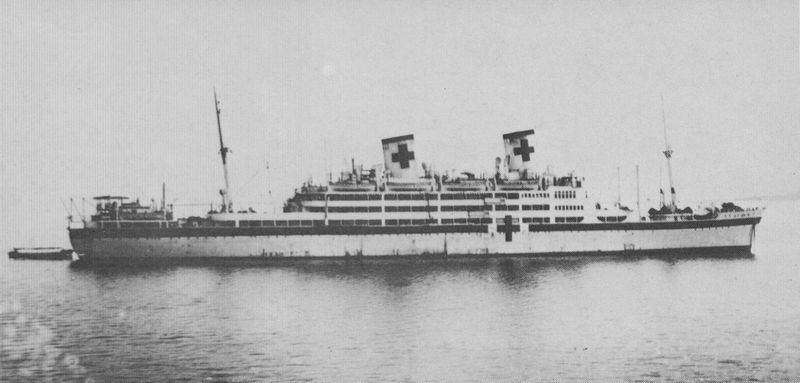
Japanese hospital ship Takasago Maru

At the end of the war Japan was acutely short of large passenger ships. Only two had survived hostilities: NYK Line's Hikawa Maru and OSK Line's Takasago Maru. Both had served as hospital ships and SCAJAP requisitioned them as transport ships.

On 7 December 1945 a conference was held at Tokyo as a result of which it was recommended that 100 Liberty ships, 100 LSTs and seven hospital ships be made available to SCAJAP for repatriation. The ships were to be converted in Japan to carry repatriates and were crewed by the Japanese.

Of the shipping requested, 106 Liberties and 100 LST's were received, but only 85 of the LST's were retained for repatriation, the other 15 LST's being used to support the economy of Korea. On arrival in Japan, under direction of SCAJAP, these ships were modified to carry passengers, provided with trained Japanese crews, and put in service at a rate of 25 a week. Six of the Liberties were converted into hospital ships of about 1,200 beds each. Since total available passenger capacity of these SCAJAP vessels was approximately 400,000 by the end of March 1946, all United States Seventh Fleet shipping was released from repatriation. Over 50 percent of the total Japanese repatriation fleet, with a capacity of 100,000 spaces supplemented US shipping.

== Temporary service of an active US ship ==
An example of the use of a commissioned US ship, such as USS Pembina being temporarily assigned to SCAJAP, can be found here.

== See also ==
- List of major U.S. Commands of World War II
