= USS LST-274 =

LST-1-class landing ship tank

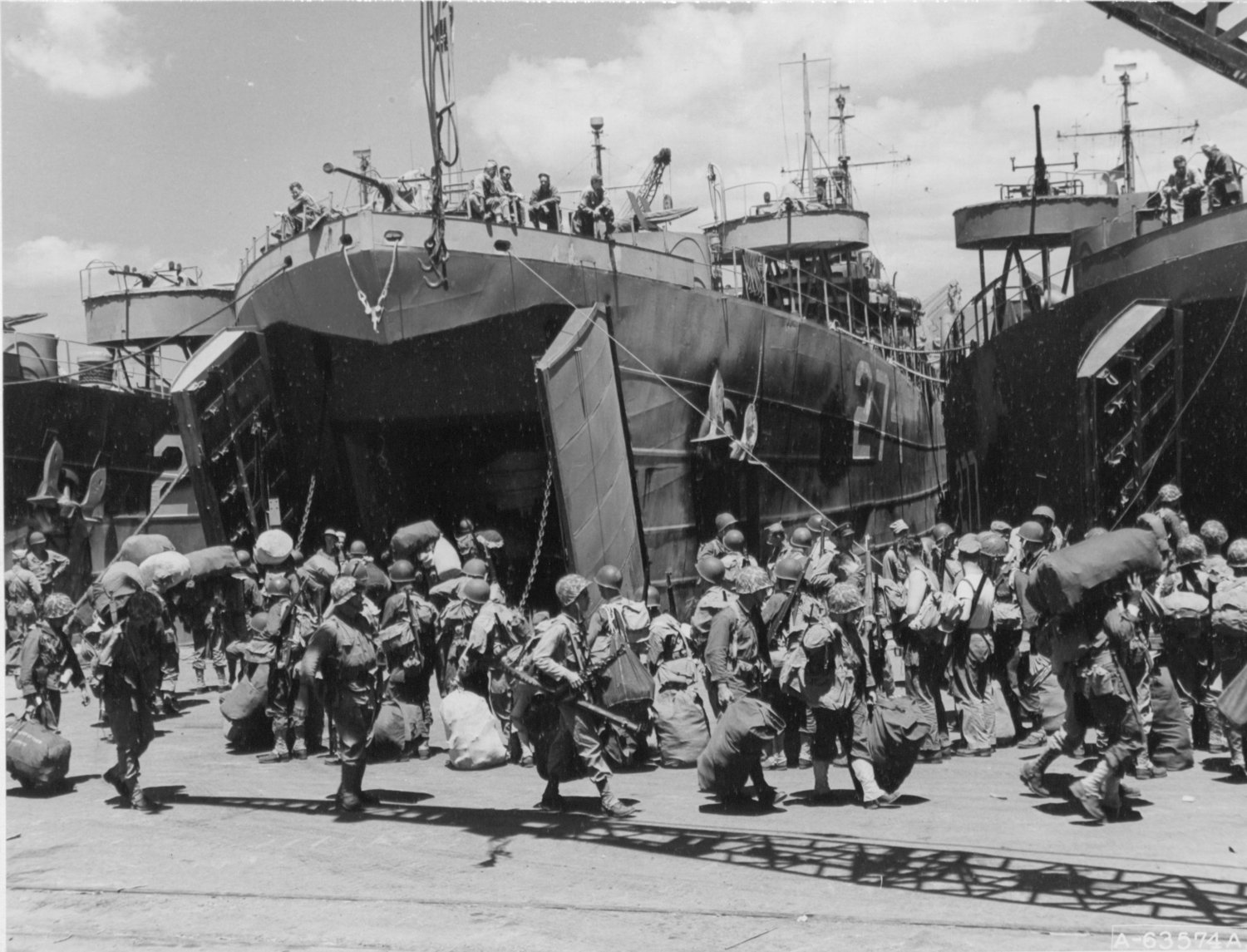
- USS LST-274 and USS LST-277 on 27 May 1944

History

United States
- Name: LST-274
- Builder: American Bridge Co., Ambridge
- Laid down: 11 March 1943
- Launched: 15 August 1943
- Sponsored by: Mrs. R. F. Salmon
- Commissioned: 28 September 1943
- Decommissioned: 6 May 1946
- Stricken: 23 June 1947
- Identification: Callsign: NWTY
- Honors and awards: See Awards
- Fate: Scrapped, 29 June 1948

General characteristics
- Class & type: LST-1-class tank landing ship
- Displacement: 4,080 long tons (4,145 t) full load; 2,160 long tons (2,190 t) landing
- Length: 328 ft (100 m) oa
- Beam: 50 ft (15 m)
- Draft: Full load: 8 ft 2 in (2.49 m) forward; 14 ft 1 in (4.29 m) aft; Landing at 2,160 t: 3 ft 11 in (1.19 m) forward; 9 ft 10 in (3.00 m) aft
- Installed power: 2 × 900 hp (670 kW) Electro-Motive Diesel 12-567A diesel engines; 1,700 shp (1,300 kW)
- Propulsion: 1 × Falk main reduction gears; 2 × Propellers
- Speed: 12 kn (22 km/h; 14 mph)
- Range: 24,000 nmi (44,000 km; 28,000 mi) at 9 kn (17 km/h; 10 mph) while displacing 3,960 long tons (4,024 t)
- Boats & landing craft carried: 2 or 6 x LCVPs
- Capacity: 2,100 tons oceangoing maximum; 350 tons main deckload
- Troops: 16 officers, 147 enlisted men
- Complement: 13 officers, 104 enlisted men
- Armament: Varied, ultimate armament; 2 × twin 40 mm (1.57 in) Bofors guns; 4 × single 40 mm Bofors guns; 12 × 20 mm (0.79 in) Oerlikon cannons

USS LST-274 was a LST-1-class tank landing ship in the United States Navy during World War II.

== Construction and career ==
LST-274 was laid down on 11 March 1943 at American Bridge Co., Seneca, Indiana. Launched on 15 August 1943 and commissioned on 28 September 1943.

She was present during the West Loch disaster and she was moored with LST-69, LST-225, LST-205, LST-43, LST-179, LST-353, and LST-39. No crew members were lost aboard the ship during that disaster.

During World War II, LST-274 was assigned to the Asiatic-Pacific theater. She took part in the Occupation of Kwajalein and Majuro Atolls, 31 January to 8 February 1944 and Battle of Saipan from 17 June to 3 July 1944.

LST-274 was decommissioned on 6 May 1946 and struck from the Navy Register on 23 June 1947.

On 29 June 1948, she was sold for scrap to Alexander Shipyard, Inc., New Orleans, Louisiana.

== Awards ==
LST-274 have earned the following awards:

- American Campaign Medal
- Asiatic-Pacific Campaign Medal (2 battle stars)
- World War II Victory Medal

== Sources ==
- United States. Dept. of the Treasury (1962). Treasury Decisions Under the Customs, Internal Revenue, Industrial Alcohol, Narcotic and Other Laws, Volume 97. U.S. Government Printing Office.
- Moore, Capt. John (1984). Jane's Fighting Ships 1984-85. Jane's Information Group. ISBN 978-0710607959.
- Saunders, Stephen (2009). Jane's Fighting Ships 2009-2010. Jane's Information Group. ISBN 978-0710628886.
- Fairplay International Shipping Journal Volume 222. United Kingdom: Fairplay Publishing Limited. 1967.
