= USS LST-225 =

LST-1-class landing ship tank

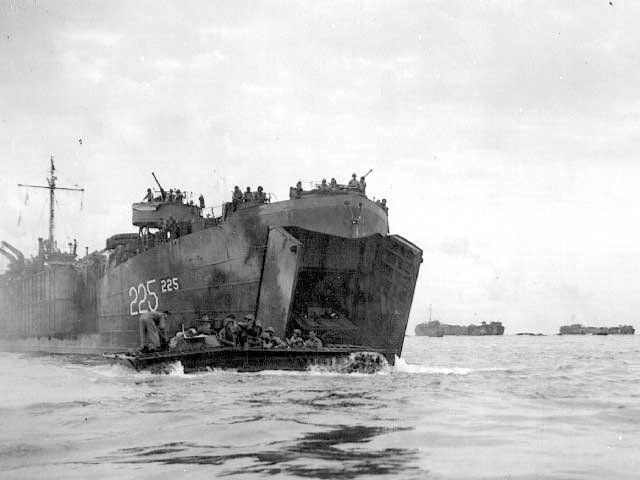
- USS LST-225 in Peleliu on 6 September 1944

History

United States
- Name: LST-225
- Builder: Chicago Bridge and Iron Co., Seneca
- Laid down: 14 April 1943
- Launched: 4 September 1943
- Sponsored by: Mrs. Mary Oklesen
- Commissioned: 2 October 1943
- Decommissioned: 30 July 1946
- Stricken: 28 August 1946
- Identification: Callsign: NYWZ
- Honors and awards: See Awards
- Fate: Scrapped, 16 December 1947

General characteristics
- Class & type: LST-1-class tank landing ship
- Displacement: 4,080 long tons (4,145 t) full load; 2,160 long tons (2,190 t) landing
- Length: 328 ft (100 m) oa
- Beam: 50 ft (15 m)
- Draft: Full load: 8 ft 2 in (2.49 m) forward; 14 ft 1 in (4.29 m) aft; Landing at 2,160 t: 3 ft 11 in (1.19 m) forward; 9 ft 10 in (3.00 m) aft
- Installed power: 2 × 900 hp (670 kW) Electro-Motive Diesel 12-567A diesel engines; 1,700 shp (1,300 kW)
- Propulsion: 1 × Falk main reduction gears; 2 × Propellers
- Speed: 12 kn (22 km/h; 14 mph)
- Range: 24,000 nmi (44,000 km; 28,000 mi) at 9 kn (17 km/h; 10 mph) while displacing 3,960 long tons (4,024 t)
- Boats & landing craft carried: 2 or 6 x LCVPs
- Capacity: 2,100 tons oceangoing maximum; 350 tons main deckload
- Troops: 16 officers, 147 enlisted men
- Complement: 13 officers, 104 enlisted men
- Armament: Varied, ultimate armament; 2 × twin 40 mm (1.57 in) Bofors guns; 4 × single 40 mm Bofors guns; 12 × 20 mm (0.79 in) Oerlikon cannons

USS LST-225 was a LST-1-class tank landing ship in the United States Navy during World War II.

== Construction and career ==
LST-225 was laid down on 14 April 1943 at Chicago Bridge and Iron Co., Seneca, Indiana. Launched on 4 September 1943 and commissioned on 2 October 1943.

She was present during the West Loch disaster and she was moored with LST-69, LST-205, LST-274, LST-43, LST-179, LST-353, and LST-39. No crew members were lost aboard the ship during that disaster.

During World War II, LST-225 was assigned to the Asiatic-Pacific theater. She took part in the Battle of Saipan from 17 June to 3 July 1944 and the Battle of Tinian from 24 to 28 July 1944.

The ship participated in the occupation of southern Palau Islands from 6 September to 14 October 1944.

LST-225 was decommissioned on 30 July 1946 and struck from the Navy Register on 28 August later that year.

On 16 December 1947, she was sold for scrap to Learner Company, Oakland, California.

== Awards ==
LST-225 have earned the following awards:

- American Campaign Medal
- Asiatic-Pacific Campaign Medal (3 battle stars)
- World War II Victory Medal
- Navy Occupation Service Medal (with Asia clasp)

== Sources ==
- United States. Dept. of the Treasury (1962). Treasury Decisions Under the Customs, Internal Revenue, Industrial Alcohol, Narcotic and Other Laws, Volume 97. U.S. Government Printing Office.
- Moore, Capt. John (1984). Jane's Fighting Ships 1984-85. Jane's Information Group. ISBN 978-0710607959.
- Saunders, Stephen (2009). Jane's Fighting Ships 2009-2010. Jane's Information Group. ISBN 978-0710628886.
- Fairplay International Shipping Journal Volume 222. United Kingdom: Fairplay Publishing Limited. 1967.
