= USS LST-205 =

LST-1-class landing ship tank

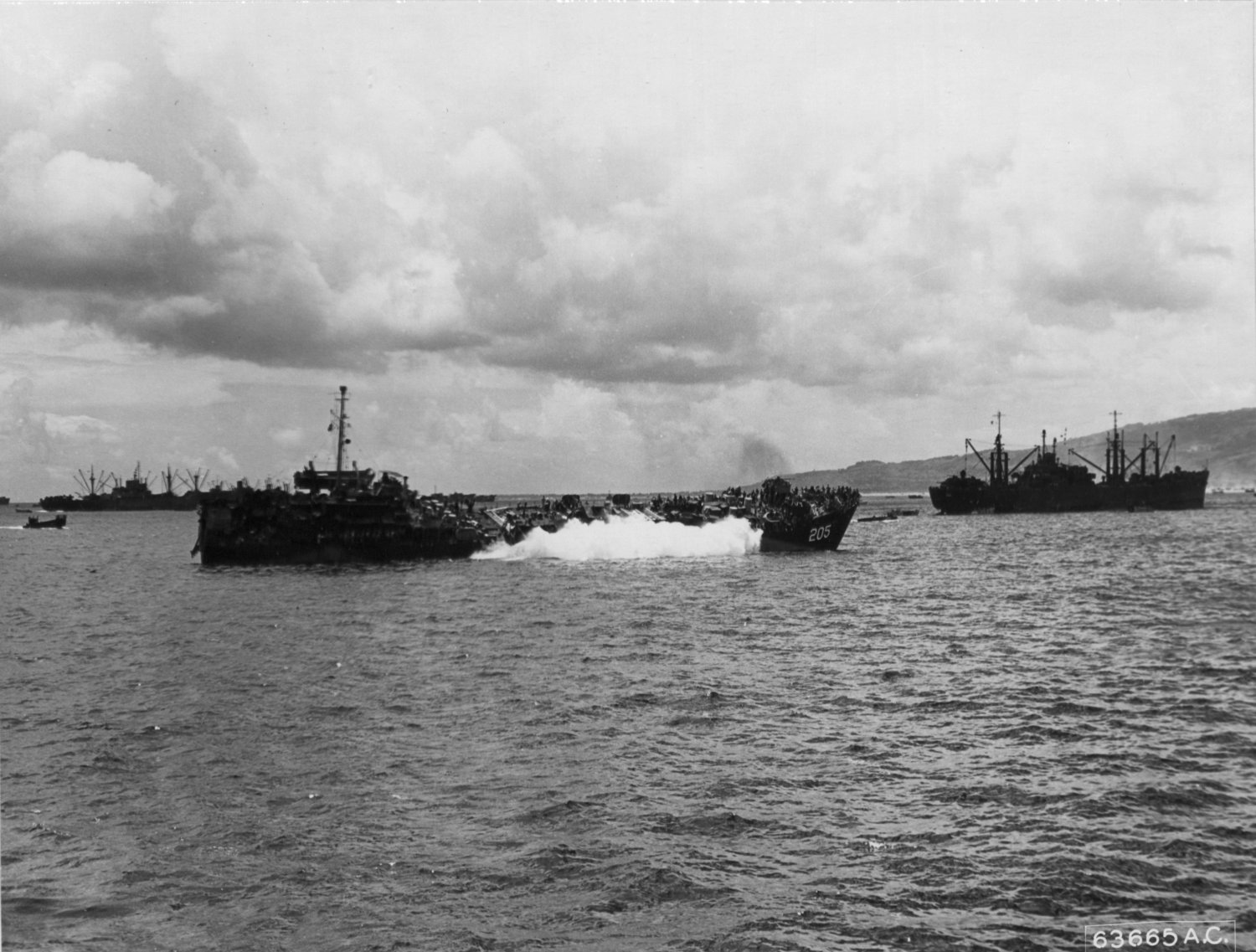
- USS LST-205 launching a LCT at Saipan on 20 June 1944

History

United States
- Name: LST-205
- Builder: Chicago Bridge and Iron Co., Seneca
- Laid down: 5 August 1942
- Launched: 13 April 1943
- Sponsored by: Mrs. Doris DeHaven
- Commissioned: 15 May 1943
- Decommissioned: 2 April 1946
- Reclassified: LST(H)-205, 15 September 1945
- Stricken: 5 June 1946
- Identification: Callsign: NZQB
- Honors and awards: See Awards
- Fate: Scrapped, 4 June 1948

General characteristics
- Class & type: LST-1-class tank landing ship
- Displacement: 4,080 long tons (4,145 t) full load; 2,160 long tons (2,190 t) landing
- Length: 328 ft (100 m) oa
- Beam: 50 ft (15 m)
- Draft: Full load: 8 ft 2 in (2.49 m) forward; 14 ft 1 in (4.29 m) aft; Landing at 2,160 t: 3 ft 11 in (1.19 m) forward; 9 ft 10 in (3.00 m) aft
- Installed power: 2 × 900 hp (670 kW) Electro-Motive Diesel 12-567A diesel engines; 1,700 shp (1,300 kW)
- Propulsion: 1 × Falk main reduction gears; 2 × Propellers
- Speed: 12 kn (22 km/h; 14 mph)
- Range: 24,000 nmi (44,000 km; 28,000 mi) at 9 kn (17 km/h; 10 mph) while displacing 3,960 long tons (4,024 t)
- Boats & landing craft carried: 2 or 6 x LCVPs
- Capacity: 2,100 tons oceangoing maximum; 350 tons main deckload
- Troops: 16 officers, 147 enlisted men
- Complement: 13 officers, 104 enlisted men
- Armament: Varied, ultimate armament; 2 × twin 40 mm (1.57 in) Bofors guns; 4 × single 40 mm Bofors guns; 12 × 20 mm (0.79 in) Oerlikon cannons

USS LST-205 was a LST-1-class tank landing ship in the United States Navy during World War II.

== Construction and career ==
LST-205 was laid down on 5 August 1942 at Chicago Bridge and Iron Co., Seneca, Indiana. Launched on 12 April 1943 and commissioned on 15 May 1943.

During World War II, LST-205 was assigned to the Asiatic-Pacific theater. She took part in the Gilbert Islands operations from 21 November to 8 December 1943.

She was present during the West Loch disaster and she was moored with LST-69, LST-225, LST-274, LST-43, LST-179, LST-353, and LST-39. No crew members were lost aboard the ship during that disaster. She was then sent to take part in the Battle of Biak Island from 9 to 13 June 1944. The ship again took part in the Battle of Saipan from 17 June to 3 July 1944 and the Leyte landings from 20 October and 19 to 29 November 1944.

On 15 September 1945, she was redesigned as a hospital tank landing ship.

LST-205 was decommissioned on 2 April 1946 and struck from the Navy Register on 5 June later that year.

On 4 June 1948, she was sold for scrap to Hughes Bros., Inc., New York City, New York.

== Gallery ==
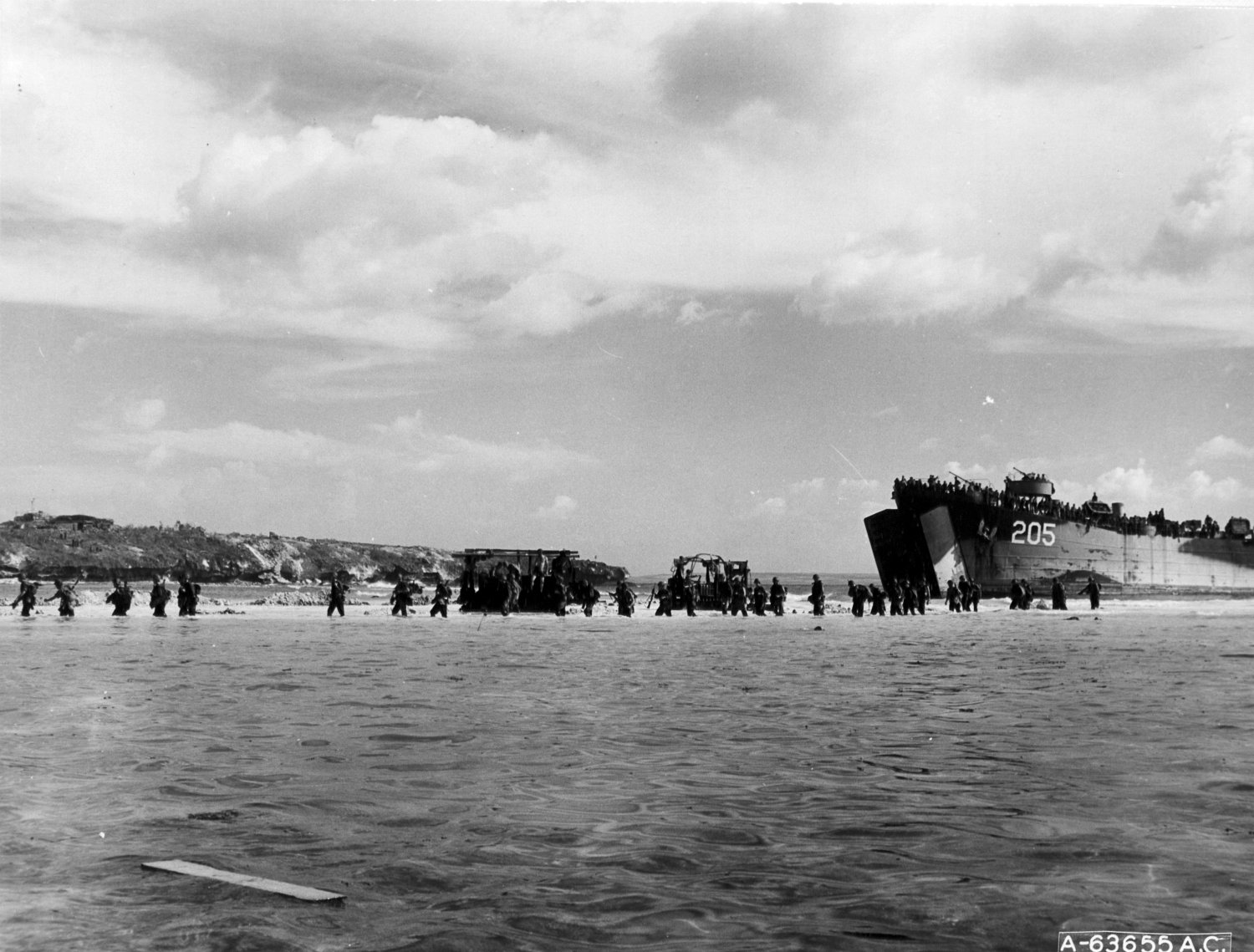
USS LST-205 during Battle of Saipan on 21 June 1944

== Awards ==
LST-205 have earned the following awards:

- China Service Medal
- American Campaign Medal
- Asiatic-Pacific Campaign Medal (4 battle stars)
- World War II Victory Medal
- Navy Occupation Service Medal (with Asia clasp)
- Philippines Presidential Unit Citation
- Philippine Liberation Medal (1 award)

== Sources ==
- United States. Dept. of the Treasury (1962). Treasury Decisions Under the Customs, Internal Revenue, Industrial Alcohol, Narcotic and Other Laws, Volume 97. U.S. Government Printing Office.
- Moore, Capt. John (1984). Jane's Fighting Ships 1984-85. Jane's Information Group. ISBN 978-0710607959.
- Saunders, Stephen (2009). Jane's Fighting Ships 2009-2010. Jane's Information Group. ISBN 978-0710628886.
- Fairplay International Shipping Journal Volume 222. United Kingdom: Fairplay Publishing Limited. 1967.
