= USS LST-19 =

1943 LST-1-class tank landing ship

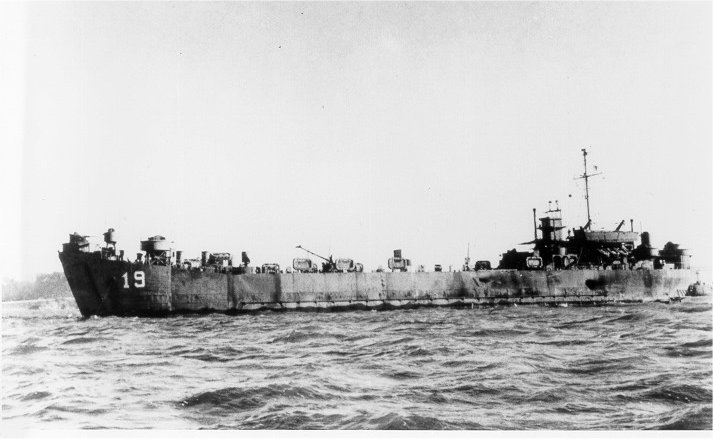
- USS LST-19 at anchor in San Francisco Bay, c. 1945–1946.

History

United States
- Name: LST-19
- Builder: Dravo Corporation, Pittsburgh, Pennsylvania
- Laid down: 22 October 1942
- Launched: 11 March 1943
- Commissioned: 15 May 1943
- Decommissioned: 20 March 1946
- Reclassified: Tank Landing Ship (Hospital), 15 September 1945
- Stricken: 1 May 1946
- Identification: Hull symbol: LST-19; Hull symbol: LST(H)-19; Code letters: NPNJ
- Honors and awards: 4 × battle stars
- Fate: Sold for scrapping, 5 December 1947

General characteristics
- Type: LST-1-class tank landing ship
- Displacement: 4,080 long tons (4,145 t) full load; 2,160 long tons (2,190 t) landing
- Length: 328 ft (100 m) oa
- Beam: 50 ft (15 m)
- Draft: Full load: 8 ft 2 in (2.49 m) forward; 14 ft 1 in (4.29 m) aft; Landing at 2,160 t: 3 ft 11 in (1.19 m) forward; 9 ft 10 in (3.00 m) aft
- Installed power: 2 × 900 hp (670 kW) Electro-Motive Diesel 12-567A diesel engines; 1,700 shp (1,300 kW)
- Propulsion: 1 × Falk main reduction gears; 2 × Propellers
- Speed: 12 kn (22 km/h; 14 mph)
- Range: 24,000 nmi (44,000 km; 28,000 mi) at 9 kn (17 km/h; 10 mph) while displacing 3,960 long tons (4,024 t)
- Boats & landing craft carried: 2 or 6 x LCVPs
- Capacity: 2,100 tons oceangoing maximum; 350 tons main deckload
- Troops: 16 officers, 147 enlisted men
- Complement: 13 officers, 104 enlisted men
- Armament: Varied, ultimate armament; 2 × twin 40 mm (1.57 in) Bofors guns; 4 × single 40 mm Bofors guns; 12 × 20 mm (0.79 in) Oerlikon cannons

Service record
- Part of: LST Flotilla 13
- Awards: American Campaign Medal; Asiatic–Pacific Campaign Medal; World War II Victory Medal; Navy Occupation Service Medal w/Asia Clasp

USS LST-19 was a United States Navy LST-1-class tank landing ship used exclusively in the Asiatic-Pacific Theater during World War II and manned by a United States Coast Guard crew. Like many of her class, she was not named and is properly referred to by her hull designation.

== Construction ==
LST-19 was laid down on 22 October 1942, at Pittsburgh, Pennsylvania by the Dravo Corporation; launched on 11 March 1943; sponsored by Mrs. Frances P. Gott. She was floated down the Ohio and Mississippi rivers and entered commissioned service on 15 May 1943.

== Service history ==
During World War II, LST-19 was assigned to the Asiatic-Pacific theater. From 1–17 July 1943, she was on the California coast en route to Alaska. She stopped at San Diego, Mare Island Navy Yard and San Francisco, loading cargo and LCT-81 on her top deck, and embarking Army personnel at the latter location. On 17 July 1943, she was underway out of San Francisco Bay, arriving at the Naval Air Station, Woman's Bay, Kodiak, Alaska on 25 July 1943. On 27 July, she was underway in convoy with three Navy escorts and in company with LST-20, LST-23, LST-69, LST-169, LST-205, and LST-479 for Adak Island in the Aleutians where she arrived on 1 August 1943. Here the Army personnel were disembarked and LCT-81 launched. Beaching exercises were carried out. Practice operations were continued, some in Great Sitkin Island area and cargo was unloaded at Sweeper's Cove. Departing Adak on 14 August 1943, LST-19 took position in a convoy operating with Task Force 16.10. On 16 August, she broke off and proceeded independently, anchoring off Kiska Island. She then entered Kiska Harbor on 19 August, and began unloading Army equipment. Getting underway on 19 August, in convoy with LST-69 and LCI-77, LCI-78, LCI-79, LCI-80, LCI-81, and LCI-82, escorted by Coghlan, she began proceeding independently on 22 August, and anchored at Adak Island. She departed for San Francisco, on 31 August 1943, but turned back to Adak due to engine problems.

LST-19 was at San Pedro, on 4 April 1944. Proceeding to San Diego and San Francisco, she departed for Pearl Harbor, on 3 May 1944. Proceeding by way of Saipan and Eniwetok LST-19 arrived at Peleliu on D-1 day, 14 September 1944, and was also engaged in the raids on Volocano-Bonia and Yap. She returned to Peleliu and Angaur on 24 December 1944. On 31 December, she was at Fais Island, returning to Peleliu on 15 January 1945. LST-19 arrived at Kossol, on 4 February 1945, and Ulithi on 11 February. She departed Ulithi, on 5 March, for San Francisco via Eniwetok, Pearl Harbor, San Pedro and San Diego, arriving on 28 July 1945. On 5 August 1945, she departed San Francisco for Pearl Harbor, returning on 3 September 1945.

LST-19 was redesignated as LST(H)-19 on 15 September 1945. Again departing San Francisco, on 25 September 1945, she proceeded to Wakayama, Japan, via Pearl Harbor and Buckner Bay, Okinawa, arriving there on 5 November 1945. She returned to San Francisco, in January 1946, via Saipan and Pearl Harbor. She then sailed for Charleston, South Carolina, via the Canal Zone, on 18 January 1946, arriving at Charleston on 14 February 1946.

== Post-war decommissioning ==
She was decommissioned and her Coast Guard crew removed on 20 March 1946. She was struck from the Navy List on 1 May 1946. On 5 December 1947, she was sold to Ships and Power Equipment Co., of Barber, New Jersey, for scrapping.

== Awards ==
LST-19 earned four battle stars for World War II service.

== See also ==
- Landing craft
- List of United States Navy LSTs

== Bibliography ==
- "LST-19". Dictionary of American Naval Fighting Ships. Naval History and Heritage Command. This article incorporates text from this source, which is in the public domain.
- "USS LST-19". NavSource. 4 April 2014.
- "USS LST-19" (PDF). United States Coast Guard. This article incorporates text from this source, which is in the public domain.
