= USS LST-340 =

North American warship

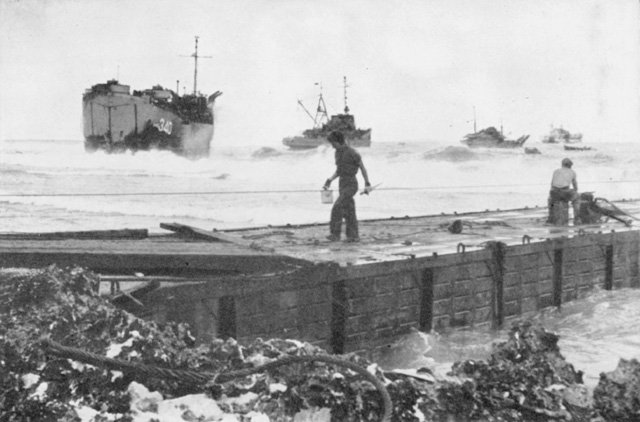
- USS LST-340 (USS Spark) stranded on "White Beach" c. July 1944

History

United States
- Name: USS Spark and USS LST-340
- Builder: Norfolk Navy Yard, Portsmouth, Virginia
- Laid down: 17 July 1942 as LST-340
- Launched: 8 November 1942
- Commissioned: 26 December 1942, as USS LST-340
- Decommissioned: 24 October 1944
- Renamed: Spark (IX-196), 20 October 1944
- Reclassified: as Miscellaneous Unclassified, 20 October 1944
- Stricken: 1 September 1945
- Honors and awards: 3 battle stars (World War II)
- Fate: Unknown

General characteristics
- Class & type: LST-1-class tank landing ship
- Tonnage: 1,625 long tons (1,651 t)
- Displacement: 4,080 long tons (4,145 t) full
- Length: 328 ft (100 m)
- Beam: 50 ft (15 m)
- Draft: 14 ft 1 in (4.29 m)
- Propulsion: 2 × General Motors 12-567 900 hp (671 kW) diesel engines, two shafts, twin rudders
- Speed: 11.6 knots (21.5 km/h; 13.3 mph)
- Endurance: 24,000 nmi (44,000 km) at 9 kn (17 km/h; 10 mph) while displacing 3960 tons
- Boats & landing craft carried: 2 LCVPs
- Capacity: between 1600 and 1900 tons
- Troops: 16 officers, 147 enlisted
- Complement: 7 officers, 104 enlisted
- Armament: 2 × twin 40 mm gun mounts w/Mk.51 directors; 4 × single 40 mm gun mounts; 12 × single 20 mm gun mounts

USS LST-340 - later known as USS Spark (IX-196) - was a LST-1-class tank landing ship that served with the U.S. Navy during World War II. LST-340 served in the Pacific theatre and, despite suffering severe damage from the enemy, was awarded three battle stars for her action in dangerous areas. She was declared too damaged to return to the United States, so she was then reassigned as a barracks ship at Saipan.

== Laid down in Virginia ==
The third ship to be so named by the Navy, Spark was laid down as LST-340 on 17 July 1942 by the Norfolk Navy Yard, Portsmouth, Virginia; launched on 8 November 1942; and commissioned on 26 December 1942.

== World War II service ==
=== Assigned to the Pacific theatre ===
LST-340 held her shakedown cruise in the Chesapeake Bay from 9 January to 3 February 1943 when she returned for a short yard period. She sailed to New York City on the 16th and departed there on 9 March in a convoy which called at Guantanamo Bay on the 16th and sailed the next day for the Panama Canal Zone. She arrived at Coco Solo on 21 March and transited the Panama Canal on the 28th. The LST remained at Balboa until 2 April when she got under way with 11 other LST's, comprising LST Flotilla 5, for the Society Islands. The flotilla arrived at Bora Bora on 24 April and headed for New Caledonia the following week.

=== Solomon Islands operations ===
LST-340 arrived at Noumea on 11 May and remained there until early June. She loaded army troops and sortied on 6 June with Task Group 32.3 for the Solomon Islands. The ship was off Kokum Beach, Guadalcanal, from 9 to 16 June.

=== Severely damaged by aircraft ===
At approximately 1350 hours on the 16th, she was attacked by nine Japanese dive bombers. Three of the planes attacked the ship immediately, dropping nine bombs in sticks of three. One plane that attacked from the port side registered two near misses with 300-pound bombs that landed about 50 feet off her starboard side and one direct hit on her main deck. Another attacked from the port bow, strafing the bow guns as it bored in and leaving over 100 holes in her port side.

The bomb explosion killed one gun crew member and nine Army passengers, wounded four sailors, and wreaked havoc with the ship itself. All communication and electrical systems were knocked out; much of the main deck was completely wrecked; the officer's quarters were gutted by fire; the galley was damaged beyond repair; there was burning fuel in the engine room; and there was no water with which to fight the fires. All troop passengers and all of the ship's complement, other than gun crews and repair parties, abandoned ship.

The LST was beached at Tenaru Beach, and the fires were brought under control four hours later with aid from LST-398. LST-340 was towed to Espiritu Santo for what repairs could be made. On 25 October, she sailed for California and a complete yard overhaul. The ship arrived at San Francisco, California, on 24 November 1943 and remained in the yard until April 1944.

=== Mariana Islands operations ===
Seaworthy again, LST-340 stood out of San Francisco on 25 April 1944 bound for Hawaii. She arrived at Maalaea Bay on 4 May and was assigned to the Northern Attack Force, Task Force 52, for the assault on the Mariana Islands.

The tank landing ship was moored at West Loch, Pearl Harbor, on 21 May, in the midst of other LST's that were loading ammunition for the invasion. At approximately 1505 hours, two LST's (LST-179 and LST-353), moored immediately ahead of LST-340, blew up. The 340 was underway and backing down within five minutes and, as she had lines to ships on either side, pulled them to safety as destruction spread among the closely moored ships. When the explosions ceased and the fires were extinguished, six LST's and three LCT's had been sunk with heavy casualties. Over 160 men had been killed, and almost 400 had been wounded.

=== Tinian operations ===
LST-340 was off Tinian during the assault on that island. On 21 June, she was unloading trucks and embarking wounded at White Beach #2. Heavy rains and high winds whipped the water, and the sea rolled in extremely heavy swells. When the ship attempted to retract from the beach, she was caught by the wind and swells and broached, suffering heavy damage.

There was a leak around the starboard shaft, which was five inches out of line; the auxiliary engine room was leaking and had two feet of water in it; the main engine room was flooded beyond control; six other compartments were ruptured; some compartments were holed through the bottom; the midships fresh water tanks were punctured; and the auxiliary engine room had a four-foot coral head protruding up through the bottom about 10 inches.

=== Conversion to barracks ship ===
The LST was refloated on 13 August and towed to Tanapag Harbor, Saipan. On 15 August, the ship was inspected and found to be damaged beyond repair. Plans were made to convert her into a barracks ship at Tanapag.

LST-340 was reclassified as IX-196 and named Spark on 20 October 1944.

== Post-war decommissioning ==
Spark was decommissioned on 24 October 1944 and struck from the Navy list on 1 September 1945.

== Awards ==
Spark received three battle stars for World War II service for her services in the Solomon Islands, Mariana Islands, and at Tinian.

== See also ==
- United States Navy
- World War II
