= USS LST-179 =

LST-1-class landing ship tank

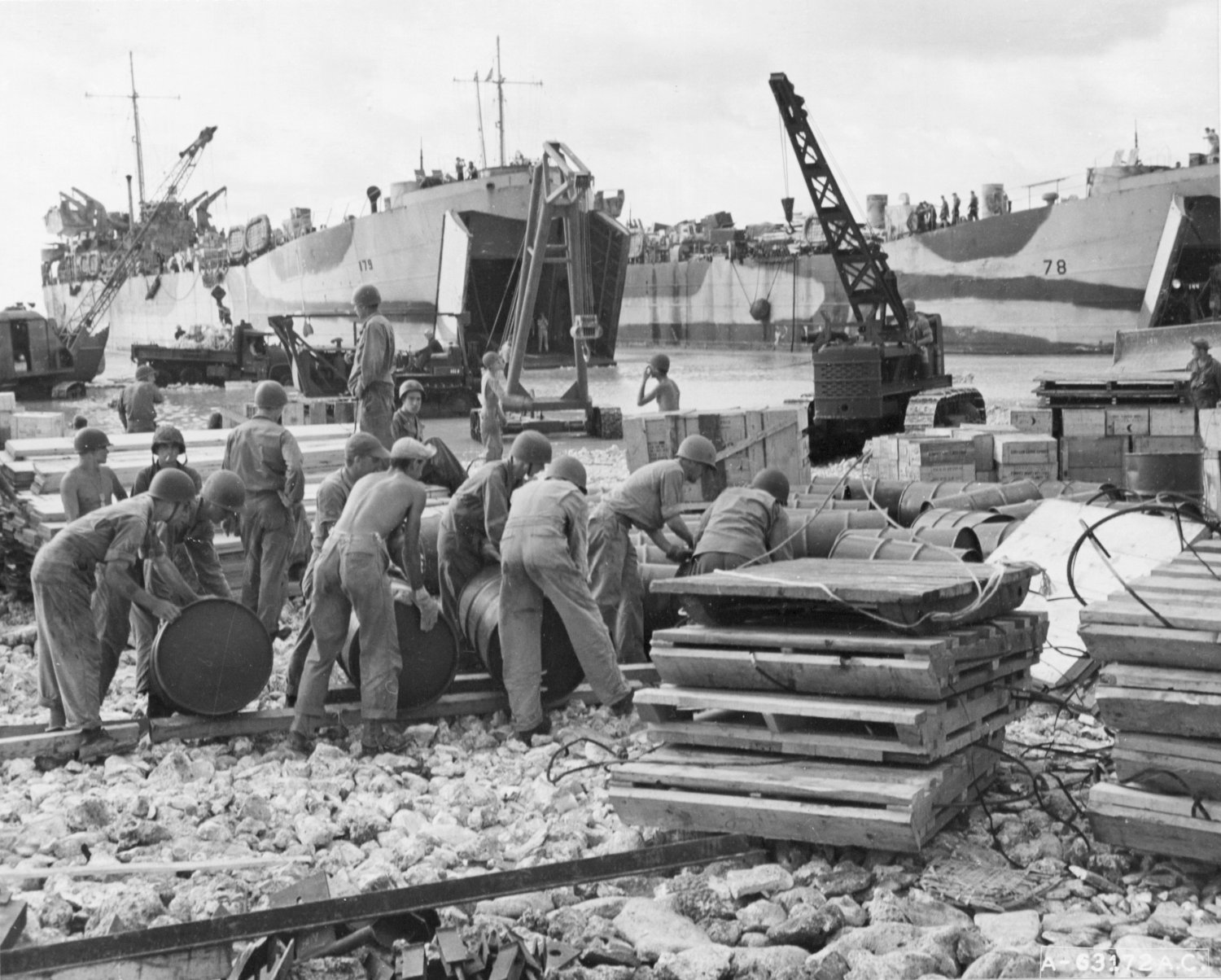
- USS LST-179 and USS LST-78 on 4 October 1943

History

United States
- Name: LST-179
- Builder: Missouri Valley Bridge and Iron Co., Evansville
- Laid down: 7 February 1943
- Launched: 30 May 1943
- Sponsored by: Mrs. Milford M. Miller
- Commissioned: 3 July 1943
- Stricken: 18 July 1944
- Identification: Callsign: NDPJ
- Honors and awards: See Awards
- Fate: Sunk as target, 1945

General characteristics
- Class & type: LST-1-class tank landing ship
- Displacement: 4,080 long tons (4,145 t) full load; 2,160 long tons (2,190 t) landing
- Length: 328 ft (100 m) oa
- Beam: 50 ft (15 m)
- Draft: Full load: 8 ft 2 in (2.49 m) forward; 14 ft 1 in (4.29 m) aft; Landing at 2,160 t: 3 ft 11 in (1.19 m) forward; 9 ft 10 in (3.00 m) aft
- Installed power: 2 × 900 hp (670 kW) Electro-Motive Diesel 12-567A diesel engines; 1,700 shp (1,300 kW)
- Propulsion: 1 × Falk main reduction gears; 2 × Propellers
- Speed: 12 kn (22 km/h; 14 mph)
- Range: 24,000 nmi (44,000 km; 28,000 mi) at 9 kn (17 km/h; 10 mph) while displacing 3,960 long tons (4,024 t)
- Boats & landing craft carried: 2 or 6 x LCVPs
- Capacity: 2,100 tons oceangoing maximum; 350 tons main deckload
- Troops: 16 officers, 147 enlisted men
- Complement: 13 officers, 104 enlisted men
- Armament: Varied, ultimate armament; 2 × twin 40 mm (1.57 in) Bofors guns; 4 × single 40 mm Bofors guns; 12 × 20 mm (0.79 in) Oerlikon cannons

USS LST-179 was a LST-1-class tank landing ship in the United States Navy during World War II.

== Construction and career ==
LST-179 was laid down on 7 February 1943 at Missouri Valley Bridge and Iron Co., Evansville, Indiana. Launched on 30 May 1943 and commissioned on 3 July 1943.

During World War II, LST-179 was assigned to the Asiatic-Pacific theater. She took part in the Gilbert Islands operations from 13 November to 8 December 1943.

She was destroyed and sunk during the West Loch disaster alongside 5 other LSTs at Pearl Harbor on 21 May 1944. On that day, she was moored with LST-205, LST-225, LST-274, LST-43, LST-69, LST-353, and LST-39. No crew members were lost aboard the ship during that disaster.

LST-179 was struck from the Navy Register on 18 July 1944.

In 1945, she was raised but deemed too expensive to be repaired thus she was towed out to sea and sunk again as a target ship for torpedoes.

== Awards ==
LST-179 have earned the following awards:

- American Campaign Medal
- Asiatic-Pacific Campaign Medal (1 battle star)
- World War II Victory Medal

== Sources ==
- United States. Dept. of the Treasury (1962). Treasury Decisions Under the Customs, Internal Revenue, Industrial Alcohol, Narcotic and Other Laws, Volume 97. U.S. Government Printing Office.
- Moore, Capt. John (1984). Jane's Fighting Ships 1984-85. Jane's Information Group. ISBN 978-0710607959.
- Saunders, Stephen (2009). Jane's Fighting Ships 2009-2010. Jane's Information Group. ISBN 978-0710628886.
- Fairplay International Shipping Journal Volume 222. United Kingdom: Fairplay Publishing Limited. 1967.
