= USCGC Woodbine =

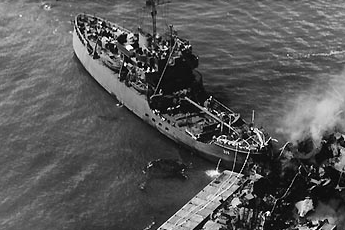
- Woodbine alongside the burned out hulk of USS LST-480 on 22 May 1944, the day after the West Loch Disaster

History

United States
- Name: USCGC Woodbine (WLB-289)
- Namesake: Woodbine (plant)
- Builder: Zenith Dredge Company, Duluth, Minnesota
- Cost: $1,156,000
- Laid down: 2 February 1942
- Launched: 3 July 1942
- Commissioned: 17 November 1942
- Decommissioned: 15 February 1972
- Reclassified: WLB-289, 1965
- Identification: IMO number: 8884490
- Fate: Donated to Cleveland Public School System, 19 June 1972, sold, scrapped August 2008

General characteristics
- Type: USCG seagoing buoy tender
- Displacement: 1,025 long tons (1,041 t) (1966)
- Length: 180 ft (55 m)
- Beam: 37 ft (11 m)
- Draft: 13 ft (4.0 m) (1966)
- Installed power: 2 × Westinghouse generators; 2 × Cooper Bessemer-type diesel engines
- Propulsion: 1 × electric motor 1,000 shp (746 kW); Single propeller
- Speed: 12 knots (22 km/h; 14 mph)
- Range: 11,000 nmi (20,000 km; 13,000 mi) at 10 knots (19 km/h; 12 mph) (1942)
- Complement: 53 (1966)
- Armament: Small arms only
- Notes: 20-ton boom with electric hoist

USCGC Woodbine (WAGL-289/WLB-289) was a United States Coast Guard buoy tender.

The ship, a 180 feet (55 m) Cactus- or A-class tender, was built in Duluth, Minnesota by the Zenith Dredge Company, laid down on 2 February 1942, launched on 3 July 1942, and commissioned on 17 November 1942, as Woodbine (WAGL-289).

== Service history ==
=== Atlantic coast, 1942–1944 ===
Woodbine was assigned to Norfolk, Virginia for general aids-to-navigation (ATON) duties, but did not arrive at her post until 5 February 1943, being delayed by several unscheduled ice-breaking operations.

On 20 September 1943, she was transferred to San Juan, Puerto Rico for aids-to-navigation and law enforcement duties, inspecting vessels suspected of drug trafficking.

=== World War II, 1944–1945 ===
On 15 January 1944, she sailed from Puerto Rico to Portsmouth Navy Yard for refitting, then sailed to San Francisco, where she was stationed from 7 March 1944. Woodbine was then deployed to the Pacific Theater of Operations to take part in the amphibious assault on the Marianas Islands, and served as a mobile service base for the U.S. Navy's Southern Attack force during the attack on Guam, before taking part in the Okinawa campaign in 1945.

=== Lake Michigan, 1947–1972 ===
At the end of the war Woodbine returned to the United States, and from 19 September 1947, was stationed in Grand Haven, Michigan, where she remained for the rest of her career.

On 19 April 1965 she was slightly damaged in a collision with MV Meteor while ice-breaking off Green Bay, Wisconsin. I was a seaman aboard the Woodbine when we had the collision. It was a Sunday afternoon around 3:00 pm.

From 18 to 20 August 1965, she was involved in recovering debris from United Airlines Flight 389 which had crashed into Lake Michigan. Also in 1965 her designation was changed from WAGL denoting an auxiliary vessel, lighthouse tender) to WLB.

On 6 January 1971, she was deployed to search for the crew of an Air Force B-52 bomber that crashed in upper Lake Michigan, near Charlevoix. There were no survivors.

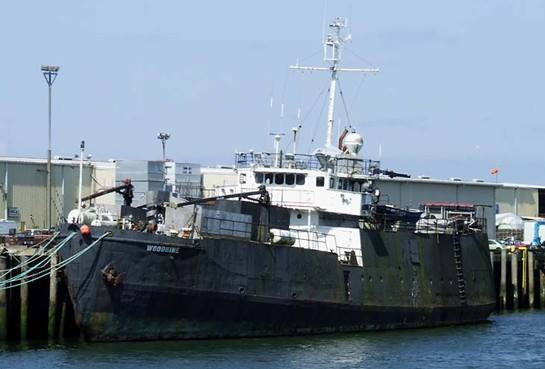
last photo

=== 1972–2012 ===
On 15 February 1972, as part of a government-wide savings plan, Woodbine was decommissioned and donated to the Cleveland Public School System through the Department of Health, Education, and Welfare/CSA to be used as a training ship in marine engineering and electronics. In the early 1980s, she was sold to a private owner at the cost of $150,000.

In the early 1980s, Woodbine was modified and used as a mobile fish processing ship in Alaska for the Woodbine Alaska Fishing Company (WAFCO), where she was working around 2007. The buoy deck was enclosed and used as a processing floor with 4 large freezers. On the stern a galley was built and the whole deck aft of the wheelhouse was enclosed to shelter the cardboard used to pack frozen fish in. The forward deck was outfitted with multiple holding tanks for fish waiting to be processed. In the spring of 1984 she suffered an engine room fire when an oiler left a container of solvent open on the grid deck above the main propulsion panel in the image. The fire was limited to about 1/3 of the panel. She was dead in the water off Eureka California for several days while coastguard stood by, and we made repairs. The fire caused overheating in the propulsion generators and a couple hundred pounds of solder had to be melted back into the armatures. Also, a couple miles of wire needed to be redone in the panel.

Woodbine was scrapped in August 2008.
