= USS LST-23 =

1943 LST-1-class tank landing ship

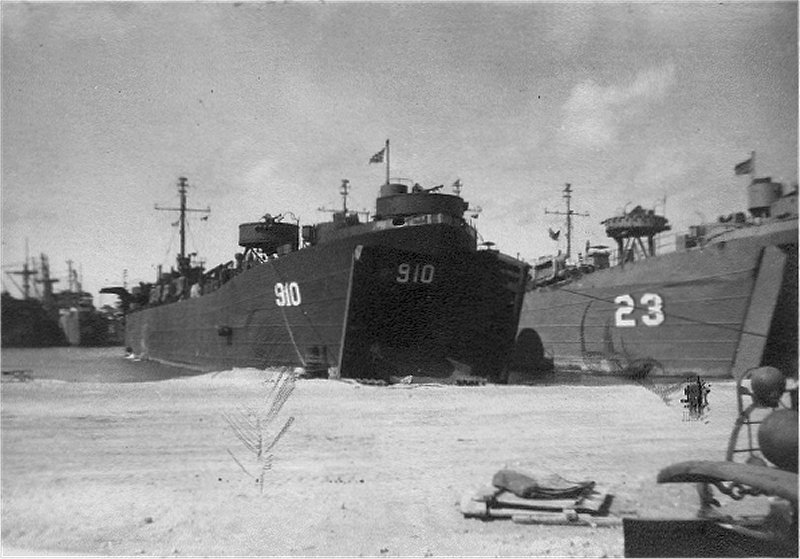
- USS LST-23 and LST-910, beached in the Philippines, circa 1944.

History

United States
- Name: LST-23
- Builder: Dravo Corporation, Pittsburgh, Pennsylvania
- Laid down: 27 October 1942
- Launched: 13 March 1943
- Sponsored by: Mrs. Mary H. Miller
- Commissioned: 22 May 1943
- Decommissioned: 24 May 1946
- Reclassified: Tank Landing Ship (Hospital), 15 September 1945
- Stricken: 3 July 1946
- Identification: Hull symbol: LST-23; Hull symbol: LST(H)-23; Code letters: NYPD
- Honors and awards: 6 × battle stars
- Fate: Sold for scrapping, 6 April 1948

General characteristics
- Type: LST-1-class tank landing ship
- Displacement: 4,080 long tons (4,145 t) full load; 2,160 long tons (2,190 t) landing
- Length: 328 ft (100 m) oa
- Beam: 50 ft (15 m)
- Draft: Full load: 8 ft 2 in (2.49 m) forward; 14 ft 1 in (4.29 m) aft; Landing at 2,160 t: 3 ft 11 in (1.19 m) forward; 9 ft 10 in (3.00 m) aft
- Installed power: 2 × 900 hp (670 kW) Electro-Motive Diesel 12-567A diesel engines; 1,700 shp (1,300 kW)
- Propulsion: 1 × Falk main reduction gears; 2 × Propellers
- Speed: 12 kn (22 km/h; 14 mph)
- Range: 24,000 nmi (44,000 km; 28,000 mi) at 9 kn (17 km/h; 10 mph) while displacing 3,960 long tons (4,024 t)
- Boats & landing craft carried: 2 or 6 x LCVPs
- Capacity: 2,100 tons oceangoing maximum; 350 tons main deckload
- Troops: 16 officers, 147 enlisted men
- Complement: 13 officers, 104 enlisted men
- Armament: Varied, ultimate armament; 2 × twin 40 mm (1.57 in) Bofors guns; 4 × single 40 mm Bofors guns; 12 × 20 mm (0.79 in) Oerlikon cannons

Service record
- Part of: LST Flotilla 13
- Operations: Gilbert Islands operation (21 November–5 December 1943); Occupation of Kwajalein and Majuro Atolls (2–8 February 1944); Battle of Saipan (18 June–28 July 1944); Battle of Tinian (24–28 July 1944); Battle of Peleliu (9 September–14 October 1944); Battle of Luzon Lingayen Gulf landings (9 January 1945)
- Awards: American Campaign Medal; Asiatic–Pacific Campaign Medal; World War II Victory Medal; Navy Occupation Service Medal w/Asia Clasp; Philippine Liberation Medal

USS LST-23 was a United States Navy LST-1-class tank landing ship used exclusively in the Asiatic-Pacific Theater during World War II and staffed by a United States Coast Guard crew. Like many of her class, she was not named and is properly referred to by her hull designation.

== Construction ==
LST-23 was laid down on 27 October 1942, at Pittsburgh, Pennsylvania, by the Dravo Corporation; launched on 29 March 1943; sponsored by Mrs. Mary H. Miller. She was floated down the Ohio and Mississippi rivers to the Naval Section Base, Algiers, Louisiana, in March 1943. She was commissioned on 22 May 1943.

== Service history ==
On 10 June 1943, she departed Algiers, in convoy for San Francisco, via the Panama Canal. She arrived at San Diego on 1 July 1943, and at [[Mare Island Navy Yard]] on 3 July 1943. She left San Francisco, on 17 July 1943, with the destroyer Hutchins escorting her and five other LSTs for Alaskan waters. They arrived safely at the Naval Air Station, Woman's Bay, Kodiak, Alaska on 25 July 1943. The convoy and escort departed on 27 July, with an additional LST and two more escorts for Kuluk Harbor, Adak, Aleutian Islands, arriving there on 1 August 1943. Here she disembarked troops and equipment and beached to unload Army equipment. With two escorts and three other LSTs and a Navy tug she departed Kiska, on 27 August 1943, for Kuluk Harbor, Adak. On 31 August, LST-23 and five other LSTs departed Adak for San Francisco with two escorts, one of which left the group to escort LST-19, which was suffering engine trouble, back to Adak Island.

LST-23 participated in the Gilbert Islands operation from the end of November until the beginning of December 1943 and the occupation of Kwajalein and Majuro Atolls at the beginning of February 1944.

On 4 April 1944, she was in the Marshall Islands en route to Pearl Harbor which she reached on 24 April, remaining there until 15 June 1944. On 23 May 1944, the officers and men were recommended for consideration for awards for bravery and meritorious performance of duty. LST-23 moved to the Marianas next so she could take part in the Battle of Saipan from mid June until the end of July 1944, along with the Battle of Tinian at the end of July 1944. She proceeding to Eniwetok on 3 July 1944. From around the middle of September until the middle of October she participated in the Battle of Peleliu. On 12 October 1944, she was at Espiritu Santo.

On 16 October 1944, her medical officer, Lieutenant junior grade A. R. M. Sears, USNR, wrote to the Force Surgeon of the South Pacific Area regarding the morale on board LST-23 and it provides a unique insight into life aboard a Coast Guard-staffed LST in the Pacific during this point in the war:

1. The morale of the personnel of this vessel is suffering considerable hardship and measures to remedy the situation have failed thus far. The men most affected are those aboard who have been on constant duty on this vessel since before it went into commission in May 1943. However, there are other men aboard who have been overseas up to twenty seven months and they likewise are suffering.

2. The present medical officer has been aboard in excess of four months and has been able to observe the various officers and members of the crew and to evaluate their mental condition. Some of these men have grown so irritable that they are easily excited and often are called before Captain's Mast for acts committed because of the irritability acquired from their prolonged service aboard this ship. One signalman in particular had his rate taken away from him for an act against a senior petty officer, the whole of which, it is believed, arose from the irritability and mental fatigue from their long tour of duty.

3. These men do not have opportunity for liberty for long periods of time and seeing the same faces month after month, being unable to move in more than the small confines of the ship, has made many of them tired of each other, even suspicious and afraid of one another.

4. The ship has participated in action with the enemy and has been in extreme danger on numerous occasions. Some of its personnel have been wounded by enemy action. Many of the original members of the crew as well as some of those more recently assigned have developed extreme nervousness under danger due to their repeated subjection to shellfire and nearness to explosions of bombs with no means of protection other than the projectiles from their own guns.

5. This vessel is a U.S. Navy ship staffed by U.S. Coast Guard personnel which seems to make it difficult to obtain replacement personnel. The morale of the ship falls even lower when in port for the men find that Navy ships of the same class are sending men back to the states for leave and reassignment after eighteen months, twelve months, and even shorter periods.

6. We are hopeful that the Force Surgeon may be able to take some action which will result in the relief of the immediate situation and also establish some means by which personnel may be replaced after the specified eighteen months of sea duty in order to prevent any more permanent damage to the minds and morale of these men.

LT Sears letter did indeed stimulate some action. A 26 October 1944, memo to the Commandant (P), noted that 29 enlisted men were sent to LST-23 to relieve an equal number of her crew. Three officers were also sent as relief.

On 5 December 1944, while returning from a supply trip, LST-23, while in North Surigao Straits, was hit a glancing blow by a plane causing a fire and extensive damage. After being repaired LST-23 moved to the Philippines to finish out her combat career participating in General Douglas MacArthur's promised liberation of the islands from the Japanese occupation in the Battle of Luzon Lingayen Gulf landings on 9 January 1945, after which she returned to San Diego, California. Departing San Diego on 17 February 1945, she proceeded to Guam via Pearl Harbor, arriving there on 2 April 1945, and returning to San Francisco on 6 May 1945.

== Postwar career ==
Her next trip took her to Sasebo, Japan. Leaving Pearl Harbor on 3 September 1945, after the end of the war, she arrived in Sasebo. On 15 September 1945, she was redesignated Landing Ship, Tank (Hospital), LST(H). She departed Sasebo on 28 September for Lingayen and Manila. She left Manila on 10 October for Wakayama, Japan, via Lingayen, arriving there on 22 October. She returned to San Francisco on 2 February 1946, via Okinawa, Sasebo, Saipan, and Pearl Harbor. When she returned to the United States and was decommissioned on 24 May 1946. She was struck from the Navy list on 3 July 1946 and was sold to the Kaiser Company, Inc., Seattle, Washington, on 6 April 1948 for scrapping.

== Awards ==
LST-23 earned six battle stars for her World War II service.

== Bibliography ==
- "LST-23". Dictionary of American Naval Fighting Ships. Naval History and Heritage Command. 4 August 2015. This article incorporates text from this source, which is in the public domain.
- "USS LST-23". NavSource. 7 April 2017.
- "USS LST-23" (PDF). United States Coast Guard. This article incorporates text from this source, which is in the public domain.
