= USS Osceola (YT-129) =

Tugboat of the United States Navy

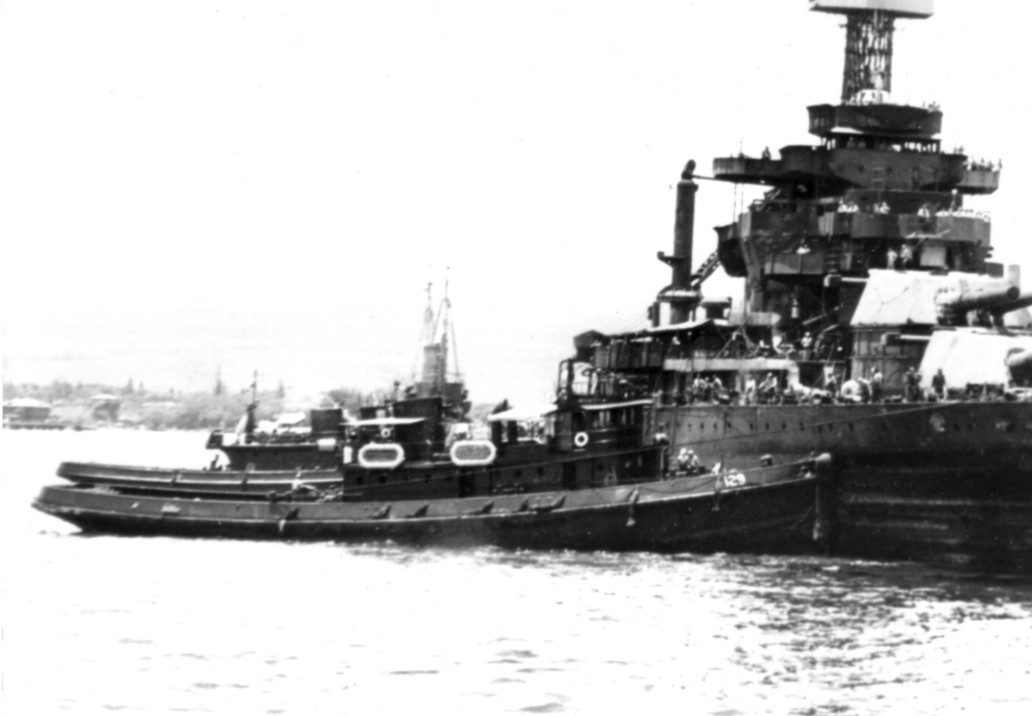
- USS Osceola (YT-129) assisting a battleship at Pearl Harbor, Hawaii

History

United States
- Name: USS Osceola
- Namesake: Osceola (1804-1838), a noted Seminole chief and leader during the Second Seminole War (1835-1842)
- Builder: Charleston Navy Yard
- Launched: 3 March 1938
- Commissioned: 1 June 1938
- Renamed: USS Osceola 17 September 1938 (previously had been USS YT-129)
- Reclassified: Large harbor tug YTB-129 12 April 1944; Medium harbor tug YTM-129 early 1962
- Fate: Sold for scrapping 1 February 1973

General characteristics
- Type: Harbor tug
- Displacement: 890 tons
- Length: 124 ft 9 in (38.02 m)
- Beam: 28 ft 0 in (8.53 m)
- Draft: 14 ft 0 in (4.27 m)

The third USS Osceola (YT-129), previously USS YT-129, later YTB-129, later YTM-129, was a United States Navy harbor tug commissioned in 1938 and sold for scrapping in 1973.

Harbor tug USS YT-129 was launched by the Charleston Navy Yard on 3 March 1938 and commissioned on 1 June 1938. She was assigned the name USS Osceola (YT-129) on 17 September 1938.

Osceola reported to the 14th Naval District, headquartered at Pearl Harbor, Hawaii and was stationed at Pearl Harbor throughout World War II. She was reclassified as a large harbor tug (YTB–129) on 12 April 1944 and was damaged during the West Loch Disaster of 21 May 1944. Her classification changed to medium harbor tug (YTM–129) in early 1962.

Osceola was sold for scrapping by the Defense Reutilization and Marketing Service (DRMS) on 1 February 1973.
