= USS LST-277 =

LST-1-class landing ship tank

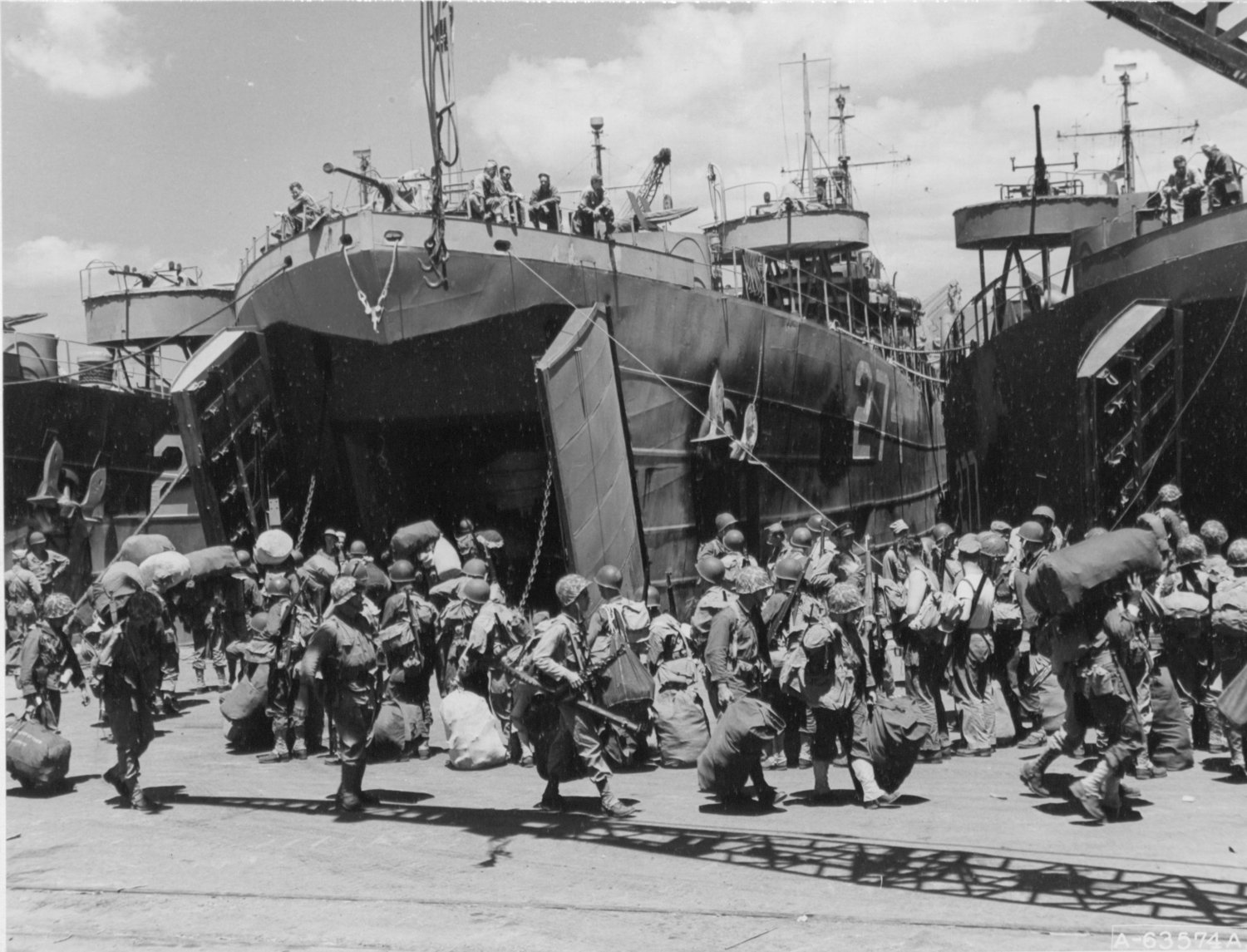
- USS LST-277 and USS LST-274 on 27 May 1944

History

United States
- Name: LST-277
- Builder: American Bridge Co., Ambridge
- Laid down: 31 May 1943
- Launched: 5 September 1943
- Sponsored by: Mrs. W. D. Guernsey
- Commissioned: 24 October 1943
- Decommissioned: 12 February 1946
- Renamed: Q055, 20 May 1949
- Recommissioned: 31 March 1952
- Renamed: T-LST-277
- Decommissioned: 1 February 1973
- Stricken: 1 February 1973
- Identification: Callsign: NZHO
- Honors and awards: See Awards
- Fate: Transferred to Chile, 2 February 1973

History

Chile
- Name: Commandante Toro
- Namesake: Commandante Toro
- Commissioned: 2 February 1973
- Decommissioned: 1977
- Identification: Pennant number: LST-97
- Fate: Scrapped, December 1977

General characteristics
- Class & type: LST-1-class tank landing ship
- Displacement: 4,080 long tons (4,145 t) full load; 2,160 long tons (2,190 t) landing
- Length: 328 ft (100 m) oa
- Beam: 50 ft (15 m)
- Draft: Full load: 8 ft 2 in (2.49 m) forward; 14 ft 1 in (4.29 m) aft; Landing at 2,160 t: 3 ft 11 in (1.19 m) forward; 9 ft 10 in (3.00 m) aft
- Installed power: 2 × 900 hp (670 kW) Electro-Motive Diesel 12-567A diesel engines; 1,700 shp (1,300 kW)
- Propulsion: 1 × Falk main reduction gears; 2 × Propellers
- Speed: 12 kn (22 km/h; 14 mph)
- Range: 24,000 nmi (44,000 km; 28,000 mi) at 9 kn (17 km/h; 10 mph) while displacing 3,960 long tons (4,024 t)
- Boats & landing craft carried: 2 or 6 x LCVPs
- Capacity: 2,100 tons oceangoing maximum; 350 tons main deckload
- Troops: 16 officers, 147 enlisted men
- Complement: 13 officers, 104 enlisted men
- Armament: Varied, ultimate armament; 2 × twin 40 mm (1.57 in) Bofors guns; 4 × single 40 mm Bofors guns; 12 × 20 mm (0.79 in) Oerlikon cannons

USS LST-277 was a LST-1-class tank landing ship in the United States Navy during World War II. She was later sold to Chile as Commandante Toro (LST-97).

== Construction and career ==
LST-277 was laid down on 31 May 1943 at American Bridge Co., Seneca, Indiana. Launched on 5 September 1943 and commissioned on 24 October 1943.

=== Service in the United States ===
During World War II, LST-277 was assigned to the Asiatic-Pacific theater. She took part in the Occupation of Kwajalein and Majuro Atolls from 1 to 5 February 1944 and Battle of Saipan from 17 to 24 June 1944. She was also present during the Leyte landings on 20 October 1944.

the ship participate in the Nasugbu landing on 31 January 1945 and the Battle of Okinawa from 25 March to 24 June 1945.

LST-277 was decommissioned on 12 February 1946.

On 20 May 1949, the ship was assigned to Commander Naval Forces Far East (COMNAVFE) Shipping Control Authority for Japan (SCAJAP) and renamed Q055.

Military Sea Transportation Service acquired the ship on 31 March 1952 and renamed T-LST-277.

She was decommissioned again and struck from the Navy Register on 1 February 1973.

=== Service in Chile ===
She was transferred to the Chilean Navy and commissioned on 2 February 1973 with the name Commandante Toro (LST-97).

The ship was out of service in 1977 and sold for scrap later in December.

== Awards ==
LST-277 have earned the following awards:

- American Campaign Medal
- Asiatic-Pacific Campaign Medal (5 battle stars)
- World War II Victory Medal
- Navy Occupation Service Medal (with Asia clasp)
- Philippines Presidential Unit Citation
- Philippines Liberation Medal (1 award)

== Sources ==
- United States. Dept. of the Treasury (1962). Treasury Decisions Under the Customs, Internal Revenue, Industrial Alcohol, Narcotic and Other Laws, Volume 97. U.S. Government Printing Office.
- Moore, Capt. John (1984). Jane's Fighting Ships 1984-85. Jane's Information Group. ISBN 978-0710607959.
- Saunders, Stephen (2009). Jane's Fighting Ships 2009-2010. Jane's Information Group. ISBN 978-0710628886.
- Fairplay International Shipping Journal Volume 222. United Kingdom: Fairplay Publishing Limited. 1967.
