= USS LST-461 =

1942 LST-1-class tank landing ship

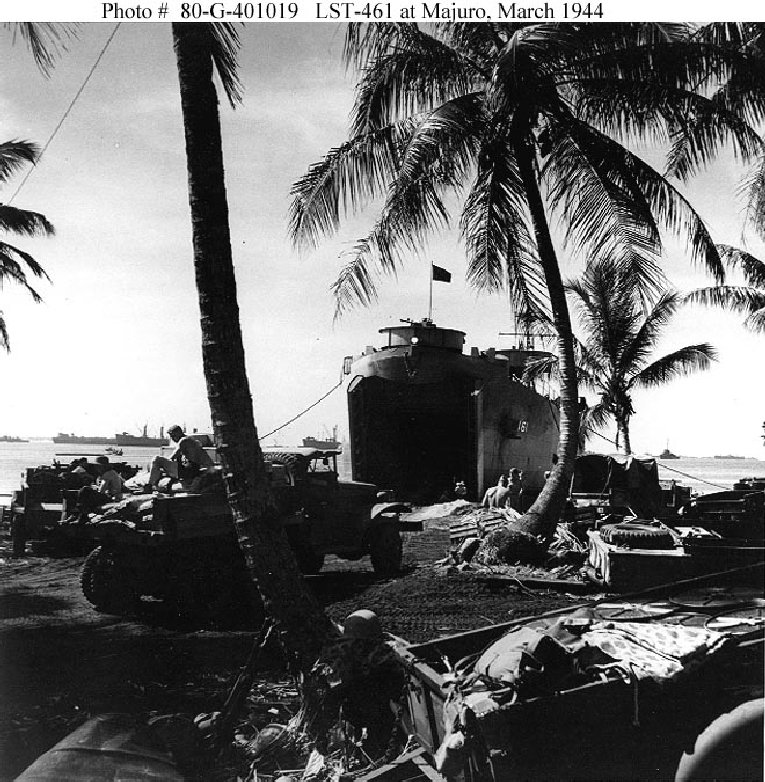
- USS LST-461, beached at Majuro Atoll in March 1944.

History

United States
- Name: LST-461
- Ordered: as a Type S3-M-K2 hull, MCE hull 981
- Builder: Kaiser Shipbuilding Company, Vancouver, Washington
- Yard number: 165
- Laid down: 30 September 1942
- Launched: 3 November 1942
- Commissioned: 18 February 1943
- Decommissioned: 2 September 1947
- Stricken: 16 September 1947
- Identification: Hull symbol: LST-461; Code letters: NPQJ
- Honors and awards: 6 × battle stars
- Fate: Sold for scrapping, 30 March 1948

General characteristics
- Class & type: LST-1-class tank landing ship
- Displacement: 4,080 long tons (4,145 t) full load; 2,160 long tons (2,190 t) landing
- Length: 328 ft (100 m) oa
- Beam: 50 ft (15 m)
- Draft: Full load: 8 ft 2 in (2.49 m) forward; 14 ft 1 in (4.29 m) aft; Landing at 2,160 t: 3 ft 11 in (1.19 m) forward; 9 ft 10 in (3.00 m) aft
- Installed power: 2 × 900 hp (670 kW) Electro-Motive Diesel 12-567A diesel engines; 1,700 shp (1,300 kW)
- Propulsion: 1 × Falk main reduction gears; 2 × Propellers
- Speed: 12 kn (22 km/h; 14 mph)
- Range: 24,000 nmi (44,000 km; 28,000 mi) at 9 kn (17 km/h; 10 mph) while displacing 3,960 long tons (4,024 t)
- Boats & landing craft carried: 2 or 6 x LCVPs
- Capacity: 2,100 tons oceangoing maximum; 350 tons main deckload
- Troops: 16 officers, 147 enlisted men
- Complement: 13 officers, 104 enlisted men
- Armament: Varied, ultimate armament; 2 × twin 40 mm (1.57 in) Bofors guns; 4 × single 40 mm Bofors guns; 12 × 20 mm (0.79 in) Oerlikon cannons

Service record
- Part of: LST Division 14
- Operations: Capture and occupation of Saipan (15 June–30 July 1944); Capture and occupation of Tinian (24–30 July 1944); Leyte landings (20 October 1944); Lingayen Gulf landings (9 January 1945); Nasugbu (31 January 1945); Assault and occupation of Okinawa Gunto (2–22 May 1945)
- Awards: Navy Unit Commendation; American Campaign Medal; Asiatic–Pacific Campaign Medal; World War II Victory Medal; Philippine Republic Presidential Unit Citation; Philippine Liberation Medal

USS LST-461 was a United States Navy LST-1-class tank landing ship used in the Asiatic-Pacific Theater during World War II. As with many of her class, the ship was never named. Instead, she was referred to by her hull designation.

== Construction ==
The ship was laid down on 30 September 1942, under Maritime Commission (MARCOM) contract, MC hull 981, by Kaiser Shipyards, Vancouver, Washington; launched 3 November 1942; sponsored by Mrs. Eugene E. Blazier; and commissioned on 18 February 1943.

== Service history ==
During World War II, LST-461 was assigned to the Asiatic-Pacific theater. She took part in the capture and occupation of Saipan in June and July 1944; in the capture and occupation of Tinian in July 1944; the Leyte operation in October 1944; the Lingayen Gulf landings in January 1945; in the Nasugbu operations in January 1945; and the assault and occupation of Okinawa Gunto in May 1945.

Following the war, LST-461 returned to the United States and was decommissioned on 2 September 1947, and struck from the Navy list on 16 September, that same year. On 30 March 1948, the tank landing ship was sold to Consolidated Builders, Inc., of Seattle, Washington, and subsequently scrapped.

== Honors and awards ==
LST-461 earned six battle stars for her World War II service.

== Notes ==
Citations

== Bibliography ==
Online resources

- "LST-461". Dictionary of American Naval Fighting Ships. Naval History and Heritage Command. This article incorporates text from this source, which is in the public domain.
- "Kaiser Vancouver, Vancouver WA". www.ShipbuildingHistory.com. 27 November 2010.
- "USS LST-461". NavSource. 9 October 2015.
