= USS LST-480 =

LST-1-class tank landing ship

Coordinates: 21.35725°N 157.9972°W

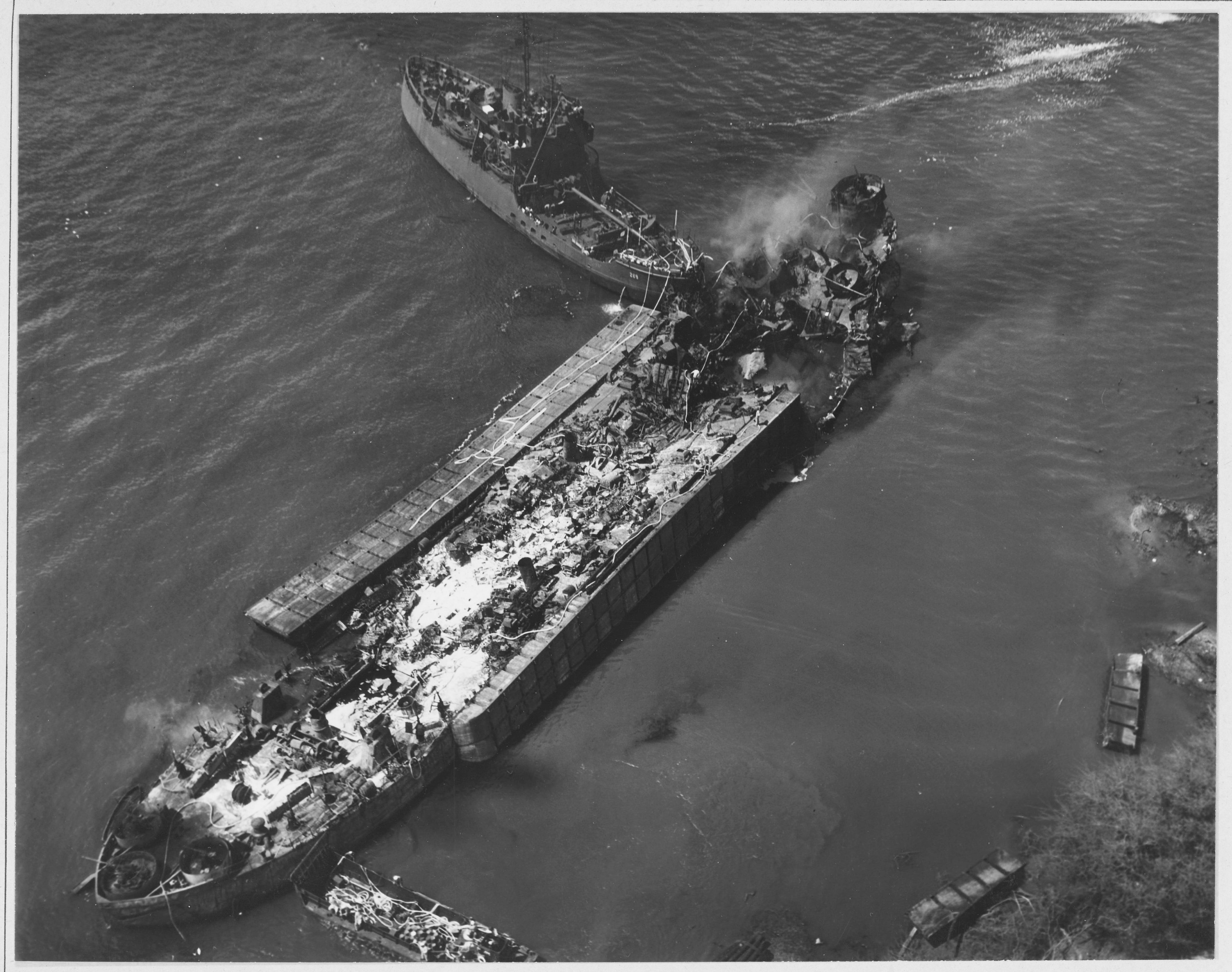
- Overhead view of the burning hulk of USS LST-480, in the West Loch, Pearl Harbor, 22 May 1944. The yard craft with her bow on the bow of LST-480 appears to be an LCM, while the ship at her stern is USCGC Woodbine.

History

United States
- Name: LST-480
- Ordered: as a Type S3-M-K2 hull, MCE hull 1000
- Builder: Permanente Metals Corporation, Richmond, California
- Yard number: 35
- Laid down: 31 August 1942
- Launched: 29 October 1942
- Commissioned: 3 May 1943
- Out of service: 21 May 1944
- Stricken: 18 July 1944 or; 8 May 1946
- Identification: Hull symbol: LST-480; Code letters: NGQO
- Honors and awards: 2 × battle stars
- Fate: Sunk by accidental explosion of ammunition 21 May 1944

General characteristics
- Class & type: LST-1-class tank landing ship
- Displacement: 4,080 long tons (4,145 t) full load; 2,160 long tons (2,190 t) landing
- Length: 328 ft (100 m) oa
- Beam: 50 ft (15 m)
- Draft: Full load: 8 ft 2 in (2.49 m) forward; 14 ft 1 in (4.29 m) aft; Landing at 2,160 t: 3 ft 11 in (1.19 m) forward; 9 ft 10 in (3.00 m) aft
- Installed power: 2 × 900 hp (670 kW) Electro-Motive Diesel 12-567A diesel engines; 1,700 shp (1,300 kW)
- Propulsion: 1 × Falk main reduction gears; 2 × Propellers
- Speed: 12 kn (22 km/h; 14 mph)
- Range: 24,000 nmi (44,000 km; 28,000 mi) at 9 kn (17 km/h; 10 mph) while displacing 3,960 long tons (4,024 t)
- Boats & landing craft carried: 2 or 6 x LCVPs
- Capacity: 2,100 tons oceangoing maximum; 350 tons main deckload
- Troops: 16 officers, 147 enlisted men
- Complement: 13 officers, 104 enlisted men
- Armament: Varied, ultimate armament; 2 × twin 40 mm (1.57 in) Bofors guns; 4 × single 40 mm Bofors guns; 12 × 20 mm (0.79 in) Oerlikon cannons

Service record
- Operations: Gilbert Islands operations (21 November–8 December 1943); Occupation of Kwajalein and Majuro Atolls (1–6 February 1944)
- Awards: American Campaign Medal; Asiatic–Pacific Campaign Medal; World War II Victory Medal

USS LST-480 was an LST-1-class tank landing ship built for the United States Navy used in the Asiatic-Pacific Theater during World War II.

== Construction ==
LST-480 was laid down on 31 August 1942, under Maritime Commission (MARCOM) contract, MC hull 1000, by Kaiser Shipyards, Yard No. 4, Richmond, California; launched on 29 October 1942; and commissioned on 3 May 1943.

== World War II Pacific Theatre operations ==
During World War II, LST-480 was assigned to the Asiatic-Pacific theater and participated in the following operations:

- Gilbert Islands operation: Capture and occupation of Gilbert Islands, 13 November to 8 December 1943.
- Marshall Islands operation: Occupation of Kwajalein and Majuro Atolls, 29 January to 8 February 1944.

=== Sinking ===
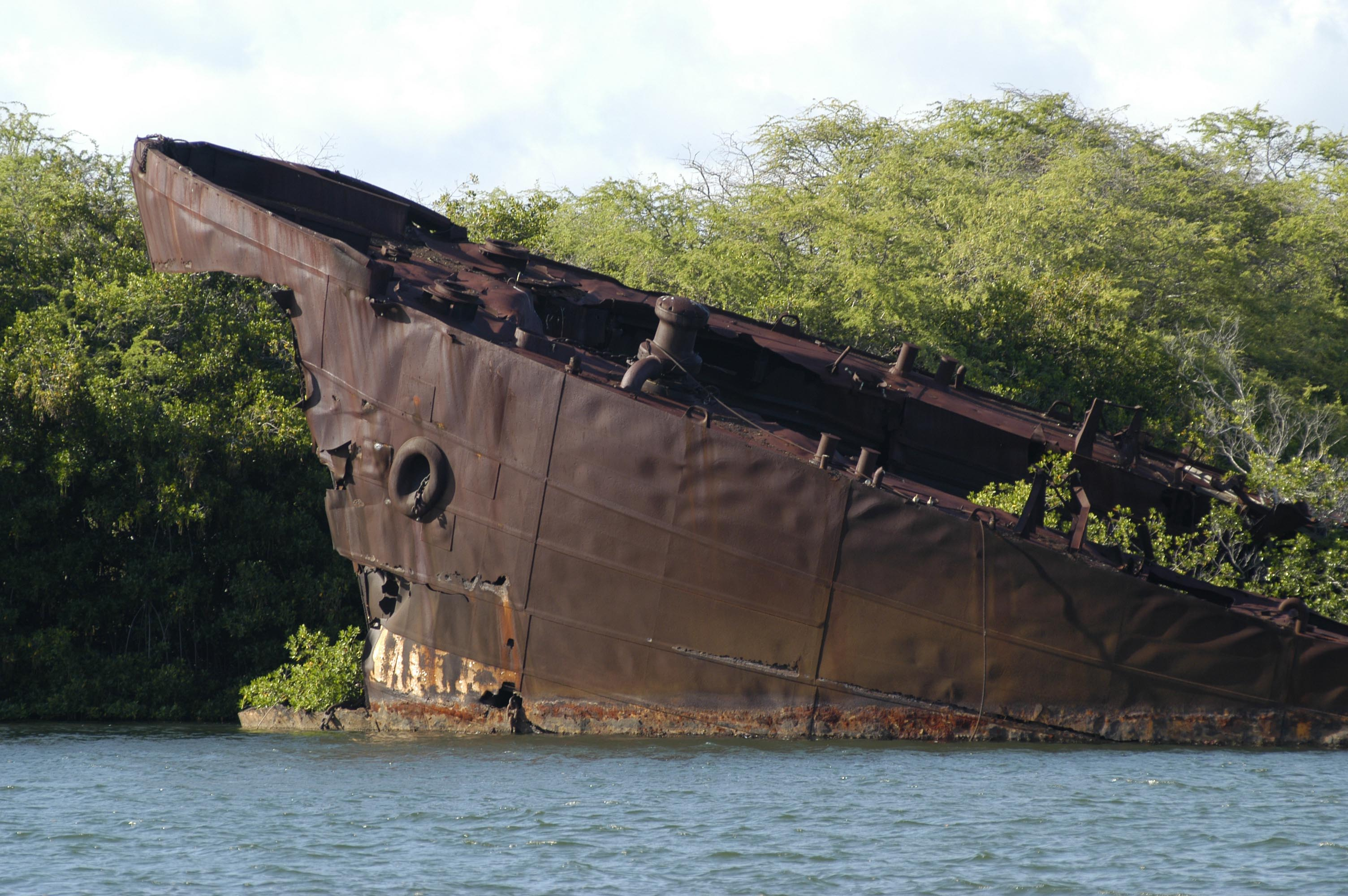
The rusting remains of LST-480.

On 21 May 1944, LST-480 and at least 28 to 33 other LSTs were gathered near Waipio peninsula, in Pearl Harbor's West Loch, loading ammunition and supplies in preparation for the invasion of Saipan.

At 15:08, an explosion onboard LST-353, which may have originated near LCT-963, caused a chain reaction that would eventually sink LST-480, LST-353, and four other LSTs. At least two other LSTs were severely damaged and 163 sailors were killed with another 396 wounded.

While the other ships were removed and sunk at sea, the wreck of LST-480 can still be seen in the West Loch.

== Awards ==
LST-480 earned two battle stars for World War II service.

== Notes ==
Citations

== Bibliography ==
Online resources

- "LST-480". Dictionary of American Naval Fighting Ships. Naval History and Heritage Command. This article incorporates text from this source, which is in the public domain.
- "Kaiser Permanente No. 4, Richmond CA". ShipbuildingHistory.com. 5 February 2014.
- "USS LST-480". NavSource. 20 May 2016.
- "West Loch Disaster". United States Navy.
- "West Loch Disaster". National Park Service. 27 April 2001.
- "Memorial Day, 2009". The Boston Globe. 25 May 2009.
