= USS LST-353 =

1942 LST-1-class tank landing ship

Coordinates: 21°21′25.83″N 157°59′49.98″W

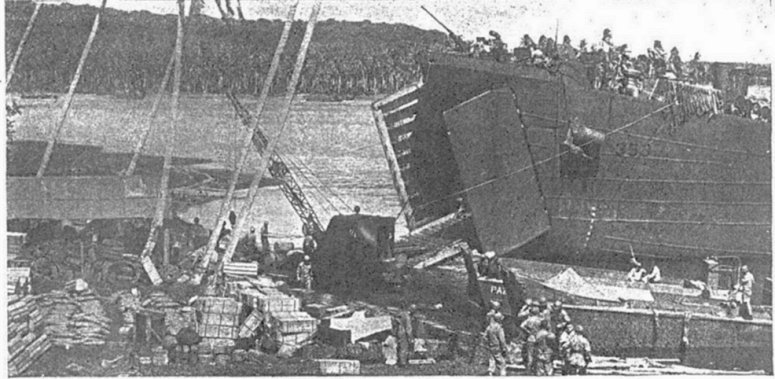
- LST-353 unloading in the Solomons, June 1943

History

United States
- Name: USS LST-353
- Builder: Charleston Navy Yard
- Laid down: 15 July 1942
- Launched: 12 October 1942
- Commissioned: 27 November 1942
- Stricken: 18 July 1944
- Honours and awards: 3 battle stars and Navy Unit Commendation (WWII)
- Fate: Sunk, 21 May 1944

General characteristics
- Class & type: LST-1-class tank landing ship
- Displacement: 1,780 long tons (1,809 t) light; 3,880 long tons (3,942 t) full
- Length: 328 ft (100 m)
- Beam: 50 ft (15 m)
- Draft: Unloaded: Bow: 2 ft 4 in (0.71 m); Stern: 7 ft 6 in (2.29 m); Loaded : Bow: 8 ft 2 in (2.49 m); Stern: 14 ft 1 in (4.29 m)
- Depth: 8 ft (2.4 m) forward; 14 ft 4 in (4.37 m) aft (full load)
- Propulsion: 2 General Motors 12-567 diesel engines, two shafts, twin rudders
- Speed: 12 knots (22 km/h; 14 mph)
- Boats & landing craft carried: Two or six LCVPs
- Troops: approx. 140 officers and enlisted
- Complement: 8-10 officers, 100-115 enlisted
- Armament: 5 × 40 mm gun mounts; 6 × 20 mm gun mounts; 2 × .50 cal (12.7 mm) machine guns; 4 × .30 cal (7.62 mm) machine guns

USS LST-353 was an LST-1-class tank landing ship built for the United States Navy during World War II. It was destroyed on 21 May 1944 when an explosion on its deck sparked the West Loch Disaster in Pearl Harbor naval base.

== Construction and service ==
LST-353 was laid down on 15 July 1942 at the Charleston Navy Yard; launched on 12 October 1942; sponsored by Mrs. Estelle Lynette Cushman; and commissioned on 27 November 1942. During World War II, LST-353 was assigned to the Asiatic-Pacific theater and participated in the following operations: the consolidation of the southern Solomons (June, 1943); the New Georgia-Rendova-Vangunu occupation (July, 1943); the Vella Lavella occupation (August, 1943); and the occupation and defense of Cape Torokina (November, 1943).

== Loss ==
On 21 May 1944 she was sunk by internal explosion while moored in West Loch at Pearl Harbor, Hawaii and struck from the Naval Vessel Register on 18 July 1944.

Five other LSTs were so damaged from the fire caused by the explosion that they too sank, including LST-43, LST-69, LST-179, and LST-480. Two others were severely damaged. In all 163 sailors were killed; 396 wounded.

LST-353 earned three battle stars and the Navy Unit Commendation for World War II service.

== See also ==
- List of United States Navy LSTs
- List of United States Navy losses in World War II
