= USS LST-39 =

1943 tank landing ship of the US Navy

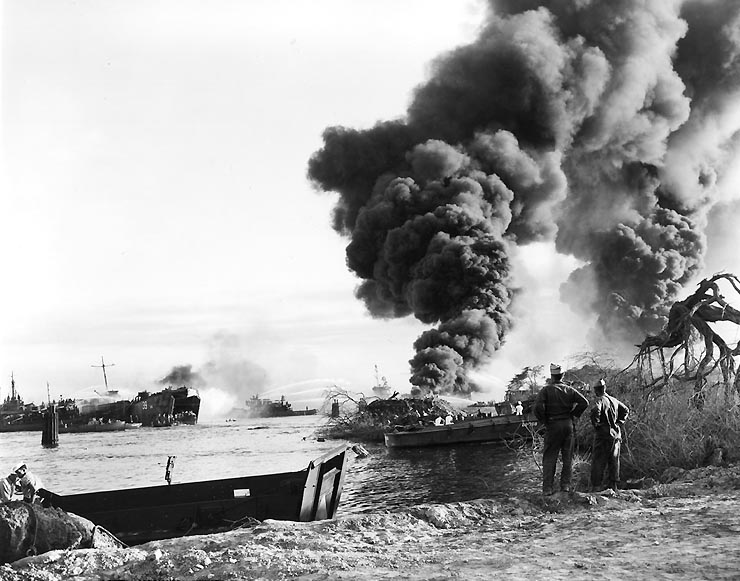
- USS LST-39 and USS LST-480 still ablaze on 22 May 1944.

History

United States
- Name: LST-39
- Builder: Dravo Corporation, Pittsburgh, Pennsylvania
- Laid down: 23 April 1943
- Launched: 29 July 1943
- Commissioned: 2 September 1943 (Partial commission); 8 September 1943 (Full commission)
- Stricken: 18 July 1944
- Identification: Hull symbol: LST-39; Code letters: NGXV
- Fate: Sunk, 21 May 1944, later refloated

United States
- Name: YF-1079
- Out of service: c. July 1945 – January 1946
- Reclassified: Spare Parts Issue Barge
- Stricken: 25 February 1946
- Identification: Hull symbol: YF-1079
- Fate: Destroyed, 1946

General characteristics
- Type: LST-1-class tank landing ship
- Displacement: 4,080 long tons (4,145 t) full load; 2,160 long tons (2,190 t) landing
- Length: 328 ft (100 m) oa
- Beam: 50 ft (15 m)
- Draft: Full load: 8 ft 2 in (2.49 m) forward; 14 ft 1 in (4.29 m) aft; Landing at 2,160 t: 3 ft 11 in (1.19 m) forward; 9 ft 10 in (3.00 m) aft
- Installed power: 2 × 900 hp (670 kW) Electro-Motive Diesel 12-567A diesel engines; 1,700 shp (1,300 kW)
- Propulsion: 1 × Falk main reduction gears; 2 × Propellers
- Speed: 12 kn (22 km/h; 14 mph)
- Range: 24,000 nmi (44,000 km; 28,000 mi) at 9 kn (17 km/h; 10 mph) while displacing 3,960 long tons (4,024 t)
- Boats & landing craft carried: 2 or 6 x LCVPs
- Capacity: 2,100 tons oceangoing maximum; 350 tons main deckload
- Troops: 16 officers, 147 enlisted men
- Complement: 13 officers, 104 enlisted men
- Armament: Varied, ultimate armament; 2 × twin 40 mm (1.57 in) Bofors guns; 4 × single 40 mm Bofors guns; 12 × 20 mm (0.79 in) Oerlikon cannons

Service record
- Awards: American Campaign Medal; Asiatic–Pacific Campaign Medal; World War II Victory Medal

USS LST-39 was a United States Navy LST-1-class tank landing ship used exclusively in the Asiatic-Pacific Theater during World War II. Like many of her class, she was not named and is properly referred to by her hull designation.

== Construction ==
LST-39 was laid down on 23 April 1943, at Pittsburgh, Pennsylvania by the Dravo Corporation; launched on 29 July 1943; sponsored by Mrs. L. A. Mertz; and commissioned on 8 September 1943.

== Service history ==
During World War II, LST-39 was assigned to the Asiatic-Pacific theater, but saw no combat action. She sank 21 May 1944, as part of the West Loch disaster and she was struck from the Navy list on 18 July 1944.

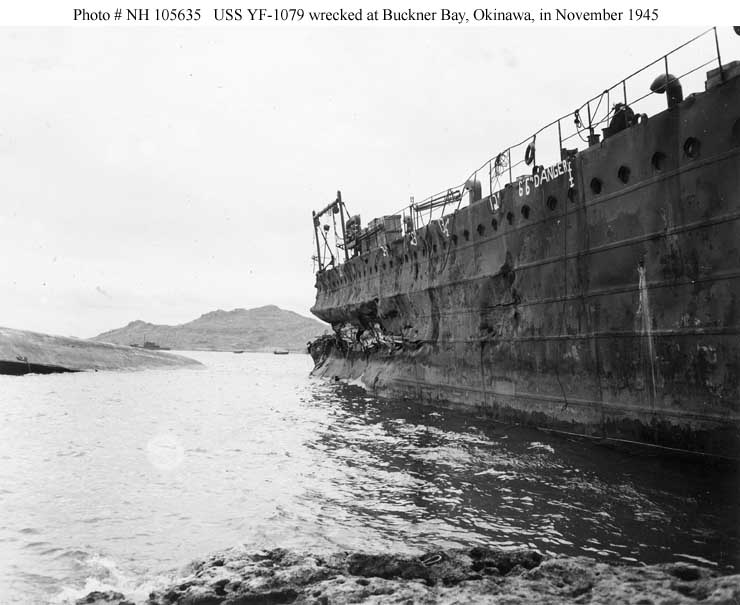
YF-1079 beached and damaged in Buckner Bay, Okinawa, after Typhoon Louise ravaged that port in October 1945. Photographed in November 1945. The image shows the after portion of her starboard side, which was damaged by a collision with another YF during the storm. Another service craft, possibly YF-757, lies sunken to the left.

She was later refloated, converted to a spare parts issue barge, and redesignated YF-1079. In early October 1945, YF-1079 was in Buckner Bay, when Typhoon Louise passed over. She was one of over 200 US military vessels to be grounded or severely damaged. During the storm she was struck by another ship, severely damaging her starboard side. She was again struck from the Navy list 25 February 1946, and destroyed August 1946.

== See also ==
- Landing craft
- List of United States Navy LSTs

== Bibliography ==
- "LST-39". Dictionary of American Naval Fighting Ships. Naval History and Heritage Command. 30 July 2015. This article incorporates text from this source, which is in the public domain.
- "USS LST-39". NavSource. 16 September 2016.
- Photo gallery of USS LST-39 at NavSource Naval History
