= USS LST-43 =

LST-1-class landing ship tank

History

United States
- Name: LST-43
- Builder: Dravo Corporation, Pittsburgh, Pennsylvania
- Laid down: 19 June 1943
- Launched: 28 August 1943
- Sponsored by: Mrs. C. A. Hill
- Commissioned: 6 October 1943
- Stricken: 18 July 1944
- Identification: Callsign: NPKS
- Honors and awards: See Awards
- Fate: Sunk as target, 1945

General characteristics
- Class & type: LST-1-class tank landing ship
- Displacement: 4,080 long tons (4,145 t) full load; 2,160 long tons (2,190 t) landing
- Length: 328 ft (100 m) oa
- Beam: 50 ft (15 m)
- Draft: Full load: 8 ft 2 in (2.49 m) forward; 14 ft 1 in (4.29 m) aft; Landing at 2,160 t: 3 ft 11 in (1.19 m) forward; 9 ft 10 in (3.00 m) aft
- Installed power: 2 × 900 hp (670 kW) Electro-Motive Diesel 12-567A diesel engines; 1,700 shp (1,300 kW)
- Propulsion: 1 × Falk main reduction gears; 2 × Propellers
- Speed: 12 kn (22 km/h; 14 mph)
- Range: 24,000 nmi (44,000 km; 28,000 mi) at 9 kn (17 km/h; 10 mph) while displacing 3,960 long tons (4,024 t)
- Boats & landing craft carried: 2 or 6 x LCVPs
- Capacity: 2,100 tons oceangoing maximum; 350 tons main deckload
- Troops: 16 officers, 147 enlisted men
- Complement: 13 officers, 104 enlisted men
- Armament: Varied, ultimate armament; 2 × twin 40 mm (1.57 in) Bofors guns; 4 × single 40 mm Bofors guns; 12 × 20 mm (0.79 in) Oerlikon cannons

USS LST-43 was a United States Navy LST-1-class tank landing ship used exclusively in the Asiatic-Pacific Theater during World War II. Like many of her class, she was not named and is properly referred to by her hull designation.

== Construction ==
LST-43 was laid down on 19 June 1943, at Pittsburgh, Pennsylvania, by the Dravo Corporation; launched on 28 August 1943; sponsored by Mrs. C. A. Hill; and commissioned on 6 October 1943.

== Service history ==
During World War II, LST-43 was assigned to the Asiatic-Pacific theater. She took part in the Occupation of Kwajalein and Majuro Atolls from 31 January to 8 February 1944.

She was destroyed and sunk during the West Loch disaster alongside 5 other LSTs at Pearl Harbor, on 21 May 1944.

LST-43 was struck from the Navy Register on 18 July 1944.

In 1945, she was raised but deemed too expensive to be repaired thus she was towed out to sea and sunk again as a target ship for torpedoes.

== Awards ==
LST-43 have earned the following awards:

- American Campaign Medal
- Asiatic-Pacific Campaign Medal (1 battle star)
- World War II Victory Medal

== Bibliography ==
- "LST-42". Dictionary of American Naval Fighting Ships. Naval History and Heritage Command. 30 July 2015. This article incorporates text from this source, which is in the public domain.
- "USS LST-43". NavSource. 4 July 2014.
