= West Loch disaster =

1944 maritime disaster at Pearl Harbor, Hawaii

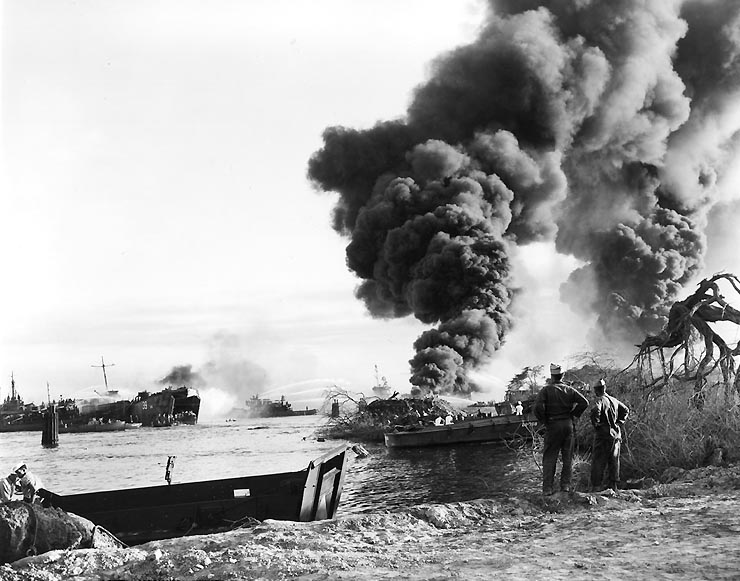
- LST-39 and LST-480 still ablaze on 22 May 1944.
Date	21 May 1944
Location	West Loch, Pearl Harbor U.S. Naval Base, Hawaii
Result	163 killed 396 injured 6 LSTs Sunk

The West Loch Disaster was a maritime accident during World War II at Pearl Harbor U.S. Naval Base in Hawaii. The incident, which occurred just after 3 p.m. on Sunday, 21 May 1944, began following an explosion in a staging area for Landing Ships, Tank (LSTs) and other amphibious assault ships in West Loch. A fire quickly spread among the ships being prepared for Operation Forager, the invasion of the Japanese-held Mariana Islands. Over the next 24 hours, six LSTs sank, 163 naval personnel died, and 396 were injured.

A subsequent Naval Board of Inquiry never determined the exact cause of the disaster but concluded that the initial explosion was caused when a mortar round aboard LST-353 detonated during an unloading operation because it was either dropped or went off when gasoline vapors ignited. The incident – together with the Port Chicago disaster two months later – led to major changes in weapons-handling practices within the United States Navy.

The LST wreckage was quickly cleared in a salvage operation and dumped at sea 3 mi (2.6 nmi; 4.8 km) south of Hawaii. Only the hull of the partially beached LST-480 was left in West Loch. A press blackout was enforced and naval personnel were ordered not to talk about the incident. The disaster was classified until 1960 and is therefore not well known.

The disaster has been the focus of considerable speculation that during the salvage and removal of the wrecks from West Loch, the U.S. Navy might have found the remains of a Japanese midget submarine, possibly the fifth Japanese midget submarine used in the Pearl Harbor attack in December 1941.

== Background ==
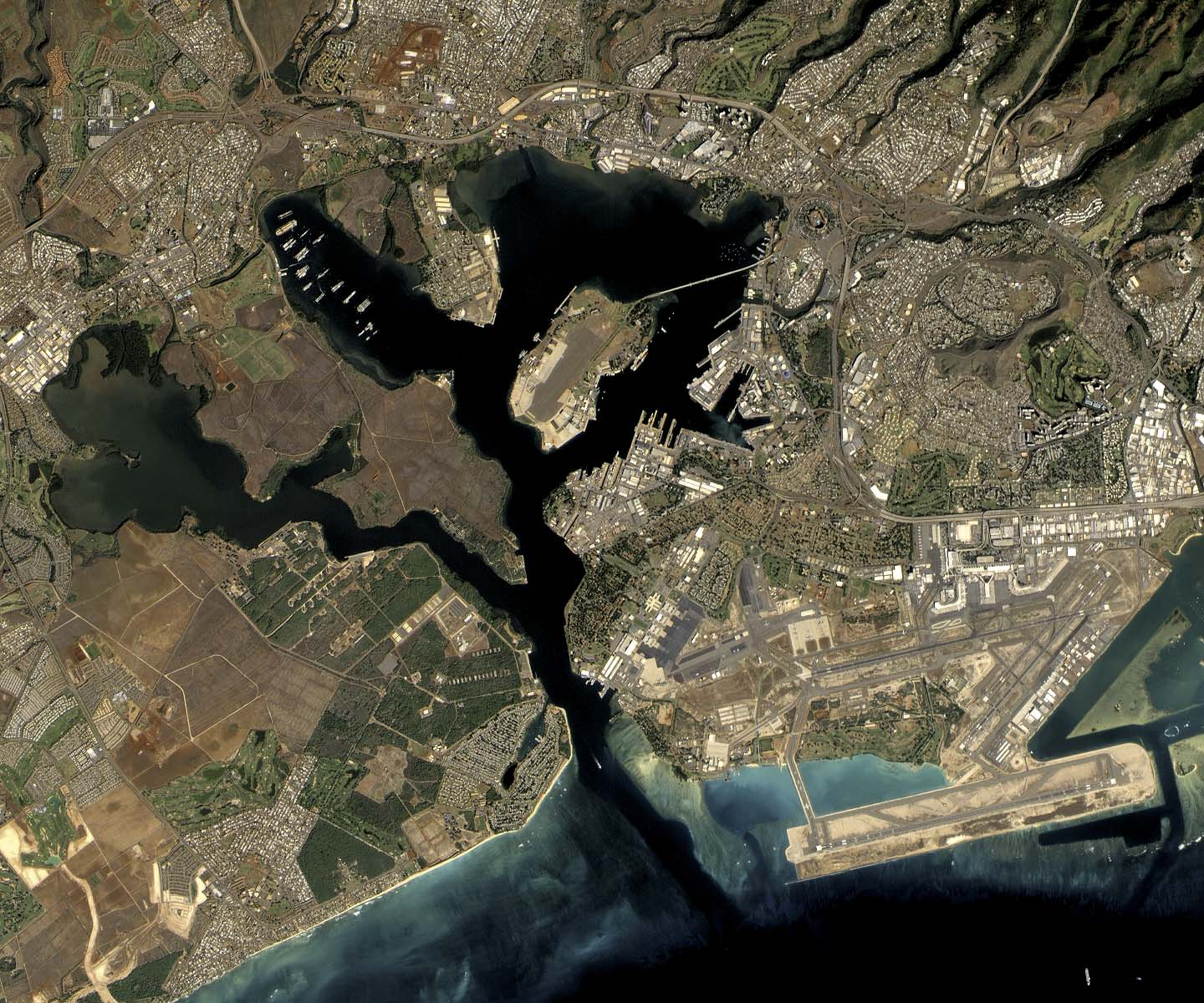
Pearl Harbor naval base. The West Loch is the arm of Pearl Harbor on the left side of the image.

In May 1944, the West Loch area of Pearl Harbor was unusually crowded with various vessels as it was being used as a staging area for the upcoming Operation Forager, the US invasion to retake Japanese-occupied Marianas and Palau Islands. Twenty-nine Landing Ships, Tank (LSTs) were tied up, beam to beam, at six Tare piers. Many of the LSTs, in addition to carrying their own complement of munitions and fuel, were also fully loaded with the munitions, fuel, vehicles, equipment, and other general stores required by the 2nd and 4th Marine Divisions for the invasion of the Marianas, that was to begin in mid-June. To aid quick deployment once ashore, high-octane gasoline was stored in barrels on deck.

In the weeks leading up to the incident, the vessels and crews had all been training for the upcoming invasion. The LSTs were each crewed by around 120 Navy sailors or Coast Guardsmen, and manned by around 200 Marine loaders, drivers and mechanics. The rapid expansion of the fleet meant many of the crews were made up of inexperienced sailors and Marines. On 21 May, many of the LSTs had only half their crew aboard because, after a week of intensive training, most officers and ratings had been given shore leave.

== Explosion ==
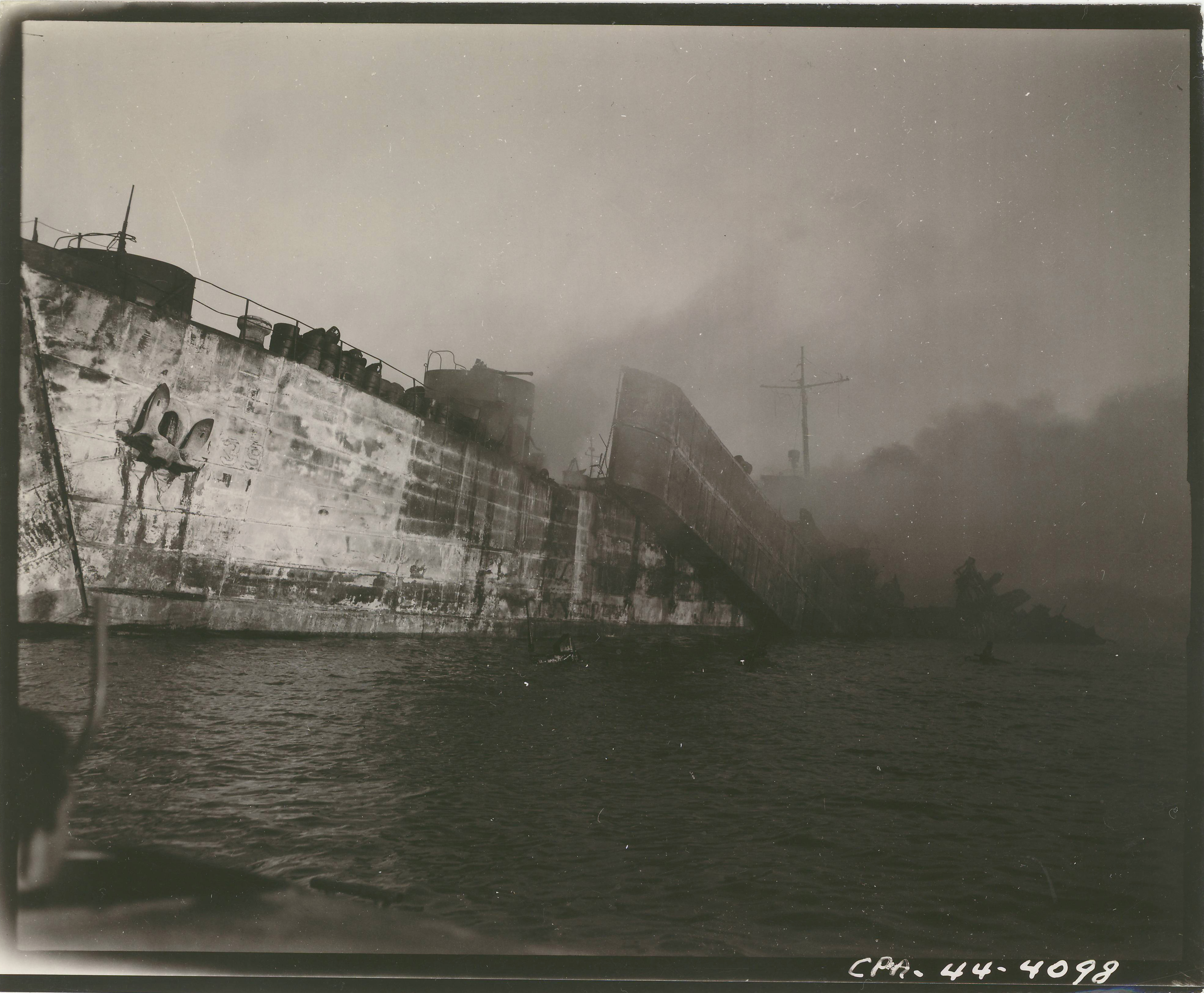
The burned hulk of LST-39 on 21 May 1944.

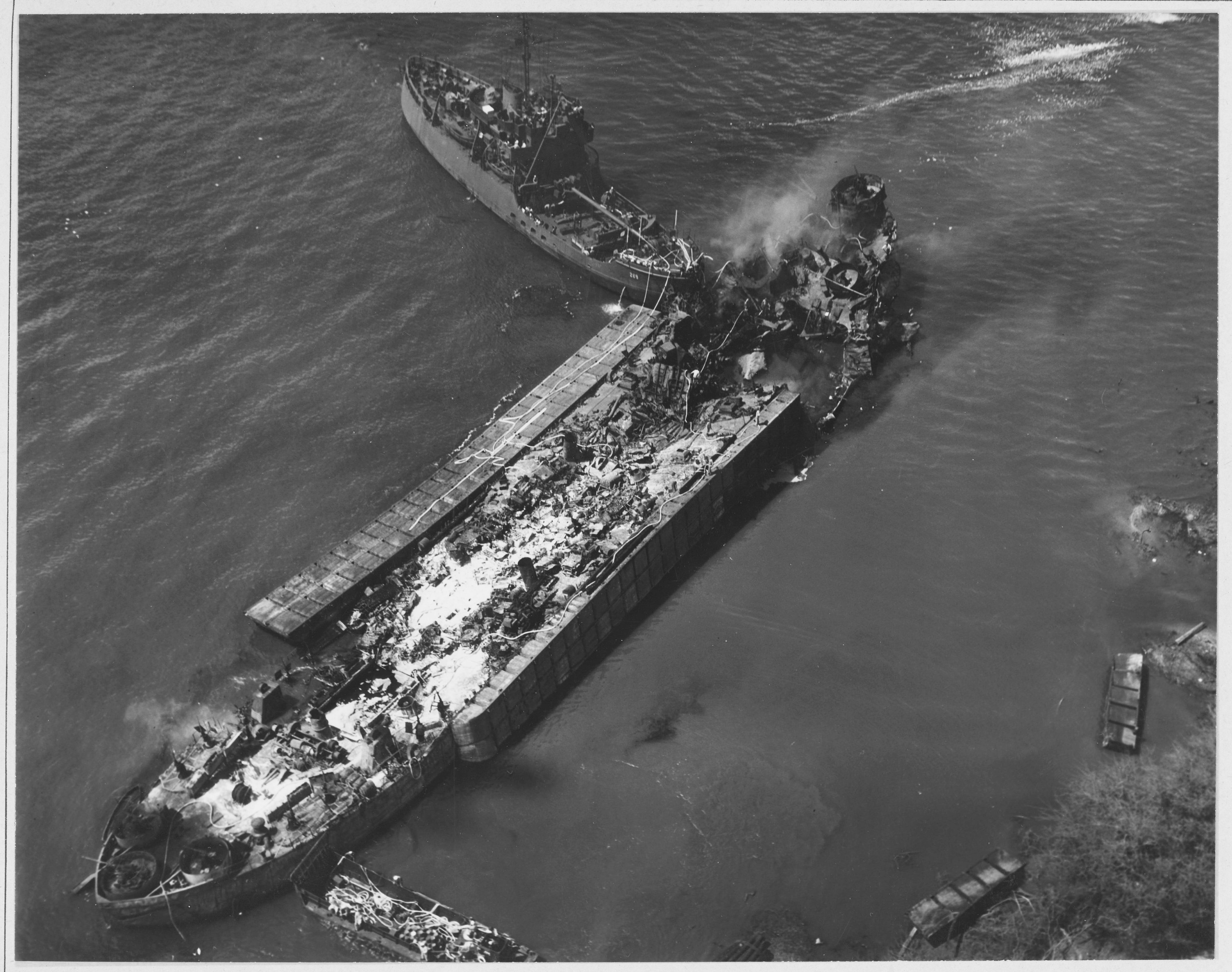
LST-480 on 22 May 1944.

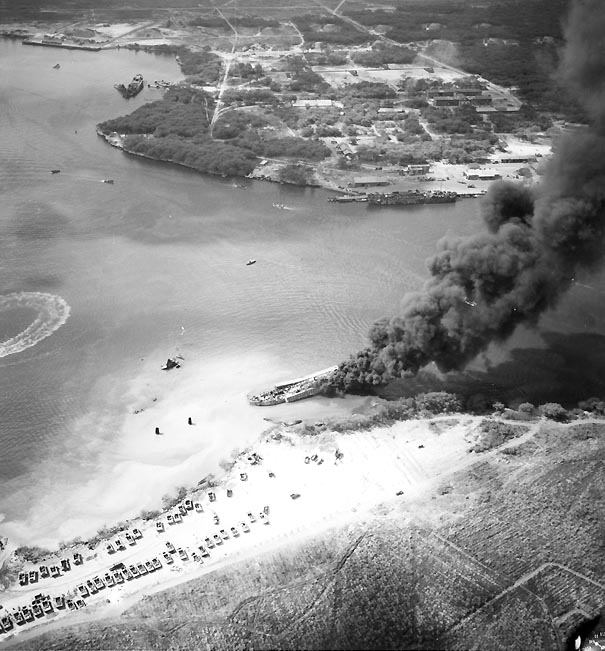
LST-480 burns again on 23 May 1944. The sunken LST-353 where the disaster originated lies off her starboard bow

At 15:08, LST-353, moored at Tare 8, exploded, sending a large fireball into the sky. The noise was heard miles away at Pearl Harbor Headquarters. Una and Sandy Walker were with Admiral Chester W. Nimitz at his quarters when they heard the explosions. Because of the "L.S.T. tragedy", wrote Una, they cancelled a planned post-dinner cruise around Pearl Harbor aboard Nimitz's dark blue admiral's barge. Instead, they "rested with [a] private dinner with Adm. & Doc & Hal" at Makalapa. While they dined, the LSTs continued to explode and burn to the waterline. Nimitz was given updates on efforts to contain the disaster across the harbor. More explosions of increasing intensity followed, sparking fears of a Japanese attack or even an earthquake. Fire and debris raining down on the fuel and munitions stored on the decks of other LSTs had caused an explosive chain reaction. Within minutes, 200 men had been blown into the water. Eleven wooden buildings on the shore were destroyed and vehicles blown on their side. In all, 20 buildings were damaged.

Initial efforts by the crews to fight the fires were impeded by the heat, although some ships further away managed to muster damage control parties. Many of the LSTs tied together at Tare 8 began to sink. Within the hour, Admiral Richmond K. Turner was directing fire-fighting efforts from a launch.

Various LSTs managed to move to safety under their own power or with assistance by tugboats. However others were abandoned and allowed to drift, spreading fires, before sinking in the channel. Leaking oil ignited on the water also spread fires to Tares 7 and 9 even though they had been unharmed after the first explosions at Tare 8. Eventually tugboats and foam-carrying salvage ships from Pearl Harbor arrived to fight the spreading fires. One ship managed to turn a drifting LST away from a collision course with an ammunition ship docked across the loch at the ammunition depot.

A final explosion occurred at 22:30; while several LSTs continued to burn for 24 hours. In total, the harbor tugs Osceola, Hoga, and Geronimo, the net tender Tamaha, the chartered tug Mikioi, and smaller tugs YTL-233, YTL-306, YTL-307, YTL-308, YTL-309, and YTL-339 were damaged while engaged in fire control efforts.

== Casualties ==
The initial official account listed 27 dead and 100 missing. The majority of sources state the final death toll as 163 men, with a further 396 wounded. However, in 2005 the magazine, Sea Classics, claimed the total dead was 392, of which 163 were sailors. The other 229 were Marines from the newly formed 2nd and 4th Marine Divisions, while Army dead were not recorded in the confusion. Pearl Harbor attack survivor and historical researcher, Ray Emory, also disputes the official death toll; he believes 132 men died at West Loch.

== Investigation ==
A Naval Board of Inquiry, under Rear Admiral John F. Shafroth Jr., was opened in Pearl Harbor the following day. An early theory that the incident was the result of a Japanese submarine attack was dismissed as impractical because of the depth of the West Loch and the presence of anti-submarine nets.

The executive officer of LST-353 stated that immediately prior to the explosion, Army stevedores were unloading mortar ammunition from a Landing craft tank (LCT) on the deck of his ship. The procedure to remove the 107mm mortar rounds was being undertaken because training had proved M2 mortars could not be fired accurately from LCTs. The enquiry was told the unit given the order to unload the mortar rounds had received no training for the task. Meanwhile, 80 drums of fuel were stacked just 15 ft (4.6 m) from the elevator being used to unload the LCT.

Following testimony, the Naval Enquiry Board concluded that a mortar round exploded on LST-353 sparking a chain reaction. However it could not determine the actual cause of the detonation because all those nearest to the explosion were killed. This conclusion was sustained by subsequent reviews. The two most plausible explanations were considered to be:

1. the accidental dropping of a mortar round being unloaded from the LCT on the LST-353
2. the ignition of gasoline vapors from high-octane fuel drums stored on the deck of LST-353. The source being a cigarette (although banned) or welding, which had also been occurring that day aboard LST-353.

The enquiry also heard the conduct of the inexperienced crews may have exacerbated the disaster. Lieutenant Commander Joseph B. Hoyt, USNR, the Commander of LST Group 39, Flotilla 13, criticized many of the LST crews for abandoning their vessels too early, leaving them to sink or drift, rather than fire-fighting or attempting to beach them. However he praised the efforts of the crew from LST-274, which received heavy damage but was saved. Several crews and skippers were called to account for inadequate reactions to the emergency, although the severity of the conditions were cited as mitigating factors.

In the end no courts-martial or letters of reprimand were issued to anyone involved. The practice of loading fuel and munitions aboard closely moored vessels was deemed to be necessary under the conditions of war and the layout of Pearl Harbor U.S. Navy Base. A recommendation by the Board to avoid nesting in future was criticized by Admiral Chester W. Nimitz as impractical.

In his review of the proceedings, Admiral Ernest King, the Commander-in-Chief, US Fleet, wrote:

The organization, training and discipline in the LSTs involved in this disaster leave much to be desired. The lack of proper understanding and compliance with safety precautions when handling ammunition and gasoline, particularly in LST-353 where the first explosion occurred, is also noted. It is perfectly apparent that this disaster was not an "Act of God".

== Reporting ==
The United States military ordered a press blackout following the incident. The official inquiry was marked Top Secret and survivors and eyewitnesses were not permitted to mention the incident in letters home. Four days after the incident, the authorities released a one-paragraph statement noting an explosion had caused "some loss of life, a number of injuries and resulted in the destruction of several small vessels". It was only after Operation Forager that a fuller account was released to the press. The entire incident was not declassified and made public until 1960.

As a result of the secrecy surrounding the incident, it has been asserted that the public knows little about Pearl Harbor's "second disaster". As of 1997, the only book about the incident, The West Loch Story, was privately published by survivor, William L.C. Johnson. He alleges that a full account had not emerged from the Navy until 1964, and that the incident had been caused by careless smoking.

== Impact on Operation Forager ==
Six LSTs were sunk (LST-39, LST-43, LST-69, LST-179, LST-353, and LST-480), two already carrying smaller, fully loaded Landing craft tanks (LCT-961, 963 and 983) lashed to their decks. Several LSTs were damaged and/or ran aground. Four (including LST-205 and LST-225) could not be repaired in time for the invasion. Seventeen tracked landing vehicles (LVT) and eight 155 mm (6.1 in) guns were destroyed. Other sources place the total number of destroyed LSTs at nine. With reinforcement of the fleet from elsewhere, and through quick repair efforts, Operation Forager was only delayed by one day as a result of the incident, with the operation commencing essentially as planned three weeks later.

== Medal of Honor ==
Boatswain's Mate 2nd Class Francis P. Hammerberg, a Navy diver, posthumously received the Medal of Honor for heroism on 17 February 1945, during salvage operations on an LST sunk in the West Loch incident. He was killed in a cave-in while attempting to tunnel under one of the sunken LSTs. He was the only service member in World War II, and the last person of all, to receive the Medal of Honor for a non-combat action.

== Memorials ==
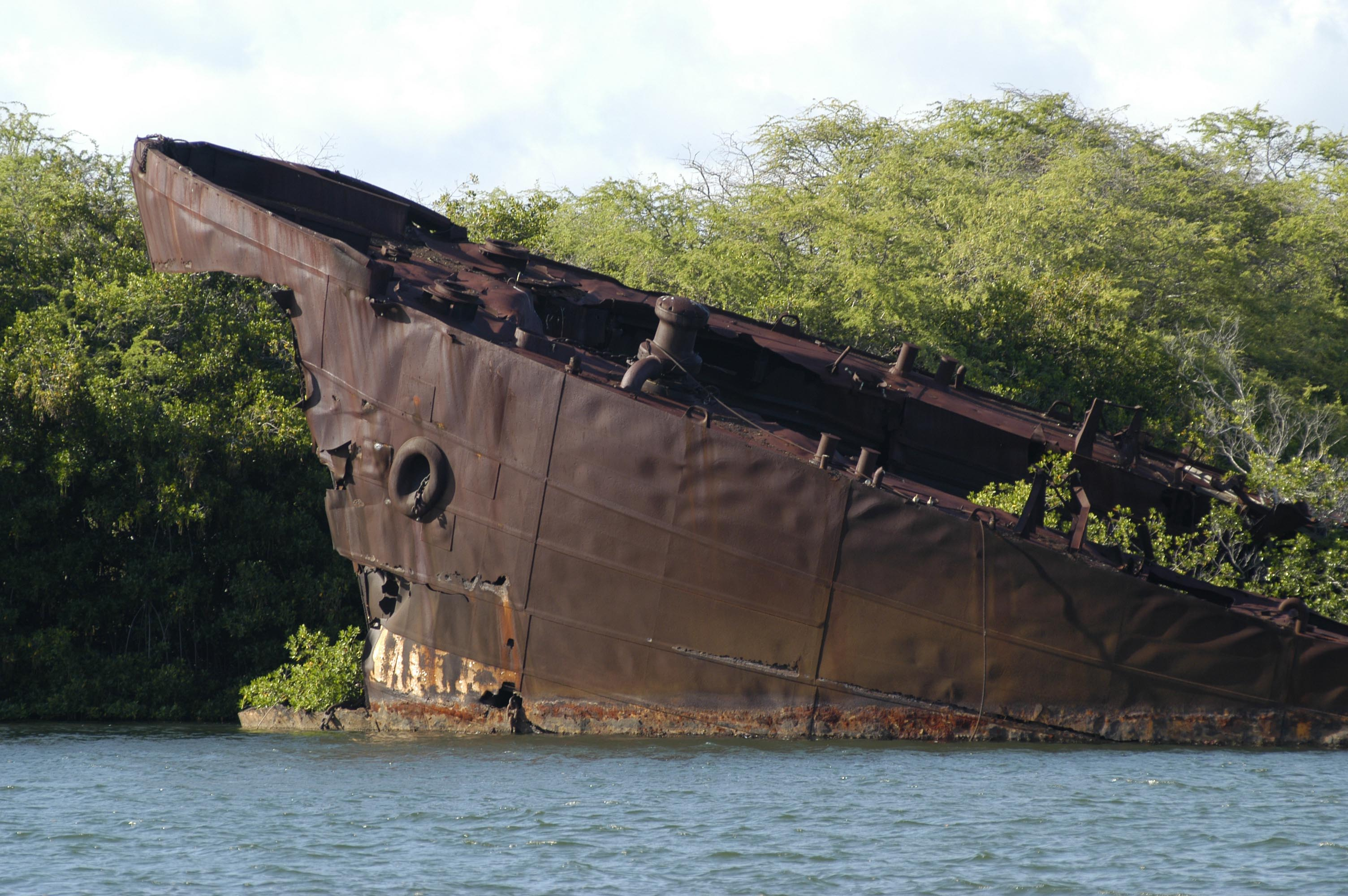
The rusting remains of LST-480 at 21°21′26.04″N 157°59′50.05″W.

In the weeks following the disaster, all wreckage was salvaged and removed, with the exception of LST-480 (sometimes reported as LST-353). Its rusting bow was left where it was beached during the disaster. In April 1995, the first memorial to the disaster was unveiled: a table-sized plaque sited on the shore of the loch. At the behest of Congress, gravestones of unidentified victims in the National Memorial Cemetery of the Pacific were amended in the 2000s from recording simply "unknown", to "Unknown, West Loch Disaster, 21 May 1944". The Navy commemorated the 65th anniversary of the disaster on 21 May 2009.

== Legacy ==
As a result of the incident, and the Port Chicago disaster two months later, the Navy drastically changed its ordnance-handling procedures. It insisted on full training for handlers, munitions to be redesigned for safer handling, and that vessels should no longer be nested together when ammunition was being loaded or handled.

It has been speculated that the salvage operation undertaken to clear the loch after the disaster may have found the fifth midget submarine involved in the 1941 attack on Pearl Harbor. After three pieces of the fifth midget submarine were confirmed to have been discovered three miles south of Pearl Harbor, in the debris field where much surplus American equipment had been dumped after the west loch disaster, a working theory was developed that this submarine, one in a group of five Japanese Ko-hyoteki class submarines involved in the attack had been recovered during the salvage operation and dumped in the ocean. Some researchers hypothesis that the sub had penetrated the harbor to attack Battleship Row, and fled into the West Loch and was possibly scuttled by the two-man crew. It is then suggested it was then salvaged from the loch bed along with the remains of the LSTs, LCTs and landing tanks, and then dumped at the ocean.

== See also ==
- List of accidents and disasters by death toll, explosions
- List of accidents and incidents involving transport or storage of ammunition
