= Atsumi-class tank landing ship =

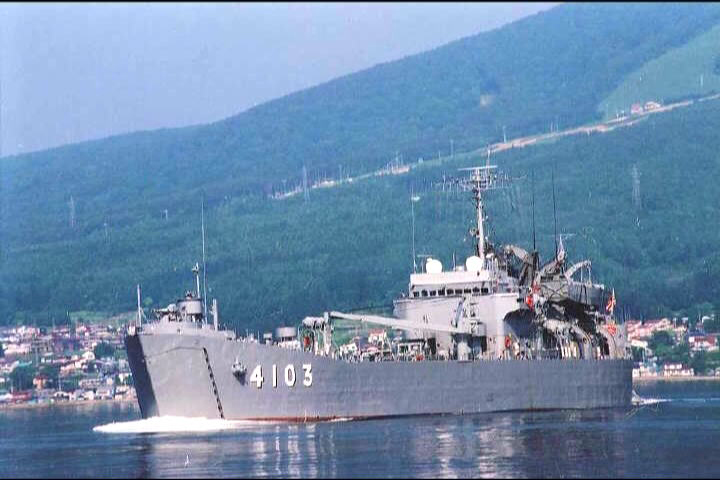
- JDS Nemuro

Class overview
- Name: Atsumi class
- Builders: Sasebo Naval Arsenal
- Operators: Japan Maritime Self-Defense Force
- Preceded by: Ōsumi-class
- Succeeded by: Miura-class
- Built: 1971-1977
- In commission: 1972-2005
- Planned: 3
- Completed: 3
- Retired: 3

General characteristics
- Type: Landing ship tank
- Displacement: 1,500 t (1,500 long tons) standard; 2,400 t (2,400 long tons) full load
- Length: 89 m (292 ft 0 in) oa
- Beam: 13 m (42 ft 8 in)
- Draft: 2.7 m (8 ft 10 in)
- Propulsion: 2 × Kawasaki-MAN V8V 22/30 AMTL diesel engines; 2 shafts propulsion; 3,300 kW (4,400 bhp)
- Speed: 14 knots (26 km/h; 16 mph)
- Boats & landing craft carried: 2 × LCVPs
- Complement: 100
- Sensors & processing systems: OPS-9 radar
- Armament: 2 × twin 40 mm (1.6 in) guns

The Atsumi-class landing ship tank is a class of three tank landing ships (LSTs) that served with the Japanese Maritime Self-Defense Force (JMSDF) from 1972 to 2005. They were primarily deployed for logistic support but were also used to carry heavy construction equipment such as trenchers.

== Description ==
The three Atsumi-class tank landing ships (LSTs) had a standard displacement of 1,500 tonnes (1,500 long tons) and 2,400 t (2,400 long tons) at full load. They were 89 m (292 ft 0 in) overall with a beam of 13 m (42 ft 8 in) and a draft of 2.7 m (8 ft 10 in). Ships in the class were powered by two Kawasaki-MAN V8V 22/30 AMTL diesel engines turning two shafts rated at 3,300 kilowatts (4,400 bhp). This gave them a maximum speed of 14 knots (26 km/h; 16 mph).

Vessels of the class carried two Landing Craft Vehicle Personnel (LCVPs). The LCVPs were slung under davits and a traveling gantry crane with folding rails that could be extended over the side handled the two LCMs positioned on the foredeck. The LSTs could carry up 130 troops. The Atsumi class were armed with twin-mounted 40 mm (1.6 in) guns in a single turret placed each at the bow and stern. The LSTs were equipped with OPS-9 air search. They had a complement of 100 officers and crew.

== Ships in the class ==
Atsumi class
Hull no.	Name	Builder	Laid down	Launched	Commissioned	Decommissioned
LST 4101	Atsumi	Sasebo Heavy Industries, Sasebo, Japan	7 December 1971	13 June 1972	27 November 1972	13 February 1998
LST 4102	Motobu	Sasebo Heavy Industries, Sasebo, Japan	23 April 1973	3 August 1973	21 December 1973	12 April 1999
LST 4103	Nemuro	Sasebo Heavy Industries, Sasebo, Japan	18 November 1976	16 June 1977	27 October 1977	20 May 2005

== Service history ==
Three tank landing ships were ordered from Sasebo Heavy Industries and constructed in Sasebo, Japan. The first of the class, Atsumi entered service in 1972 with the Japanese Maritime Self Defense Force (JMSDF), with Motobu following in 1973 and Nemuro in 1977. Primarily used for logistic support.

== See also ==
Equivalent landing ships of the same era

- Hoyerswerda class
- Kumbhir class
- Type 073
