= Miura-class tank landing ship =

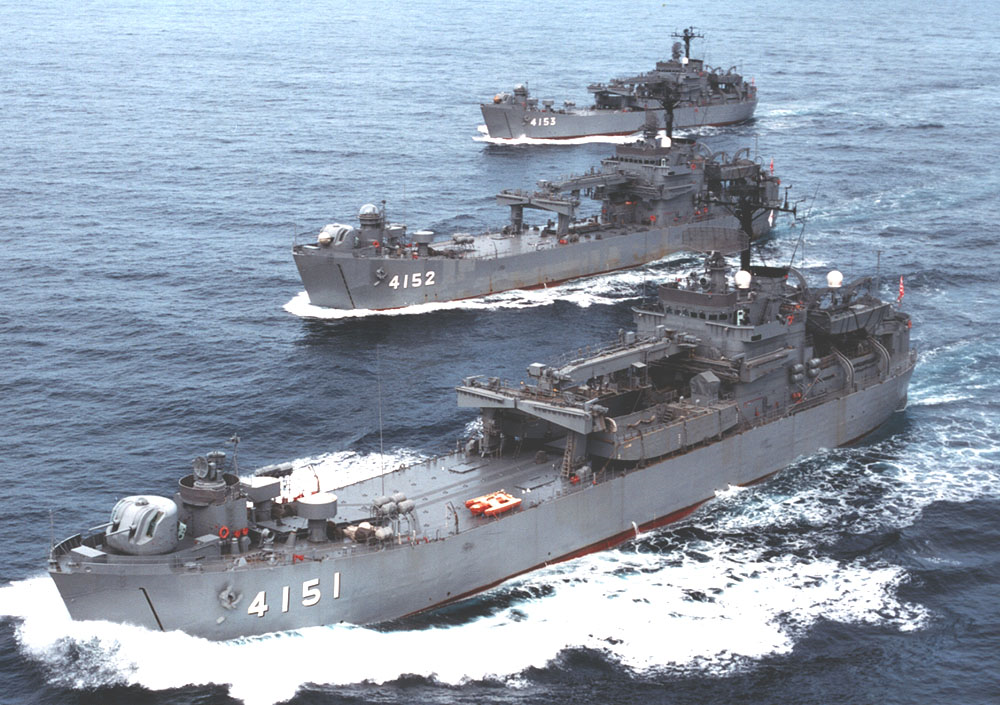
- The three Miura-class tank landing ships

Class overview
- Name: Miura class
- Builders: Ishikawajima-Harima Heavy Industries
- Operators: Japan Maritime Self-Defense Force
- Preceded by: Atsumi class
- Succeeded by: Ōsumi class
- Built: 1973–1975
- In commission: 1975–2002
- Planned: 3
- Completed: 3
- Retired: 3

General characteristics
- Type: Landing ship tank
- Displacement: 2,000 t (2,000 long tons) standard; 3,300 t (3,200 long tons) full load
- Length: 94 m (308 ft 5 in) pp; 98 m (321 ft 6 in) oa
- Beam: 14 m (45 ft 11 in)
- Draft: 3 m (9 ft 10 in)
- Propulsion: 2 × Kawasaki-MAN V8V 22/30 AMTL diesel engines; 2 shafts propulsion; 3,300 kW (4,400 bhp)
- Speed: 14 knots (26 km/h; 16 mph)
- Range: 4,300 nmi (8,000 km; 4,900 mi) at 12 knots (22 km/h; 14 mph)
- Boats & landing craft carried: 2 × LCVPs; 2 × LCMs
- Complement: 118
- Sensors & processing systems: OPS-14 radar; OPS-16 radar
- Armament: 1 × twin 76 mm (3 in)/50 guns; 1 × twin 40 mm (1.6 in) guns

The Miura-class landing ship tank is a class of three tank landing ships (LSTs) that served with the Japanese Maritime Self-Defense Force (JMSDF) from 1975 to 2002. They were primarily deployed for logistic support but were also used to carry heavy construction equipment such as trenchers.

== Description ==
The three Miura-class tank landing ships (LSTs) had a standard displacement of 2,000 tonnes (2,000 long tons) and 3,300 t (3,200 long tons) at full load. They were 94 meters (308 ft 5 in) long between perpendiculars and 98 m (321 ft 6 in) overall with a beam of 14 m (45 ft 11 in) and a draft of 3 m (9 ft 10 in). Ships in the class were powered by two Kawasaki-MAN V8V 22/30 AMTL diesel engines turning two shafts rated at 3,300 kilowatts (4,400 bhp). This gave them a maximum speed of 14 knots (26 km/h; 16 mph) and they carried enough diesel fuel for a range of 4,300 nautical miles (8,000 km; 4,900 mi) at 12 knots (22 km/h; 14 mph).

Vessels of the class carried two Landing Craft Vehicle Personnel (LCVPs) and two Landing Craft Mechanized (LCMs). The LCVPs were slung under davits and a traveling gantry crane with folding rails that could be extended over the side handled the two LCMs positioned on the foredeck. The LSTs could carry up to 200 troops or 1,800 t (1,800 long tons) of cargo, or ten Type 74 main battle tanks. The Miura class were armed with twin-mounted US Mark 33 76-millimeter (3 in)/50 caliber guns situated forward in a single turret and a twin-mounted 40 mm (1.6 in) guns in a single turret placed aft. The LSTs were equipped with OPS-14 air search and OPS-16 surface search radar. For fire control, Miura mounted a 72-1B for the 76 mm guns and US Mk 51 fire control for the 40 mm guns. The other two vessels were equipped with US Mk 63 fire control for the 76 mm guns and US Mk 51 for the 40 mm guns. They had a complement of 118 officers and crew.

== Ships in the class ==
Miura class
Hull no.	Name	Builder	Laid down	Launched	Commissioned	Decommissioned
LST 4151	Miura	Ishikawajima-Harima Heavy Industries, Tokyo, Japan	26 November 1973	13 August 1974	29 January 1975	7 April 2000
LST 4152	Ojika	Ishikawajima-Harima Heavy Industries, Tokyo, Japan	10 June 1974	2 September 1975	22 March 1976	10 August 2001
LST 4153	Satsuma	Ishikawajima-Harima Heavy Industries, Tokyo, Japan	26 May 1975	12 May 1976	17 February 1977	28 June 2002

== Service history ==
Three tank landing ships were ordered from Ishikawajima-Harima Heavy Industries and constructed in Tokyo, Japan. The first of the class, Miura entered service in 1975 with the Japanese Maritime Self Defense Force (JMSDF), with Ojika following in 1976 and Satsuma in 1977. Primarily used for logistic support, the Miura class has also been used to trial new guns for the JMSDF, which Satsuma did with the OTO Melara 76 mm Compact gun.

== See also ==
Equivalent landing ships of the same era

- Type 073
- Hengam class
- Teluk Semangka class
- Ropucha class
