= JDS Satsuma =

1976 Miura-class landing ship tank

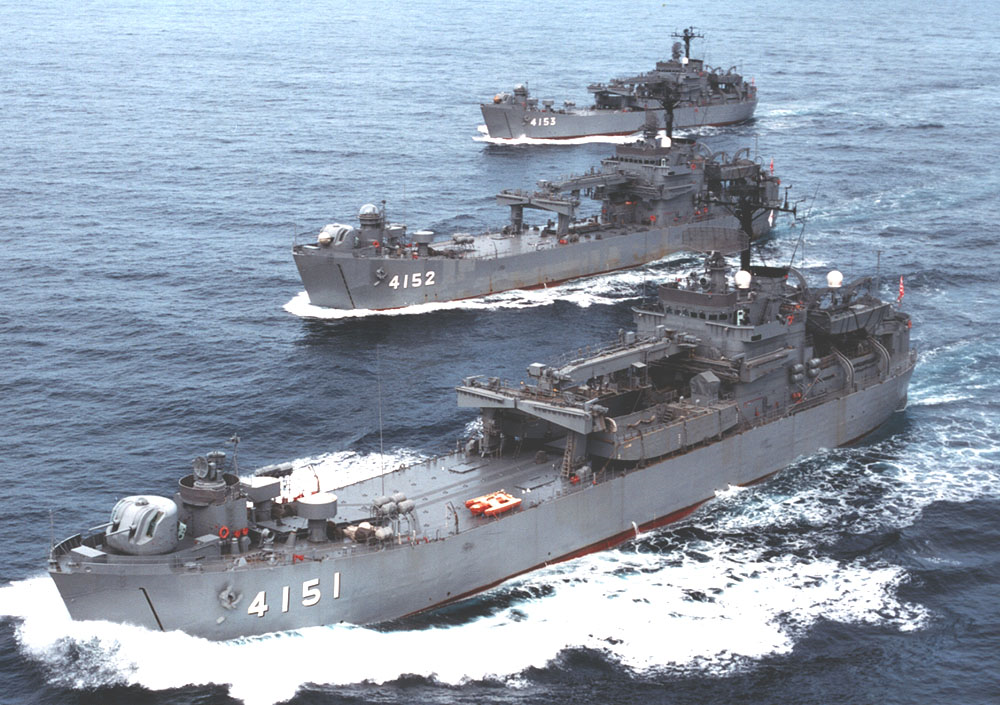
- JDS Satsuma at sea alongside 2 of her sister.

History

Japan
- Name: Satsuma; (さつま)
- Namesake: Satsuma
- Ordered: 1974
- Builder: Ishikawajima-Harima Heavy Industries
- Laid down: 26 May 1975
- Launched: 12 May 1976
- Commissioned: 17 February 1977
- Decommissioned: 28 June 2002
- Home port: Yokosuka
- Identification: LST-4153
- Status: Decommissioned

General characteristics
- Class & type: Miura-class tank landing ship
- Displacement: 2,000 t (2,000 long tons) standard; 3,300 t (3,200 long tons) full load
- Length: 94 m (308 ft 5 in) pp; 98 m (321 ft 6 in) oa
- Beam: 14 m (45 ft 11 in)
- Draft: 3 m (9 ft 10 in)
- Propulsion: 2 × Kawasaki-MAN V8V 22/30 AMTL diesel engines; 2 shafts propulsion; 3,300 kW (4,400 bhp)
- Speed: 14 knots (26 km/h; 16 mph)
- Range: 4,300 nmi (8,000 km; 4,900 mi) at 12 knots (22 km/h; 14 mph)
- Boats & landing craft carried: 2 × LCVPs; 2 × LCMs
- Complement: 118
- Sensors & processing systems: OPS-14 radar; OPS-16 radar
- Armament: 1 × twin 76 mm (3 in)/50 guns; 1 × twin 40 mm (1.6 in) guns

JDS Satsuma (LST-4153) was the third ship of the Miura-class landing ship tanks of the Japanese Maritime Self-Defense Force. She was commissioned on 17 February 1977.

== Development and design ==
The Maritime Self-Defense Force's transport and landing craft unit set up a fleet in 1955 with six general-purpose landing craft (LCUs) and 29 mobile landing craft (LCMs) provided by the U.S. Navy under the MSA Agreement. And. Subsequently, in 1961, based on the MSA agreement, three LST-542 class tank landing ships (LST-1 class final type) retired by the U.S. Navy were donated and started operation as Osumi type transport ships.

The three ships of the same type formed the first transport corps under the control of the Yokosuka District Force, but on May 1, 1962, they were reassigned under the direct control of the Self-Defense Fleet and engaged in maritime transport and maritime operation transport. It was an extremely practical landing ship except for the lack of speed, but all of them were built from 1944 to 1945, and since they will reach the end of their useful life in the 40's of the Showa era, an alternative ship is needed. Was there. For this reason, the design of the 1,500-ton type (45LST), which had been built for the district corps a little earlier, was expanded, and it was built as a 2,000-ton type transport ship for agile operation under the SDF fleet.

== Construction and career ==
She was laid down on May 26, 1975 at the Ishikawajima Harima Tokyo No. 2 Factory as the 1974 planned transport ship No. 4153 based on the 4th Defense Force Development Plan, and was launched on May 12, 1976. Commissioned on February 17, 1977, it was incorporated into the 1st Transport Corps under the direct control of the Self-Defense Fleet and deployed in Yokosuka.

At the time of service, the anti-aircraft radar and 3-inch gun were not equipped, but from December 21, 1978 to February 20, 1979, repair work was carried out at Ishikawajima Harima Tokyo No. 2 Factory, and the anti-aircraft radar and 3 Equipped with an inch gun. For the 3-inch gun, the 32nd gun equipped on the escort ship JDS Murakumo was reused.

From August 10, 1993, he was engaged in the mission of the 2nd Cambodia Dispatched Maritime Transport Unit with JDS Miura and the supply ship JDS Hamana, and returned to Japan on October 6, 1993.

On August 10, 2001, the 1st Transport Corps was abolished and became a ship under the direct control of the Self-Defense Fleet.

Removed from the register on June 28, 2002. The total itinerary during commissioning reached 376,073 nautical miles, 17.4 laps of the earth.
