= Ōsumi-class tank landing ship (1961) =

Class of transport ships

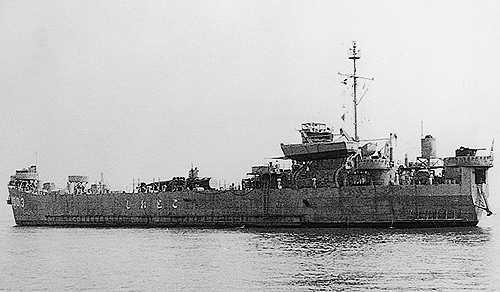
- JDS Shiretoko

Class overview
- Name: Ōsumi class
- Builders: Sasebo Naval Arsenal
- Operators: Japan Maritime Self-Defense Force
- Succeeded by: Atsumi-class tank landing ship
- Built: 1944-1945
- In commission: 1961-1976
- Planned: 3
- Completed: 3
- Retired: 3

General characteristics
- Type: Landing ship tank
- Displacement: 1,780 long tons (1,809 t) light; 3,640 long tons (3,698 t) full
- Length: 328 ft (100 m)
- Beam: 50 ft (15 m)
- Draft: Unloaded : 2 ft 4 in (0.71 m) forward; 7 ft 6 in (2.29 m) aft; Loaded : 8 ft 2 in (2.49 m) forward; 14 ft 1 in (4.29 m) aft
- Propulsion: 2 × General Motors 12-567 diesel engines, two shafts, twin rudders
- Speed: 12 knots (22 km/h; 14 mph)
- Boats & landing craft carried: 2 LCVPs
- Troops: Approximately 140 officers and enlisted men
- Complement: 8-10 officers, 100-115 enlisted men
- Armament: 1 × single 3"/50 caliber gun mount; 8 × 40 mm guns; 12 × 20 mm guns

The Osumi-class tank landing ship were a class of transport ships operated by the Maritime Self-Defense Force. It was recommissioned with the donation of three LST-542-class tank landing ship from the US Navy. Initially, it was categorized as a amphibious landing ship, but the ship type was changed on 1 April 1971.

== Description ==
The Maritime Self-Defense Force's transport and landing craft unit consists of six general-purpose landing craft (LCUs) (built in Japan by extraterritorial procurement) and mobile landing craft (built in Japan) provided by the US Navy based on the MSA Agreement in 1955 (Showa 30). It all started with the establishment of a fleet of 29 ships. However, all of these were small, had limited transport and landing capabilities, and lacked seakeeping. From this, based on the MSA agreement, three LST-542-class tank landing ships, which had been mothballed in the United States, will be provided.

The LST-542 class was the last model of the LST-1-class tank landing ship, and the displacement is increased by adding one layer of bridge and adding machine guns based on the early model, and it is also the latter model In comparison, the amount of cargo loaded has been reduced to 1,900 tons due to the strengthening of water production capacity. In addition, Ōsumi-class had three davits on each side that could carry landing craft such as mobile landing craft (LCM) and vehicle personnel landing craft (LCVP), but JDS Shiretoko has a bridge structure. There is only one on each side.

== Ships in the class ==
Ōsumi class
Hull no.	Name	Builder	Laid down	Launched	Commissioned	Decommissioned
LST 4001	Ōsumi	Jeffersonville Boat and Machine Company, Indiana, United States	11 January 1944	9 March 1944	1 April 1961	30 March 1974
LST 4002	Shimokita	Bethlehem-Hingham Shipyard, Massachusetts, United States	6 September 1944	25 October 1944	1 April 1961	31 March 1975
LST 4003	Shiretoko	American Bridge Company, Pennsylvania, United States	9 January 1945	14 February 1945	1 April 1961	31 March 1976
