= USS LST-835 =

LST-542-class tank landing ship

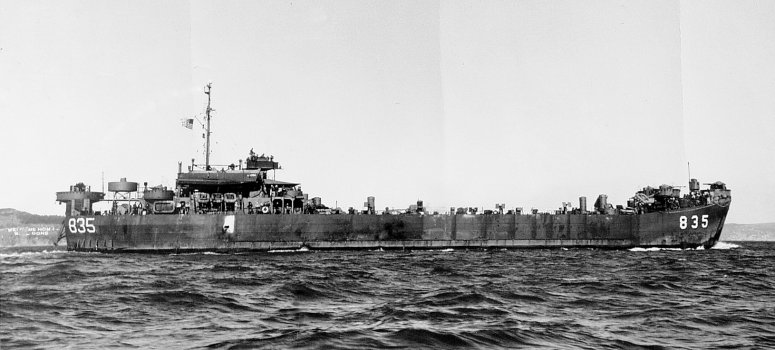
- LST-835 underway in San Francisco Bay returning home from the Asiatic-Pacific Theater, 6 January 1946

History

United States
- Name: USS LST-835
- Builder: American Bridge Company, Ambridge, Pennsylvania
- Laid down: 6 September 1944
- Launched: 25 October 1944
- Sponsored by: Mrs. I. Raphael
- Commissioned: 20 November 1944
- Decommissioned: January 1946
- Honors and awards: 1 battle star, World War II
- Renamed: USS Hillsdale County (LST-835), 1 July 1955
- Namesake: Hillsdale County, Michigan
- Stricken: October 1959
- Fate: Sold to Japan, April 1961

History

Japan
- Name: JDS Shimokita
- Namesake: Shimokita
- Acquired: 1 April 1961
- Commissioned: 1 April 1961
- Decommissioned: 31 March 1975
- Fate: Sold to the Philippines, date unknown

History

Philippines
- Name: BRP Cavite (LT-509)
- Fate: Scrapped, 1989

General characteristics
- Class & type: LST-542-class tank landing ship; Ōsumi-class tank landing ship
- Displacement: 1,625 long tons (1,651 t) light; 4,080 long tons (4,145 t) full
- Length: 328 ft (100 m)
- Beam: 50 ft (15 m)
- Draft: Unloaded : 2 ft 4 in (0.71 m) forward; 7 ft 6 in (2.29 m) aft; Loaded : 8 ft 2 in (2.49 m) forward; 14 ft 1 in (4.29 m) aft
- Propulsion: 2 × General Motors 12-567 diesel engines, two shafts, twin rudders
- Speed: 12 knots (22 km/h; 14 mph)
- Boats & landing craft carried: Two LCVPs
- Troops: 16 officers, 147 enlisted men
- Complement: 7 officers, 104 enlisted men
- Armament: 2 × twin 40 mm gun mounts w/Mk.51 directors; 4 × single 40 mm gun mounts; 12 × single 20 mm gun mounts

USS LST-835 was an LST-542-class tank landing ship built for the United States Navy during World War II. Late in her career, she was renamed Hillsdale County (LST-835) – after Hillsdale County, Michigan, the only U.S. Naval vessel to bear the name – but saw no active service under that name.

Originally laid down as LST-835 by the American Bridge Company of Ambridge, Pennsylvania on 6 September 1944; launched on 25 October 1944; sponsored by Mrs. I. Raphael; and commissioned on 20 November.

== Service history ==
=== World War II, 1944–1945 ===
Following shakedown off Florida, LST-835 loaded ammunition at New Orleans and departed there on 28 December. After brief stops on the West Coast and Pearl Harbor, she steamed for the western Pacific, arriving at Guam on 18 March 1945. For the next six weeks she transported troops, trucks, and other equipment from the Marianas to Iwo Jima. Sailing from Saipan on 25 April, LST-835 carried vital ammunition to Okinawa, where American forces were engaged in a fierce battle for control of this strategic island. For the remainder of World War II, the landing ship shuttled cargo and troops throughout the American staging areas in the Pacific.

=== 1945–1989 ===
After V-J Day she operated with the occupation forces in the Philippines and Japan for the next two months. Departing Nagoya, Japan on 8 November, LST-835 stopped for cargo at Saipan before proceeding to the United States. She arrived at San Francisco on 8 January 1946, and later that month sailed to Astoria, Oregon and decommissioned there. While berthed with the Columbia River Group, Pacific Reserve Fleet, LST-835 was renamed USS Hillsdale County (LST-835) on 1 July 1955.

=== Japanese service ===
Hillsdale County was struck from the Naval Vessel Register in October 1959 and sold in April 1961 to Japan to serve as JDS Shimokita (LST-4002). Resold to the Philippines, and named BRP Cavite (LT-509), the ship was scrapped in 1989.

LST-835 received one battle star for World War II service.
