= JDS Motobu =

1973 Atsumi-class tank landing ship

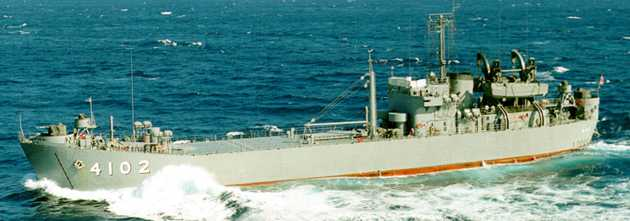
- JDS Motobu

History

Japan Japan
- Name: Motobu; (もとぶ)
- Namesake: Motobu
- Ordered: 1970
- Builder: Sasebo Heavy Industries
- Laid down: 23 April 1972
- Launched: 3 August 1973
- Commissioned: 21 December 1973
- Decommissioned: 12 April 1999
- Home port: Yokosuka
- Identification: LST-4102
- Status: Decommissioned

General characteristics
- Class & type: Atsumi-class tank landing ship
- Displacement: 1,500 t (1,500 long tons) standard; 2,400 t (2,400 long tons) full load
- Length: 89 m (292 ft 0 in) oa
- Beam: 13 m (42 ft 8 in)
- Draft: 2.7 m (8 ft 10 in)
- Propulsion: 2 × Kawasaki-MAN V8V 22/30 AMTL diesel engines; 2 shafts propulsion; 3,300 kW (4,400 bhp)
- Speed: 14 knots (26 km/h; 16 mph)
- Boats & landing craft carried: 2 × LCVPs
- Complement: 100
- Sensors & processing systems: OPS-9 radar
- Armament: 2 × twin 40 mm (1.6 in) guns

JDS Motobu (LST-4102) was the second ship of the Atsumi-class tank landing ships of the Japanese Maritime Self-Defense Force. She was commissioned on 21 December 1973.

== Development and design ==
The three Atsumi-class tank landing ships (LSTs) had a standard displacement of 1,500 tonnes (1,500 long tons) and 2,400 t (2,400 long tons) at full load. They were 89 m (292 ft 0 in) overall with a beam of 13 m (42 ft 8 in) and a draft of 2.7 m (8 ft 10 in). Ships in the class were powered by two Kawasaki-MAN V8V 22/30 AMTL diesel engines turning two shafts rated at 3,300 kilowatts (4,400 bhp). This gave them a maximum speed of 14 knots (26 km/h; 16 mph).

Vessels of the class carried two Landing Craft Vehicle Personnel (LCVPs). The LCVPs were slung under davits and a traveling gantry crane with folding rails that could be extended over the side handled the two LCMs positioned on the foredeck. The LSTs could carry up 130 troops. The Atsumi class were armed with twin-mounted 40 mm (1.6 in) guns in a single turret placed each at the bow and aft. The LSTs were equipped with OPS-9 air search. They had a complement of 100 officers and crew.

== Construction and career ==
She was laid down by Sasebo Heavy Industries on April 23, 1972, as the No. 4102 planned transport ship in 1970 based on the 4th Defense Force Development Plan, launched on August 3, 1973. It was commissioned on 21 December 1973 and was incorporated into the Yokosuka District Force as a ship under direct control.

On April 12, 1999, she was decommissioned. The total itinerary reached 345,823 nautical miles.
