= JDS Miura =

1974 Miura-class landing ship tank

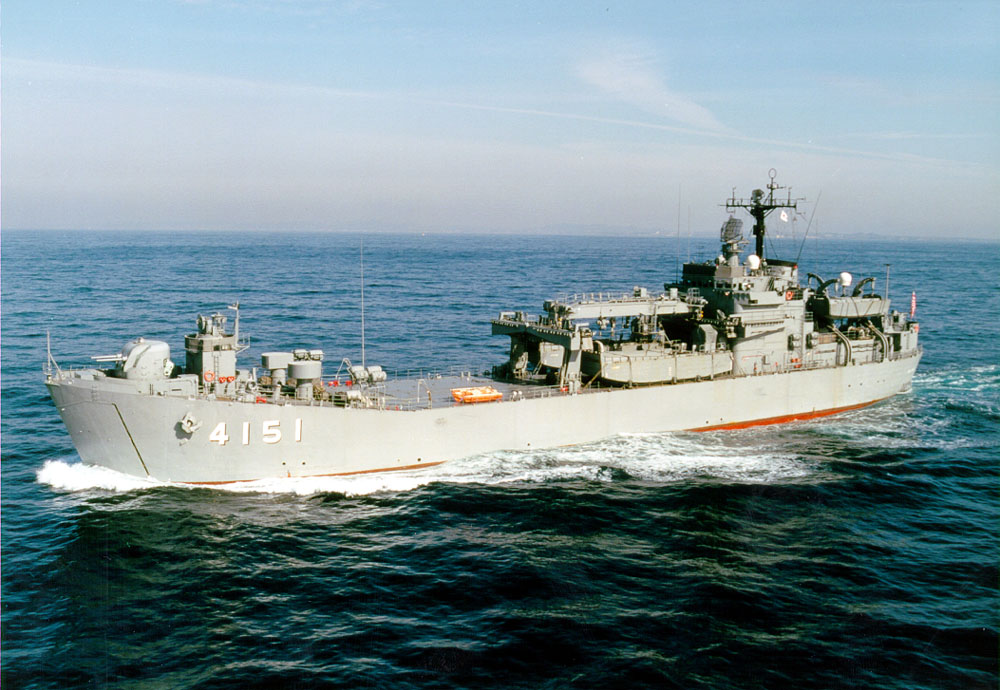
- JDS Miura at sea.

History

Japan
- Name: Miura; (みうら)
- Namesake: Miura
- Builder: Ishikawajima-Harima Heavy Industries
- Laid down: 26 November 1973
- Launched: 13 August 1974
- Commissioned: 29 January 1975
- Decommissioned: 7 April 2000
- Home port: Yokosuka
- Identification: LST-4151
- Status: Decommissioned

General characteristics
- Class & type: Miura-class tank landing ship
- Displacement: 2,000 t (2,000 long tons) standard; 3,300 t (3,200 long tons) full load
- Length: 94 m (308 ft 5 in) pp; 98 m (321 ft 6 in) oa
- Beam: 14 m (45 ft 11 in)
- Draft: 3 m (9 ft 10 in)
- Propulsion: 2 × Kawasaki-MAN V8V 22/30 AMTL diesel engines; 2 shafts propulsion; 3,300 kW (4,400 bhp)
- Speed: 14 knots (26 km/h; 16 mph)
- Range: 4,300 nmi (8,000 km; 4,900 mi) at 12 knots (22 km/h; 14 mph)
- Boats & landing craft carried: 2 × LCVPs; 2 × LCMs
- Complement: 118
- Sensors & processing systems: OPS-14 radar; OPS-16 radar
- Armament: 1 × twin 76 mm (3 in)/50 guns; 1 × twin 40 mm (1.6 in) guns

JDS Miura (LST-4151) was the lead ship of the Miura-class landing ship tanks of the Japanese Maritime Self-Defense Force. She was commissioned on 29 January 1975.

== Development and design ==
The Maritime Self-Defense Force's transport and landing craft unit set up a fleet in 1955 with six general-purpose landing craft (LCUs) and 29 mobile landing craft (LCMs) provided by the U.S. Navy under the MSA Agreement. And. Subsequently, in 1961, based on the MSA agreement, three LST-542 class tank landing ships (LST-1 class final type) retired by the U.S. Navy were donated and started operation as Osumi type transport ships.

The three ships of the same type formed the first transport corps under the control of the Yokosuka District Force, but on May 1, 1962, they were reassigned under the direct control of the Self-Defense Fleet and engaged in maritime transport and maritime operation transport. It was an extremely practical landing ship except for the lack of speed, but all of them were built from 1944 to 1945, and since they will reach the end of their useful life in the 40's of the Showa era, an alternative ship is needed. Was there. For this reason, the design of the 1,500-ton type (45LST), which had been built for the district corps a little earlier, was expanded, and it was built as a 2,000-ton type transport ship for agile operation under the SDF fleet.

== Construction and career ==
She was laid down on November 26, 1973, at the Ishikawajima Harima Tokyo No. 2 Factory as the 1972 planned transport ship No. 4151 based on the 4th Defense Force Development Plan, launched on August 13, 1975. Commissioned on January 29, 2014, it was incorporated into the 1st Transport Corps under the direct control of the Self-Defense Fleet and deployed in Yokosuka.

In 1992, a Cambodian dispatched maritime transport supply unit was formed to dispatch the Self-Defense Forces to Cambodia, loaded with personnel and vehicles, and departed Yokosuka with JDS Ojika on September 17, 1992. They joined and arrived at the port of Sihanukville in Cambodia on October 2. Returned to Yokosuka on December 26.

From August 10, 1993, he was engaged in the mission of the 2nd Cambodia Dispatched Maritime Transport Unit with JDS Satsuma and JDS Hamana, and returned to Japan on October 6, 1993.

On February 13, 1998, it was transferred to the Yokosuka District Force as a ship under direct control in place of the retired JDS Atsumi.

She was decommissioned on April 7, 2000. The total itinerary during commissioning reached 379,719 nautical miles and 17.6 laps of the earth.

== Gallery ==
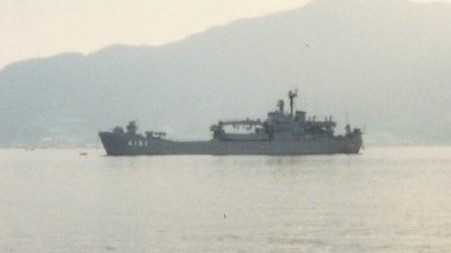
JDS Miura anchored off Yokohama on 30 January 2014.
