= JDS Nemuro =

1977 Atsumi-class tank landing ship

Coordinates: 43.3296242°N 145.5833526°E

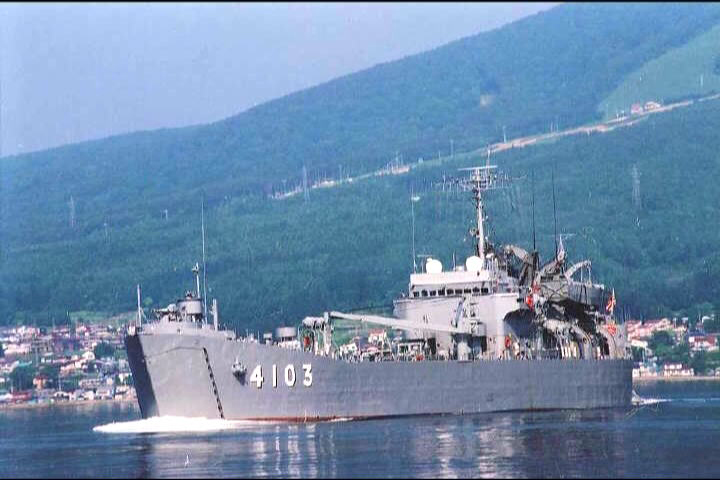
- JDS Nemuro

History

Japan
- Name: Nemuro; (ねむろ)
- Namesake: Nemuro
- Ordered: 1970
- Builder: Sasebo Heavy Industries
- Laid down: 18 November 1976
- Launched: 16 June 1977
- Commissioned: 27 October 1977
- Decommissioned: 20 May 2005
- Home port: Yokosuka
- Identification: LST-4103
- Status: Decommissioned
- Notes: Anchor preserved at Nemuro City Hall

General characteristics
- Class & type: Atsumi-class tank landing ship
- Displacement: 1,500 t (1,500 long tons) standard; 2,400 t (2,400 long tons) full load
- Length: 89 m (292 ft 0 in) oa
- Beam: 13 m (42 ft 8 in)
- Draft: 2.7 m (8 ft 10 in)
- Propulsion: 2 × Kawasaki-MAN V8V 22/30 AMTL diesel engines; 2 shafts propulsion; 3,300 kW (4,400 bhp)
- Speed: 14 knots (26 km/h; 16 mph)
- Boats & landing craft carried: 2 × LCVPs
- Complement: 100
- Sensors & processing systems: OPS-9 radar
- Armament: 2 × twin 40 mm (1.6 in) guns

JDS Nemuro (LST-4103) was the third ship of the Atsumi-class tank landing ships of the Japanese Maritime Self-Defense Force. She was commissioned on 27 October 1977.

== Development and design ==
The three Atsumi-class tank landing ships (LSTs) had a standard displacement of 1,500 tonnes (1,500 long tons) and 2,400 t (2,400 long tons) at full load. They were 89 m (292 ft 0 in) overall with a beam of 13 m (42 ft 8 in) and a draft of 2.7 m (8 ft 10 in). Ships in the class were powered by two Kawasaki-MAN V8V 22/30 AMTL diesel engines turning two shafts rated at 3,300 kilowatts (4,400 bhp). This gave them a maximum speed of 14 knots (26 km/h; 16 mph).

Vessels of the class carried two Landing Craft Vehicle Personnel (LCVPs). The LCVPs were slung under davits and a traveling gantry crane with folding rails that could be extended over the side handled the two LCMs positioned on the foredeck. The LSTs could carry up 130 troops. The Atsumi class were armed with twin-mounted 40 mm (1.6 in) guns in a single turret placed each at the bow and aft. The LSTs were equipped with OPS-9 air search. They had a complement of 100 officers and crew.

== Construction and career ==
She was laid down by Sasebo Heavy Industries on November 18, 1976, as the No. 4103 planned transport ship in 1970 based on the 4th Defense Force Development Plan, launched on June 16, 1977. It was commissioned on 27 October 1977 and was incorporated into the Yokosuka District Force as a ship under direct control.

On June 27, 1980, a Tu-16 bomber of the Soviet Air Force approached abnormally while sailing about 110 km north of Sado Island, Niigata Prefecture. The Tu-16, which was too close, crashed in front of her. The ship later contained the three bodies of the crew members.

She was engaged in several disaster dispatch activities such as the 1993 Hokkaidō earthquake that occurred on July 12, 1993, and the 2000 eruption of Miyakejima. On May 20, 2005, she was decommissioned.

Her anchor is preserved in front of Nemuro City Hall.
