= USS LST-689 =

1944 LST-542-class tank landing ship

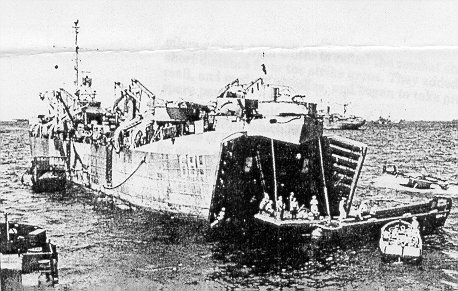
- LST-689 unloading at sea, date and place unknown

History

United States
- Name: USS LST-689
- Builder: Jeffersonville Boat and Machine Company, Jeffersonville, Indiana
- Laid down: 11 January 1944
- Launched: 9 March 1944
- Sponsored by: Mrs. Edith C. Smith
- Commissioned: 2 May 1944
- Decommissioned: March 1946
- Honors and awards: 1 battle star (World War II)
- Renamed: USS Daggett County (LST-689), 1 July 1955
- Namesake: Daggett County, Utah
- Stricken: 1 October 1959
- Fate: Transferred to Japan, 1961

Japan
- Name: JDS Ōsumi; (おおすみ)
- Namesake: Ōsumi
- Acquired: 1 April 1961
- Commissioned: 1 April 1961
- Decommissioned: 30 March 1974
- Fate: Transferred to the Philippines, 1975

Philippines
- Name: BRP Davao Oriental (LT-506)
- Acquired: 1975
- Fate: Sold for scrapping

General characteristics
- Class & type: LST-542-class tank landing ship; Ōsumi-class tank landing ship
- Displacement: 1,780 long tons (1,809 t) light; 3,640 long tons (3,698 t) full
- Length: 328 ft (100 m)
- Beam: 50 ft (15 m)
- Draft: Unloaded : 2 ft 4 in (0.71 m) forward; 7 ft 6 in (2.29 m) aft; Loaded : 8 ft 2 in (2.49 m) forward; 14 ft 1 in (4.29 m) aft
- Propulsion: 2 × General Motors 12-567 diesel engines, two shafts, twin rudders
- Speed: 12 knots (22 km/h; 14 mph)
- Boats & landing craft carried: 2 LCVPs
- Troops: Approximately 140 officers and enlisted men
- Complement: 8–10 officers, 100–115 enlisted men
- Armament: 1 × single 3-inch/50-caliber gun mount; 8 × 40 mm guns; 12 × 20 mm guns

USS LST-689 was an LST-542-class tank landing ship built for the United States Navy during World War II. Late in her career she was renamed Daggett County (LST-689)—after Daggett County, Utah, the only U.S. Naval vessel to bear the name—but never saw active service under that name.

LST-689 was laid down on 11 January 1944 at Jeffersonville, Indiana by the Jeffersonville Boat & Machine Company; launched on 9 March 1944; sponsored by Mrs. Edith C. Smith; and commissioned on 2 May 1944.

== Service history ==
During World War II, LST-689 was assigned to the Asiatic-Pacific theater and participated in the Leyte landings in October in the capture and occupation of the southern Palau Islands in September and October, 1944 and the assault and occupation of Okinawa Gunto in April 1945. She was decommissioned on 26 November 1945 and struck from the Navy list on 5 December that same year. On 25 June 1946, the ship was sold to Arctic Circle Exploration, Inc., of Seattle, Washington.

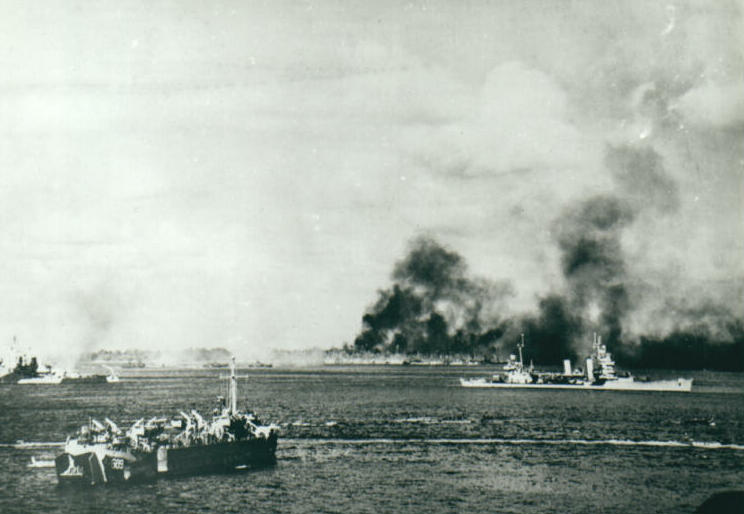
LST-689 off Angaur, with Tennessee and Minneapolis bombarding the island.

The tank landing ship performed no active post-World War II service. On 1 July 1955 the ship was redesignated USS Daggett County (LST-689); she was struck from the Naval Vessel Register on 1 October 1959.

In 1961, she was donated to Japan and commissioned as the Maritime Self-Defense Force's Ōsumi-class tank landing ship as JDS Ōsumi (LST-4001). Transferred to the Republic of the Philippines in 1975, and named BRP Davao Oriental (LT-506). She was sold for scrapping by the Philippine Navy.

LST-689 earned two battle stars for World War II service.

== See also ==
- List of United States Navy LSTs
- Ōsumi-class tank landing ship – MSDF
