= USS LST-1064 =

LST-542-class tank landing ship

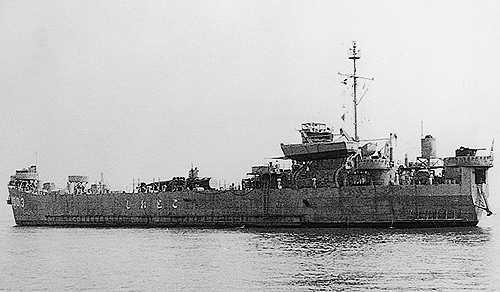
- JDS Shiretoko

History

United States
- Name: LST-1064; Nansemond County
- Namesake: Nansemond County, Virginia
- Builder: Bethlehem-Hingham Shipyard, Hingham, Massachusetts
- Yard number: 3454
- Laid down: 9 January 1945
- Launched: 14 February 1945
- Commissioned: 12 March 1945
- Decommissioned: 21 August 1946
- Renamed: Nansemond County, 1 July 1955
- Stricken: 1 October 1959
- Identification: Hull symbol: LST-1064; Code letters: NKXQ
- Fate: Sold to Japan, April 1961

Japan
- Name: JDS Shiretoko
- Namesake: Shiretoko
- Acquired: 1 April 1961
- Commissioned: 1 April 1961
- Decommissioned: 31 March 1976
- Identification: LST-4003
- Fate: Returned to the United States, 1975; Transferred to the Philippine Navy, 24 September 1976

Philippines
- Name: Samar Del Norte
- Namesake: The Providence of Northern Samar
- Acquired: 24 September 1976
- Identification: Hull symbol: LT 510
- Status: Fate unknown

General characteristics
- Class & type: LST-542-class tank landing ship; Ōsumi-class tank landing ship
- Displacement: 1,625 long tons (1,651 t) (light); 4,080 long tons (4,145 t) (full (seagoing draft with 1,675 short tons (1,520 t) load); 2,366 long tons (2,404 t) (beaching)
- Length: 328 ft (100 m) oa
- Beam: 50 ft (15 m)
- Draft: Unloaded: 2 ft 4 in (0.71 m) forward; 7 ft 6 in (2.29 m) aft; Full load: 8 ft 3 in (2.51 m) forward; 14 ft 1 in (4.29 m) aft; Landing with 500 short tons (450 t) load: 3 ft 11 in (1.19 m) forward; 9 ft 10 in (3.00 m) aft; Limiting 11 ft 2 in (3.40 m); Maximum navigation 14 ft 1 in (4.29 m)
- Installed power: 2 × 900 hp (670 kW) Electro-Motive Diesel 12-567A diesel engines; 1,800 shp (1,300 kW)
- Propulsion: 1 × Falk main reduction gears; 2 × Propellers
- Speed: 11.6 kn (21.5 km/h; 13.3 mph)
- Range: 24,000 nmi (44,000 km; 28,000 mi) at 9 kn (17 km/h; 10 mph) while displacing 3,960 long tons (4,024 t)
- Boats & landing craft carried: 2 x LCVPs
- Capacity: 1,600–1,900 short tons (3,200,000–3,800,000 lb; 1,500,000–1,700,000 kg) cargo depending on mission
- Troops: 16 officers, 147 enlisted men
- Complement: 13 officers, 104 enlisted men
- Armament: Varied, ultimate armament; 2 × twin 40 mm (1.57 in) Bofors guns; 4 × single 40 mm Bofors guns; 12 × 20 mm (0.79 in) Oerlikon cannons

Service record
- Part of: LST Flotilla 33
- Awards: American Campaign Medal; Asiatic–Pacific Campaign Medal; World War II Victory Medal; Navy Occupation Service Medal w/Asia Clasp

USS LST-1064 was an LST-542-class tank landing ship in the United States Navy. Like many of her class, she was not named and is properly referred to by her hull designation. She was later named Nansemond County, but never saw active service under that name.

== Construction ==
She was laid down on 9 January 1945, at Hingham, Massachusetts, by the Bethlehem-Hingham Shipyard; launched on 14 February 1945; and commissioned on 12 March 1945.

== Service history ==
Following a shakedown in the Chesapeake Bay area, LST-1064 loaded a cargo of ammunition at Naval Weapons Station Earle, New Jersey, and sailed for the Pacific war front, reaching Ulithi, on 23 June 1945. As the end of the war approached, LST Group 99 advanced its operations to the Philippines, and at Leyte, LST-1064 transferred her cargo to fleet ships while loading new supplies and embarking units of an air service group destined to strengthen the occupation forces in Japan. Two voyages to Yokohama, took place between 4 October and 19 November, before arrival of orders to return home.

LST-1064 spent Christmas 1945 at Saipan; New Year's Day on the high seas, and before the end of January 1946, liberty in California. After one year of service, inactivation commenced at Astoria, Oregon, culminating on 21 August, when LST-1064 was fully decommissioned and laid up in the Pacific Reserve Fleet, Columbia River Group.

She was named Nansemond County' on 1 July 1955, after Nansemond County, Virginia, then was slated for disposal on 17 September 1959.

== Japanese service ==
The ship was purchased by Japan in April 1961, under the terms of the Military Assistance Program and sailed as the Japanese Maritime Self Defense Force's Shiretoko. In 1975, she was returned to the United States.

== Philippines Service ==
The ship was next transferred to the Philippines on 24 September 1976, and served in the Philippine Navy as Samar Del Norte', after the province of Northern Samar.

== Bibliography ==
Online resources

- "LST-1064". Dictionary of American Naval Fighting Ships. Naval History and Heritage Command. This article incorporates text from this source, which is in the public domain.
- "Nansemond County". Dictionary of American Naval Fighting Ships. Naval History and Heritage Command. 12 August 2015. This article incorporates text from this source, which is in the public domain.
- "Bethlehem-Hingham, Hingham MA". www.ShipbuildingHistory.com. 11 August 2011.
- "USS Nansemond County (LST-1064)". NavSource. 9 September 2016.
