= List of naval ship classes in service =

The list of naval ship classes in service includes all combatant surface classes in service currently with navies or armed forces and auxiliaries in the world. Ships are grouped by type, and listed alphabetically within.

== Minor surface combatants ==
=== Large patrol vessels ===
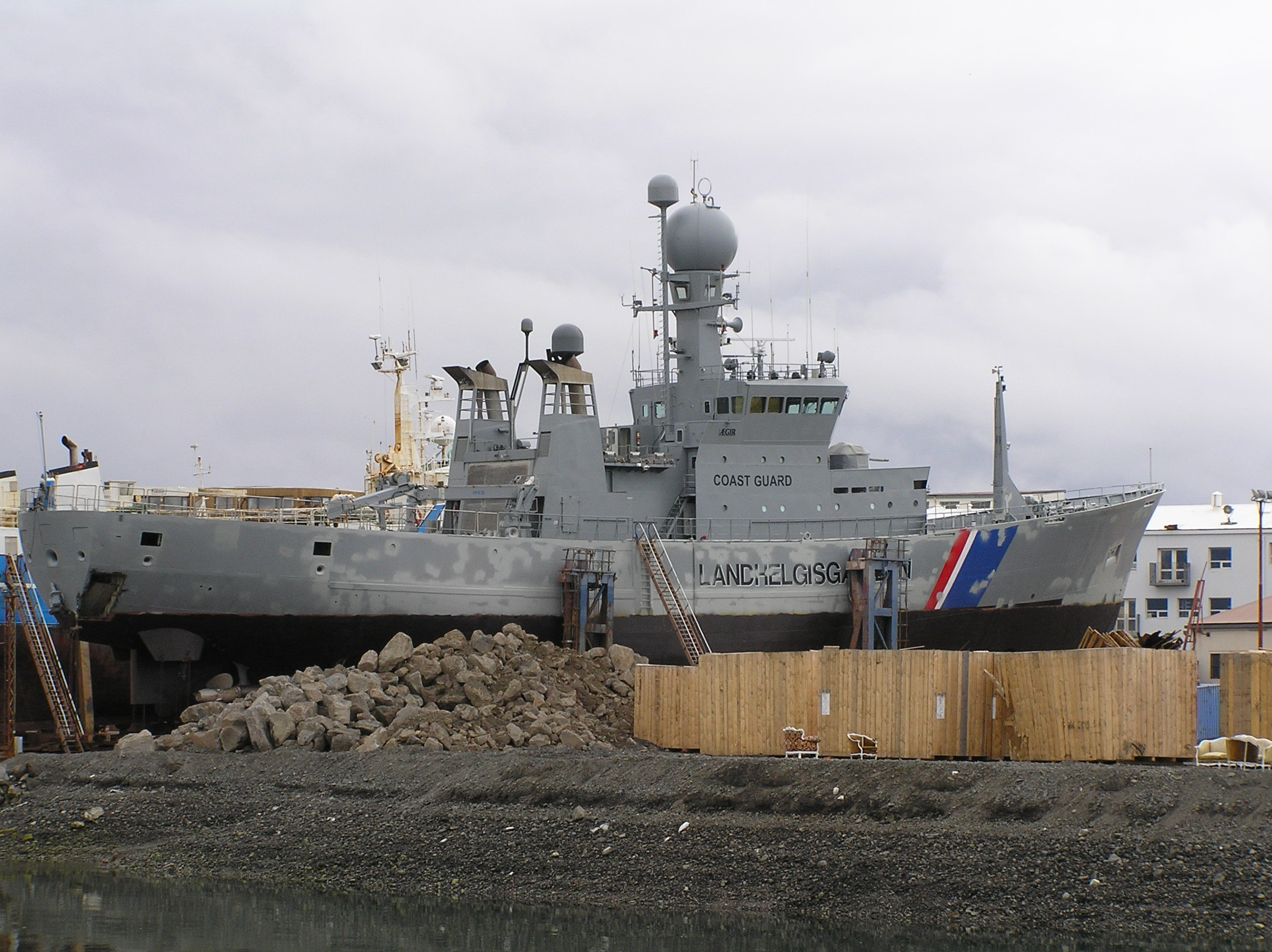
Ægir

Ægir-class offshore patrol vessel

- Builder: Denmark (Aalborg Værft a/s)
- Type: Offshore patrol vessel
- Displacement: 1,128 tons
- Aircraft: 1 Ecureuil AS350B or Hughes 500C
- Armament: 1 Bofors 40 mm gun; 12.7 mm Browning HMG; depth charges.
- Powerplant: MAN 8L40/54 × 2, 3163 kW
- Speed: 20 knots
- Ships in class: 2
- Operator: Icelandic Coast Guard
- Commissioned: 1968
- Status: In active service

Albatros polar fisheries patrol ship

- Displacement: 2,800 tons
- Operator: French Navy

Alex Haley-class cutter

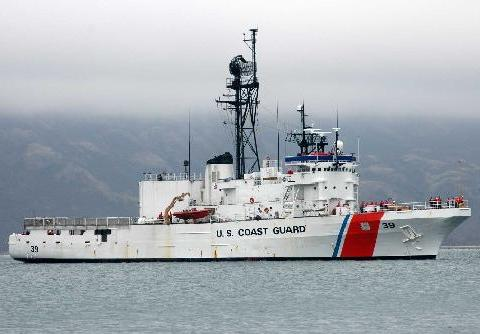
Alex Haley

- Builder: United States
- Type: Medium endurance cutter
- Displacement: 3,434 tons
- Armament:
  - 2 × 25 mm guns
  - 2 × 0.5 in guns
- Number in class: 1
- Operator: United States Coast Guard

BAM (Meteoro-class) Maritime Action Vessel / offshore patrol vessel

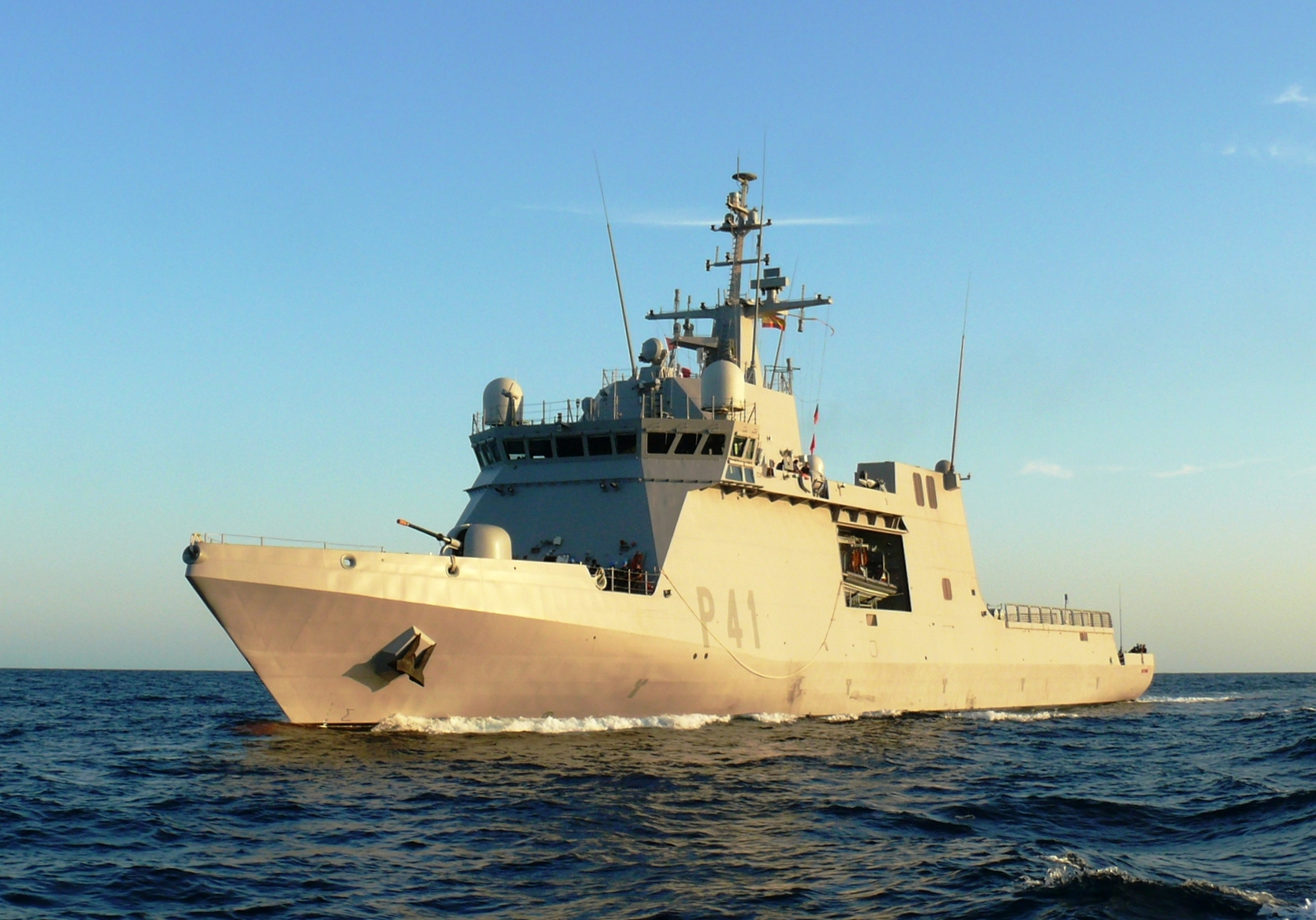
Meteoro (P-41)

- Builder: Spain
- Displacement: 2,840 tons
- Speed: 20.5 knots
- Range: 3,500 nm
- Armament: 1 × 76mm/62. 2 × 25mm. 2 × 12.7mm.
- Aircraft: 1 × NH-90 or 1 × AB-212 or 1 × SH3D
- Operator: Spanish Navy: 6 in service
- Status: In active service

Barentshav-class offshore patrol vessel

- Builder: Norway
- Displacement: 3,200 tons
- Operator: Royal Norwegian Navy: 2 in commission

Cassiopea-class offshore patrol vessel

- Builder Italy
- Displacement: 1475 tons
- Operator: Marina Militare 4 in service

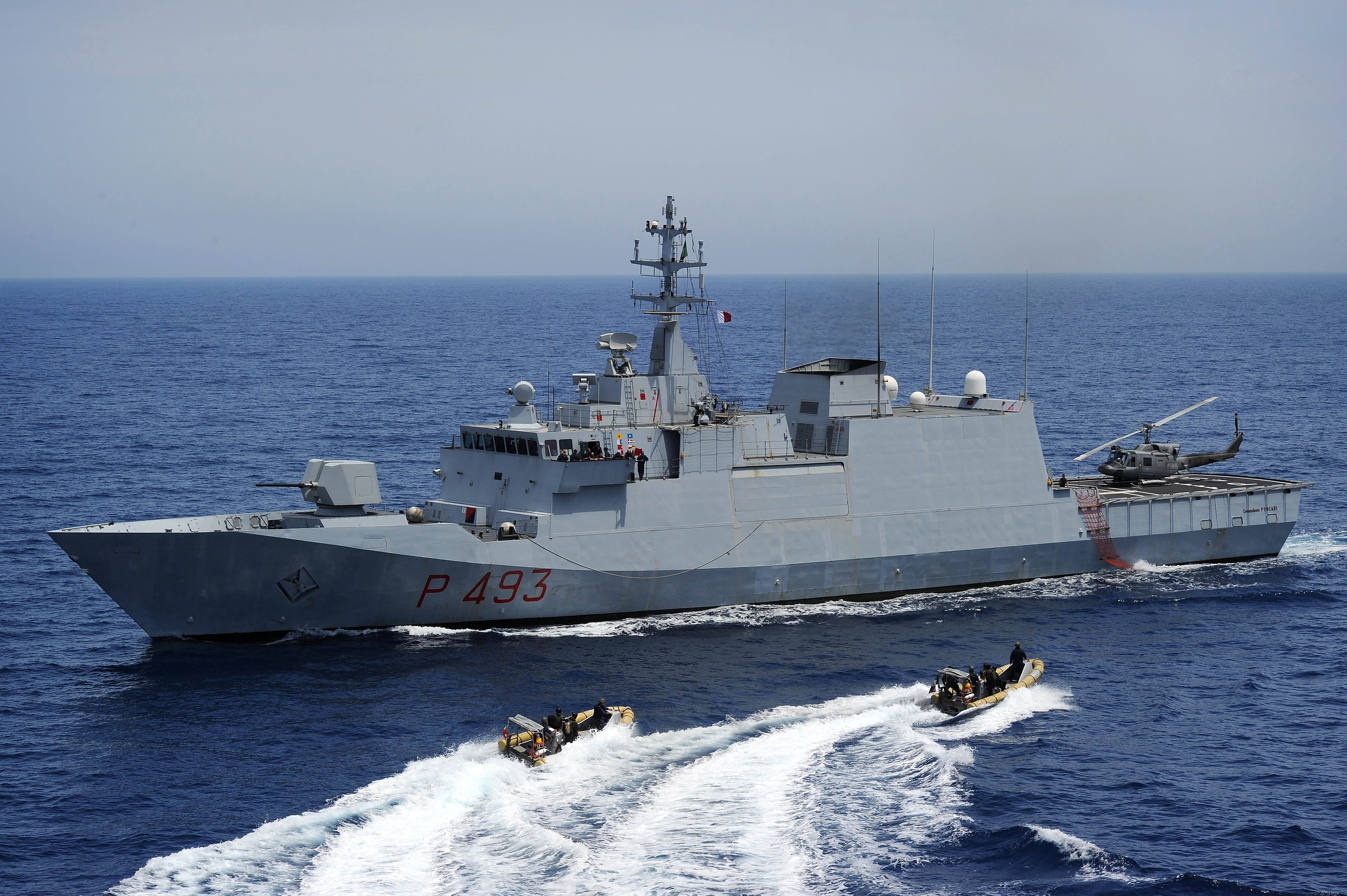
Comandante Foscari

Comandanti-class offshore patrol vessel

- Builder Italy
- Displacement: 1512 tons
- Operator: Marina Militare 4 in service

LÉ Deirdre/P20-class offshore patrol boat

- Builder: Ireland
- Displacement: 1,020 tons
- Armament: 1 × 40mm 2 × 20mm
- Ships in class: 4
- Commissioned: 1972–1980
- Active: 2 (1 scrapped, 1 decommissioned (Ireland))
- Speed: 17knts
- Range: 4000 nmi at 17 knots
- Operator: Maritime Squadron of the Armed Forces of Malta, Nigerian Navy
- Previous operators: Ireland 4 (0 in commission)

Eithne-class helicopter patrol ship

- Builder: Ireland
- Displacement: 1,915 tons
- Speed: 20+ knots
- Range: 7000 nmi at 15 knots
- Armament: 1 × Bofers 57mm/70 Mk 1 2 × 20mm Rheinmettal. 1 SA 365F Dauphin 2
- Ships in class: 1
- Commissioned: 1984
- Operator: Irish Naval Service: 1
- Status: In active service

Endurance Antarctic patrol ship

- Builder: Norway
- Displacement 6,100 tons
- Operator: Royal Navy 1 in commission

Famous-class cutter

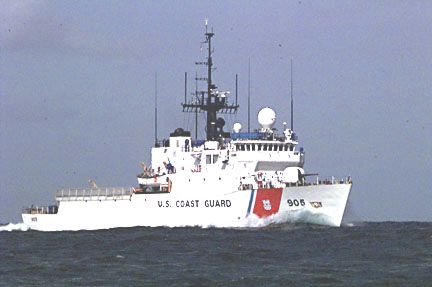
Spencer

- Builder: United States
- Type: Medium Endurance Cutter
- Displacement: 1,780 tons
- Armament:
  - 1 × OTO Melara Mk 75 76 mm naval gun
  - 2 × .50 cal machine guns
- Operator: United States Coast Guard: 13 in commission

Harstad-class offshore patrol vessel

- Builder: Norway
- Displacement: 3,121 tons
- Operator: Royal Norwegian Navy

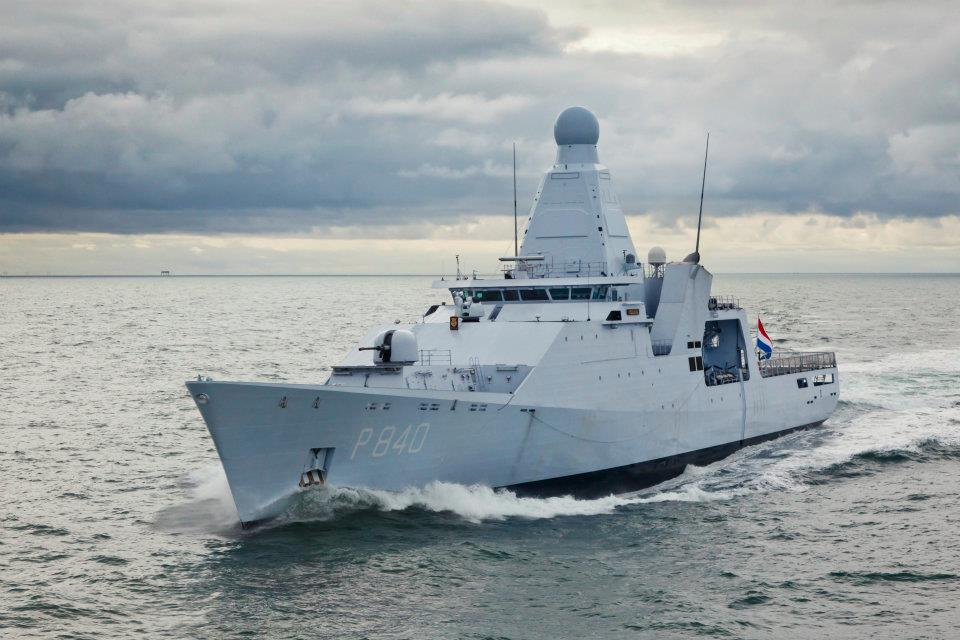
Holland

Holland-class offshore patrol vessel

- Builder: Netherlands (Damen Schelde Naval Shipbuilding)
- Type: Offshore patrol vessel
- Displacement: 3,750 tons
- Aircraft: 1 NH-90
- Armament: 1 × 76 mm Oto Melara, 1 × 30 mm Oto Melara Marlin WS, 2 × 12.7 mm Oto Melara Hitrole NT, 6 × 7.62 mm FN MAG machine guns.
- Powerplant: 2 diesel engines
- Speed: 21.5 knots
- Ships in class: 4
- Operator: Royal Netherlands Navy
- Commissioned: 2012
- Status: In active service.

Kingston-class patrol vessel

- Builder: Canada
- Displacement: 970 tons
- Operator: Royal Canadian Navy: 12 in commission

Nordkapp-class offshore patrol vessel

- Builder: Norway (Bergens mV A/S)
- Type: Offshore patrol vessel
- Displacement: 3,200 tons
- Aircraft: 1 Westland Lynx helicopter; in future, 1 NHI NH90 helicopter
- Armament: 1 Bofors 57 mm gun; 4 20 mm Rheinmetall guns; depth charges; in wartime provisions for carrying 2 Mk 32 torpedo tubes and 6 Penguin SSMs
- Powerplant: 4 × Wichmann diesel; 2576 kW each
- Speed: 23 knots (43 km/h)
- Ships in class: 3
- Operator: Royal Norwegian Navy
- Commissioned: 1981
- Status: In active service

Reliance-class cutter

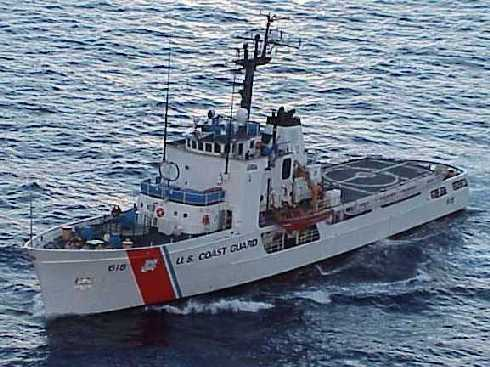
Reliance

- Builder: United States
- Type: Medium Endurance Cutter
- Displacement: 1,050 tons
- Length: 64 meters
- Range: 8,000 nautical miles
- Crew: 75
- Speed: 18 knots
- Armament:
  - 1 × Mk 38 25 mm Machine Gun System
  - 2 × M2HB .50 caliber (12.7mm) machine guns
- Operator:
  - United States Coast Guard: 14 in commission
  - Sri Lanka Navy: 1 in service
  - Colombian National Navy: 1 in service

River-class patrol vessel

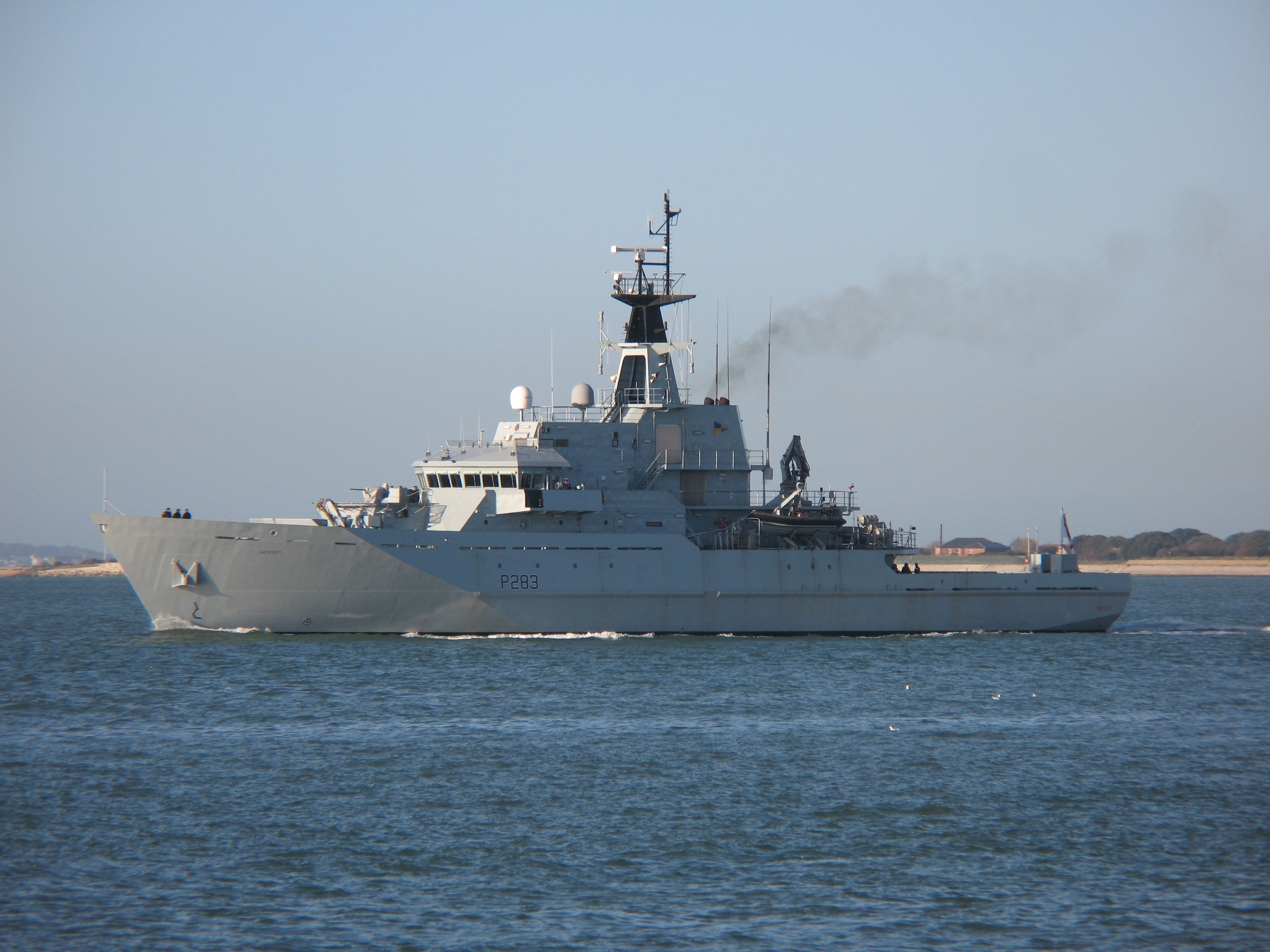
Mersey

- Builder: United Kingdom (Vosper Thornycroft)
- Type: Offshore patrol vessel
- Displacement: 1,677 tons
- Armament: 1 British Manufacturing and Research Company (BMARC) KAA 20 mm Gun, 2 GPMG's
- Powerplant: 2 × Ruston 12RK 270 diesel; 4125 kW
- Speed: 20 knots (37 km/h)
- Ships in class: 14
- Operator: Royal Navy Brazilian Navy Royal Thai Navy Royal Bahraini Naval Force
- Commissioned: 2003
- Status: In active service

Róisín/P50-class offshore patrol boat

- Builder: United Kingdom
- Displacement: 1,500 tons
- Speed: 23 knots
- Armament: 1 × OTO 76mm, 2 × Rheinmettal 20mm
- Ships in class: 2
- Commissioned: 1999–2001
- Operators:
  - Irish Naval Service: 2
- Status: In active service

Samuel Beckett/P60-class offshore patrol boat

- Builder: United Kingdom
- Displacement: 1,933 tons
- Speed: 23 knots
- Armament: 1 × OTO 76mm, 2 × Rheinmettal 20mm
- Ships in class: 4, 3 in service, 1 on order
- Commissioned: 2014–
- Operators:
  - Irish Naval Service: 3
- Status: In active service

Saryu-class offshore patrol vessel

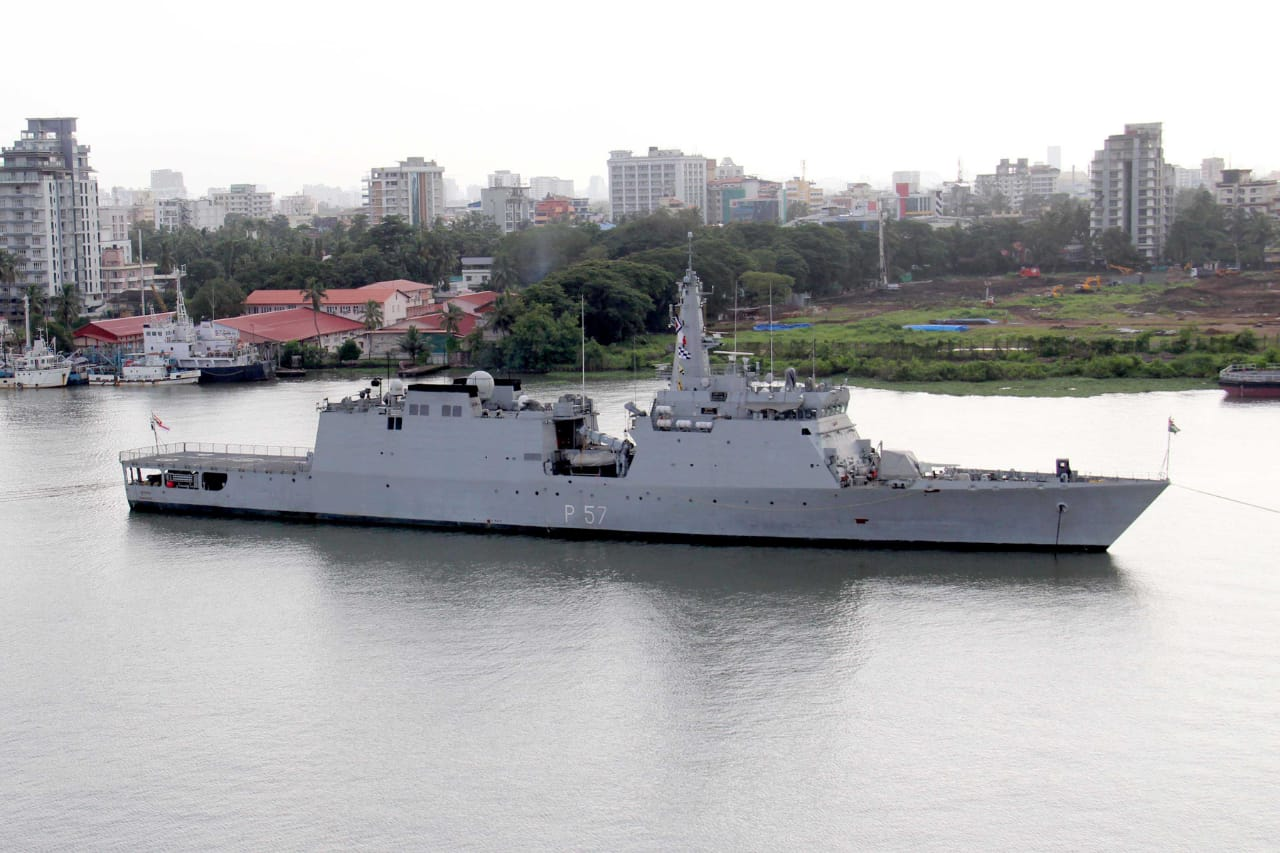
INS Sunayna

- Builder: India
- Displacement: 2230 tons
- Speed: 25 knots
- Armament:
  - 1 × 76 mm/62 Oto Melara gun
  - 2 × 30 mm/65 AK-630 CIWS
- Operator:
  - Indian Navy
  - Sri Lanka Navy
- Status: In active service

Sirio-class offshore patrol vessel

- Builder Italy
- Displacement: 1518 tons
- Operator: Marina Militare 2 in service

Sukanya-class offshore patrol boat

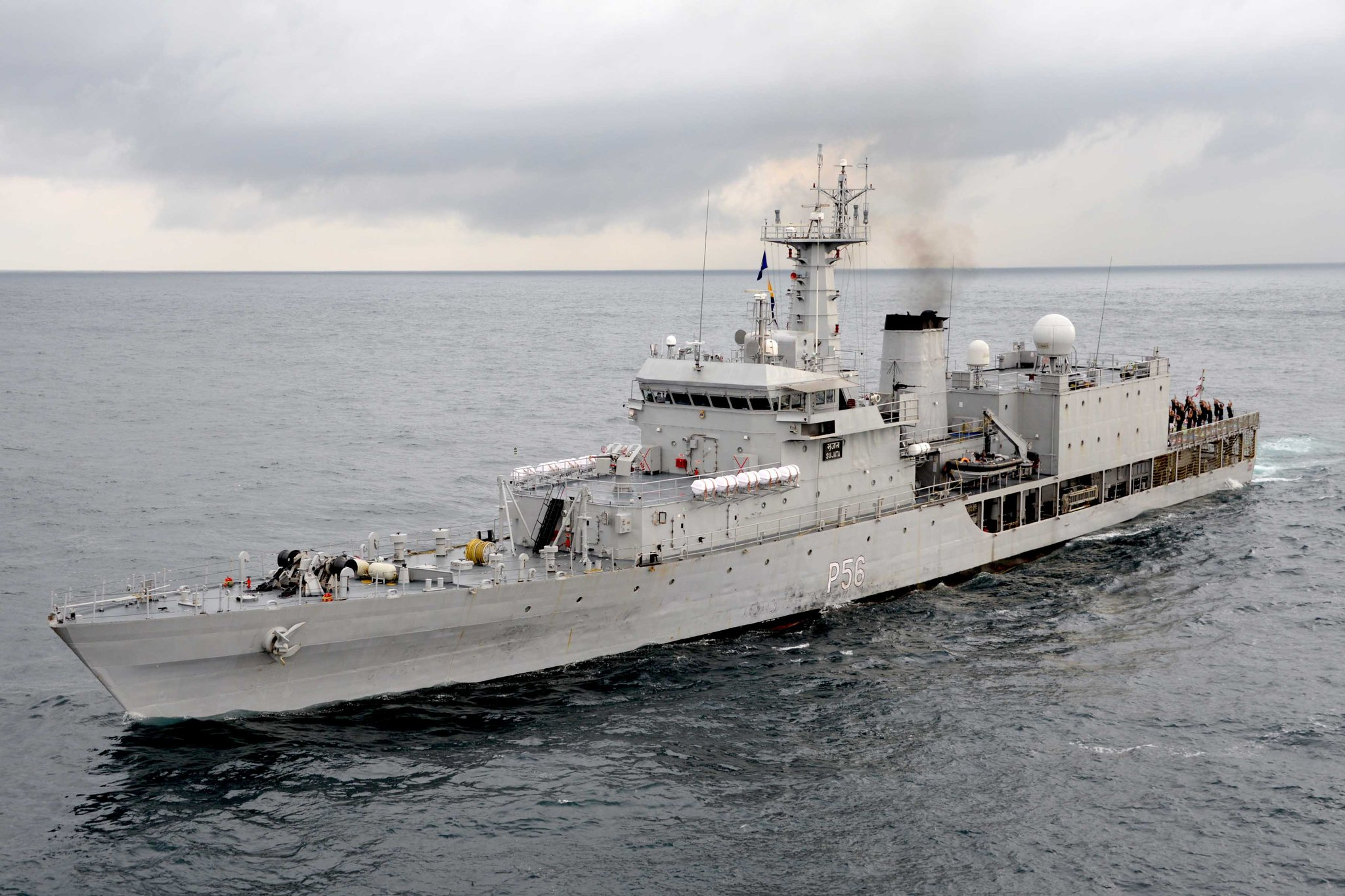
INS Sukanya

- Builder: India
- Displacement: 1,890 tons
- Speed: 21 knots
- Armament:
  - 1 × 40 mm, 60-cal Bofors anti-aircraft gun
  - 4 × 12.7 mm machine guns
- Ships in class: 7
- Commissioned: 1981–
- Operators:
  - Indian Navy
  - Sri Lanka Navy
- Status: In active service

Svalbard-class offshore patrol vessel

- Builder: Norway
- Displacement: 6,500 tons
- Operator: Royal Norwegian Navy

Viana do Castelo-class patrol vessel

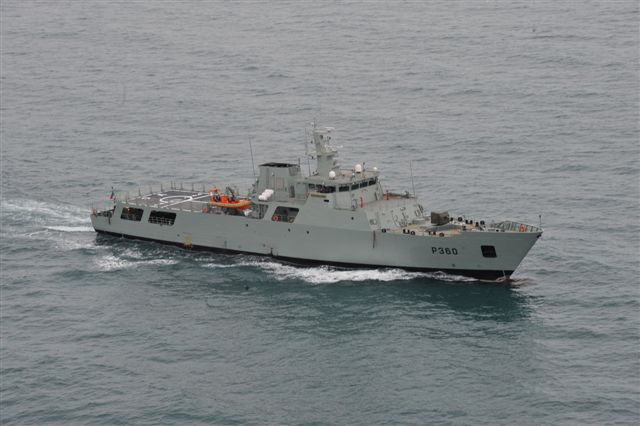
Viana do Castelo in sea trials.

- Builder: Portugal (Estaleiros Navais de Viana do Castelo (ENVC))
- Type: Offshore patrol vessel
- Displacement: 1,600 tons
- Length: 83.10 m
- Beam: 12.95 m
- Draught: 3.69 m
- Speed: 20 knots (37 km/h)
- Complement: 35, accommodation for 32 more
- Armament: 1 × 30 mm Oto Melara Marlin WS + 2 × General Purpose Machine Gun
- Ships in class: 2
- Operator: Portuguese Navy
- Commissioned: 2011

Þór-class offshore patrol vessel

- Builder: Chile
- Displacement: 3,920 tons
- Operator: Icelandic Coast Guard

=== Missile boats ===
Ambassador Mk III fast attack craft

- Builders: United States (VT Halter-Marine)
- Type: Fast attack craft
- Displacement: 500 t
- Propulsion: 4 × MTU diesels,[5] 30,000 hp (22 MW), 4 shafts
- Speed: 41 knots (76 km/h)
- Armament:
  - 1 Super Rapid 76mm dual-purpose gun
  - 8 Harpoon anti-ship missiles
  - 1 Mk 31 Mod 3 Rolling Airframe Missile launcher, 21 cells
  - 2 7.62 mm M60 machine guns
  - 1 20 mm Phalanx CIWS
- Countermeasures:
  - 4 × chaff/IR launchers (ESM/ECM)
- Ships in class: 1(4–6 planned)
- Operator: Egyptian Navy
- Commissioned: 2013–present
- Status: In active service

Clurit-class missile boat

- Builders: Indonesia
- Type: Missile fast attack craft
- Displacement: 250 tons
- Armament: 1 × 30mm NG-18 CIWS; 2 × 20mm Denel Vektor GI-2; 2 × C-705 AShM
- Powerplant: 3 × MAN V12; 1.800 hp total power
- Speed: 30 knots (56 km/h)
- Ships in class: 8
- Operator: Indonesian Navy
- Commissioned: 2011
- Status: In active service

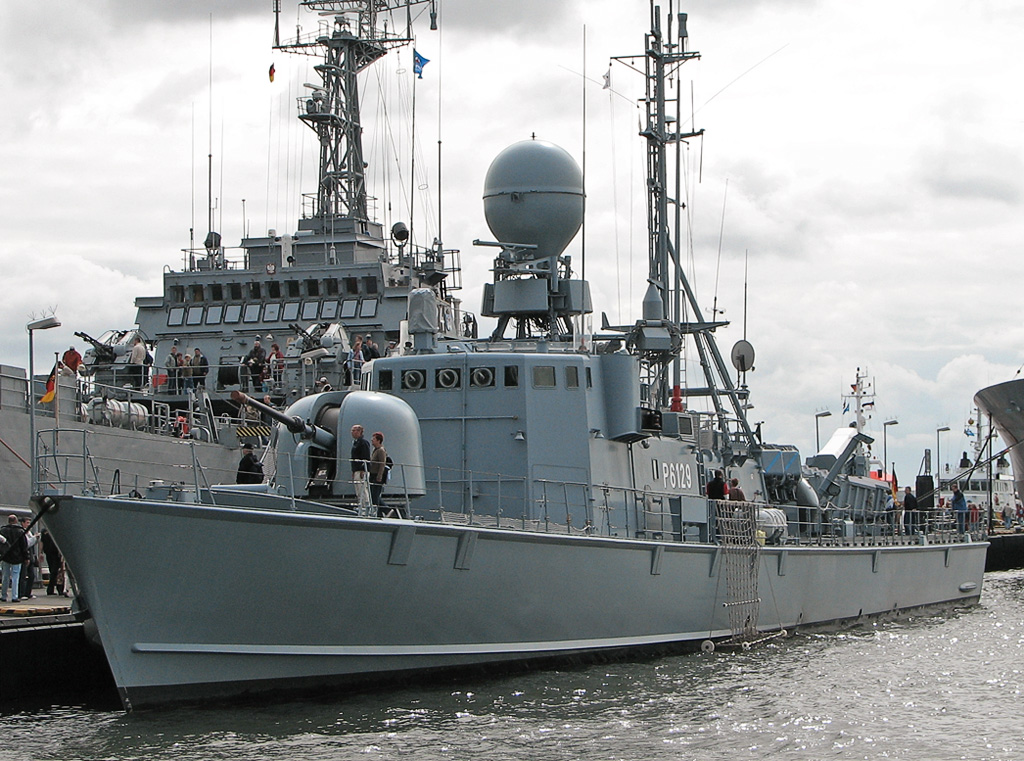
Wiesel

Gepard-class fast attack craft

- Builders: Germany
- Type: Fast attack craft
- Displacement: 391 t
- Propulsion: 13.235 kW
- Speed: 40 knots (74 km/h)
- Armament:
  - 1 Otobreda 76 mm dual-purpose gun
  - 4 MM38 Exocet anti-ship missiles
  - 1 GDC Rolling Airframe Missile launcher, 21 cells
  - 2 MG50-1 machine guns
  - Mine laying capability
- Countermeasures:
  - Decoy launcher HOT DOG
  - Chaff launcher DAG 2200 Wolke
- Ships in class: 10
- Operator: German Navy
- Commissioned: 1982–1984
- Status: In active service

Hamina (Rauma 2000)-class missile boat

- Builders: Finland (Aker Finnyards in Turku)
- Type: Guided-missile fast attack craft
- Displacement: 250 tons
- Armament: 4 RBS-15 Mk 3 SSM; 8 Umkhonto-IR SAM; 1 57 mm gun; 2 12.7 mm machineguns
- Powerplant: 2 MTU diesel engines; 6,600 kW total power
- Speed: 30 knots (56 km/h)
- Range: 500 nautical miles (930 km)
- Ships in class: 4
- Operator: Finnish Navy
- Commissioned: 24 August 1998
- Status: In active service

Helsinki-class missile boat

- Builders: Finland (Wärtsilä at Helsinki New Shipyard, Helsinki)
- Type: Guided-missile fast attack craft
- Displacement: 300 tons
- Armament: 8 RBS-15 SSM; 2 23mm doublebarrel guns; 1 57 mm gun; 2 depth charge rails
- Powerplant: 3 diesel engines; 3 shafts; 10,230 hp total power
- Speed: 30 knots
- Ships in class: 4
- Operator: Finnish Navy Croatian Navy
- Commissioned: 1 September 1981
- Status: Two ships in Croatian service

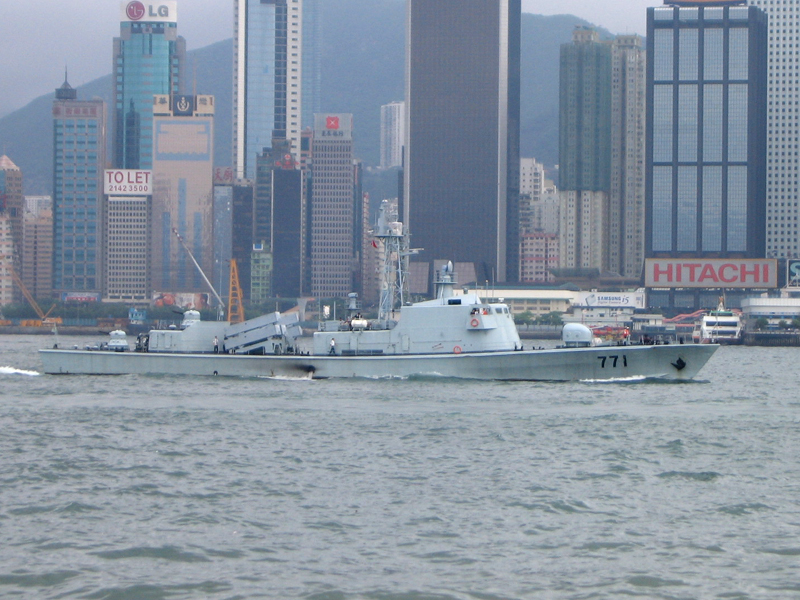
Shunde

Houjian (Type 37-II)-class large missile boat

- Builders: China (Huangpu Shipyard in Guangzhou)
- Type: Large missile boat
- Displacement: 542 tons
- Armament: 6 C-801 SSM, 2 Type 69 dual-30mm, 1 Type 76A dual-30mm
- Powerplant: 3 diesel engines; 3 shafts; 15,000 hp total power
- Speed: 33.5 knots
- Ships in class: 9 in service, 1 under construction
- Operator: People's Liberation Army Navy, Pakistan Navy (Azmat-class)
- Commissioned: 1991
- Status: In active service

Mandau-class missile boat

- Builders: South Korea
- Type: Missile fast attack craft
- Displacement: 250 tons
- Armament: 1 × Bofors 57mm/70; 1 × Bofors 40mm/70; 2 × Oerlikon 20mm/85; 4 × C-802 AShM
- Powerplant: CODOG: 1 × GE-Fiat gas turbine, 2 × MTU 12V331TC81 diesels
- Speed: 41 knots (76 km/h)
- Ships in class: 4
- Operator: Indonesian Navy
- Commissioned: 1979
- Status: 3 in active service

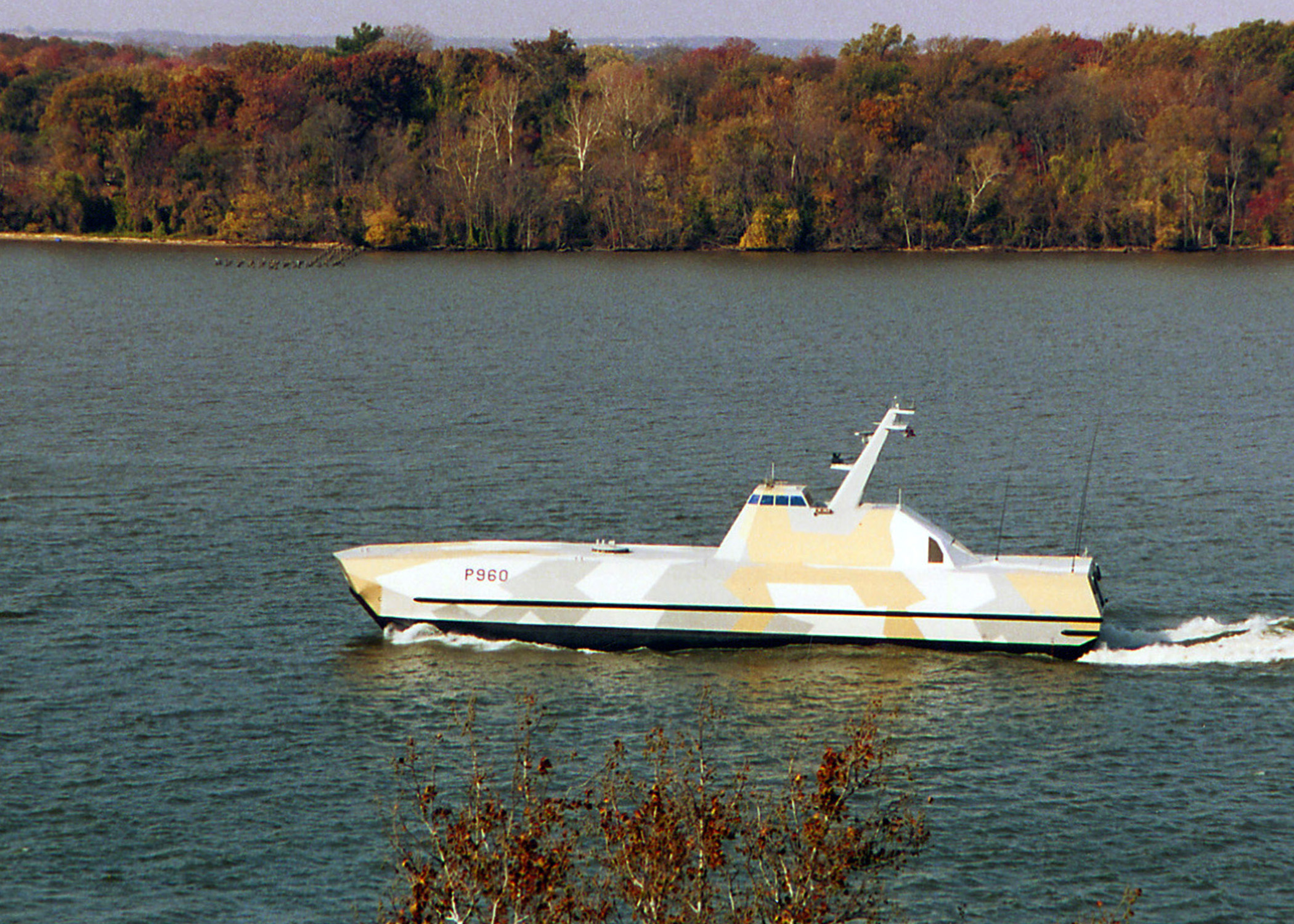
Skjold

Skjold-class patrol boat

- Builders: Norway (Umoe Mandal)
- Type: Guided-missile fast attack craft
- Displacement: 274 tons
- Armament: 8 NSM SSM; Mistral SAM; 1 × Otobreda 76 mm Super Rapid; 12.7 mm machine gun
- Powerplant: 4 P&W gas turbines, total power 12000 kW
- Speed: 60 knots (111 km/h)
- Range: 800 nautical miles (1,480 km)
- Ships in class: 1, 6 in construction
- Operator: Royal Norwegian Navy
- Commissioned: April 17, 1999
- Status: In active service

Houxin (Type 343M/Type 037-II)-class large missile boat

- Builder: China
- Displacement: 478 tons
- Operator: People's Liberation Army Navy: 14 in service

Končar (Type 240)-class missile boat

- Builder: Yugoslavia (Tito's Shipyard in Kraljevica)
- Type: Fast attack craft
- Displacement: 271 tons
- Armament: 2 SS-N-2 Styx SSM; 2 Bofors 57 mm (2.2 in)/70 Mk1 gun
- Speed: 40 knots (74 km/h)
- Range: 870 nautical miles (1,610 km)
- Ships in class: 6
- Operator: Croatian Navy: 1 in service
- Commissioned: April 1977
- Status: In active service

Kralj-class missile boat

- Builder: Croatia (Shipyard in Kraljevica)
- Type: Fast attack craft
- Displacement: 390 tons
- Armament: 4–8 × RBS-15 SSM; 2 Bofors 57 mm (2.2 in)/70 Mk1 gun; 1 AK-630 CIWS
- Powerplant: 3 M504-B2 diesel engines
- Speed: 36 knots (67 km/h)
- Range: 1,700 nautical miles (3,150 km)
- Ships in class: 2
- Operator: Croatian Navy: 2 in service
- Commissioned: June 1992
- Status: In active service

Kronstadt (Kronshtadt-class submarine chaser)

- Builder: Soviet Union
- Displacement: 320 tons
- Operators:
  - Albanian Naval Force: 1 (of 4 delivered in the 1950s)

Osa-class missile boat

- Builder: Soviet Union
- Displacement: 245 tons
- Operators:
  - Bulgarian Navy: 4 Osa II of a number delivered in service, limited operational use
  - People's Liberation Army Navy: 38 Osa I and local Huangfeng version in service of 104 acquired
  - Bangladesh Navy: 5 Huangfeng class made by China
  - Finnish Navy: 4 Osa II in service as fast minelayers
  - Latvian Naval Forces: 1 Osa I of several remaining in service as a patrol boat
  - Vietnam People's Navy: 8 Osa II in service

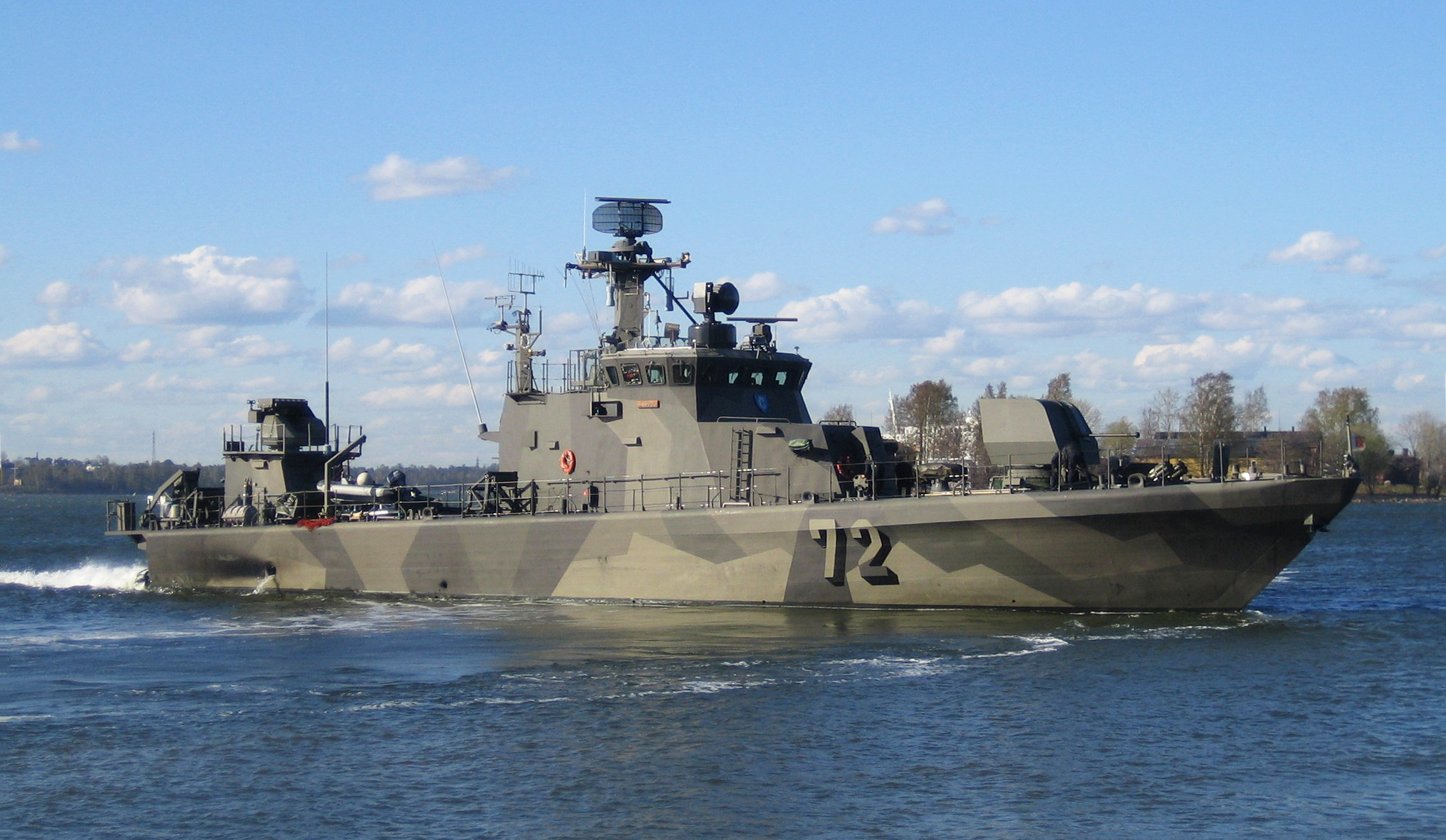
Porvoo

Rauma-class missile boat

- Builders: Finland (Aker Finnyards in Rauma)
- Type: Guided-missile fast attack craft
- Displacement: 248 tons
- Armament: 6 RBS-15 SSM; 6 Mistral SAM; 1 40 mm gun; 2 12.7 mm machineguns; 2 ASW mortar launchers;
- Powerplant: 2 diesel engines; 2 water jets; 7,510 hp (5,600 kW) total power
- Speed: 30 knots (56 km/h)
- Ships in class: 4
- Operator: Finnish Navy
- Commissioned: 1990
- Status: In active service

Sampari-class missile boat

- Builders: Indonesia
- Type: Missile fast attack craft
- Displacement: 460 tons
- Speed: 28 knots (52 km/h)
- Ships in class: 4 active, 2 under construction
- Operator: Indonesian Navy
- Commissioned: 2014
- Status: In active service

Tarantul (Project 1241.1 Molnaya)-class missile boat

- Builder: Soviet Union
- Displacement: 475 tons
- Operators:
  - Bulgarian Navy: 1 transferred in 1989 from the USSR
  - Russian Navy: 34 in service, including 1 Tarantul I, 5 Tarantul II, and 28 Tarantul III
  - Ukrainian Navy: 1 transferred in 1997 from Russia
  - Vietnam People's Navy: 4 in service

=== Torpedo boats ===
Shanghai-class patrol boat-class torpedo patrol boat

- Builder: China
- Displacement: 135 tons
- Operators:
  - Albanian Naval Force: 5 (of at least 6 delivered in the 1970s)

Turya (Project 206 Shtorm)-class torpedo boat

- Builder: Soviet Union
- Displacement: 250 tons
- Operator: Russian Navy : 2 in service of many built, plus one missile-armed variant Matka. Vietnam

=== Patrol boats ===
Agdlek-class fisheries patrol boat

- Builder: Denmark
- Displacement: 330 tons
- Operator: Royal Danish Navy: 3 in service for Greenland patrol

Archer-class patrol boat

- Builder: United Kingdom
- Displacement: 49 tons
- Operator: Royal Navy 16 in commission

Armidale-class patrol boat

- Builder: Australia
- Displacement: 270 tonnes (aluminium construction)
- Operator: Royal Australian Navy: 14 in commission

Babochka (Project 1141.1 Sokol)-class patrol boat

- Builder: Soviet Union
- Displacement: 465 tons
- Operator: Russian Navy: 1 in service, plus one modified variant Mukha

Barso-class patrol boat

- Builder: Denmark
- Displacement: 155 tons
- Operator: Royal Danish Navy: 9 in service

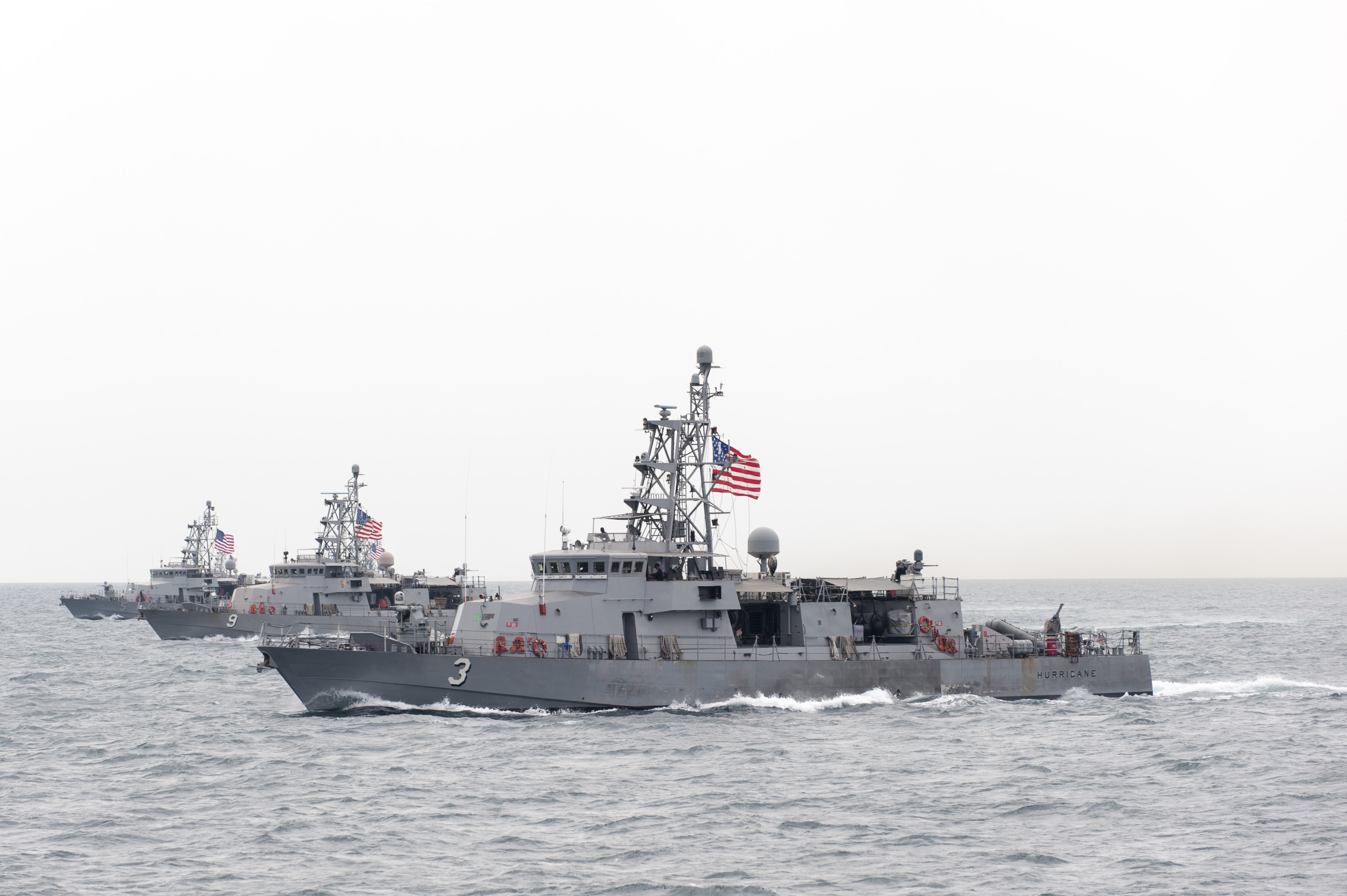
Hurricane, Typhoon and Chinook

Cyclone-class patrol boat

- Builder: United States
- Displacement: 350 tons
- Armament:
  - 2 × Mk 38 25 mm Machine Gun Systems
  - 2 × .50 cal machine guns
  - 2 × Mk 19 automatic grenade launchers
  - 2 × 7.62 mm M240B machine guns
  - 6 × FIM-92 Stinger SAMs
  - 2 × Mk 60 quadruple BGM-176B Griffin B missile launchers
- Operators:
  - United States Navy: 13 in commission
  - Philippine Navy: 3 in commission

Diana-class patrol craft

- Builders: Denmark
- Type: Patrol Craft
- Displacement: 246 tons
- Armament: 2 × 12,7 mm Browning heavy machine guns
- Powerplant: 2 × MTU 396 16V TB94 Diesel Engine @ 2.100 kW v/ 1.976 RPM with 2 × Propellers
- Speed: 25 knots (46 km/h; 29 mph)
- Range: 1,000 nautical miles (1,900 km; 1,200 mi) at 15 knots (28 km/h; 17 mph)
- Complement: 12-15 officers and sailors
- Ships in class: 6 (HDMS Diana, HDMS Freja, HDMS Havfruen, HDMS Najaden, HDMS Nymfen and HDMS Rota)
- Operator: Royal Danish Navy
- Commissioned: 2007–2009
- Status: In active service

Diciotti-class patrol boat

- Builder: Italy
- Displacement: 393 tons
- Operators:
  - (Italy) Italian Coast Guard
  - Maritime Squadron of the Armed Forces of Malta
  - Iraqi Navy
- Subclasses: Malta – P61 : Iraq – Saettia MK 4
- Total ships planned = Italy: 5, Malta: 1, Iraq: 4

Espadon 50 patrol boat

- Displacement: 410 tons
- Operator: French Navy: 1 in service

35M FPV-class fast patrol craft

- Builders: United States
- Type: Fast Patrol Craft
- Displacement: 120 tons
- Armament:
  - 1 × Griffin Missile System with two (2) quad launchers
  - 2 × SMASH 30mm Gun System (200 rds/min)
  - 2 × Mk 93 .50 caliber mounts w/ Mk 16 tripod
- Length: 35 meters
- Range: 3,000 nautical miles (5,600 km; 3,500 mi)
- Speed: 35 knots (65 km/h; 40 mph)
- Complement: 12 + S.O.F., 4 berth & 12 recl.
- Ships in class: 2 RBNS Mashhoor (12) and RBNS Al-Areen (13)
- Operator: Royal Bahrain Naval Force
- Commissioned: 2 in 2021

Flyvefisken (Standardflex 300 or SF300)-class patrol boat

- Builder: Denmark
- Displacement: 320 tons
- Operators:
  - Royal Danish Navy: 10 in service, 1 decommissioned in 2006
  - Lithuanian Naval Force: as of 2008.11 1 in service, 1 on the way + 1 optional

Fulmar-class fisheries patrol boat

- Displacement: 680 tons
- Operator: French Navy

Gumdoksuri-class patrol vessel

- Builder: South Korea
- Displacement: 570 tonnes
- Operator: Republic of Korea Navy: 19 in commission

Hainan (Type 037)-class patrol boat

- Builder: China
- Displacement: 430 tons
- Operator: People's Liberation Army Navy: Up to 100 in service, Bangladesh Navy: Unknown number

Haiqing (Type 037-I)-class patrol boat

- Builder: China
- Displacement: 478 tons
- Operator: People's Liberation Army Navy: 20 in service plus more building

Haizhu (Type 062-I)-class patrol boat

- Builder: China
- Displacement: 170 tons
- Operator: People's Liberation Army Navy: 13 in service plus more building, Bangladesh Navy: Unknown number

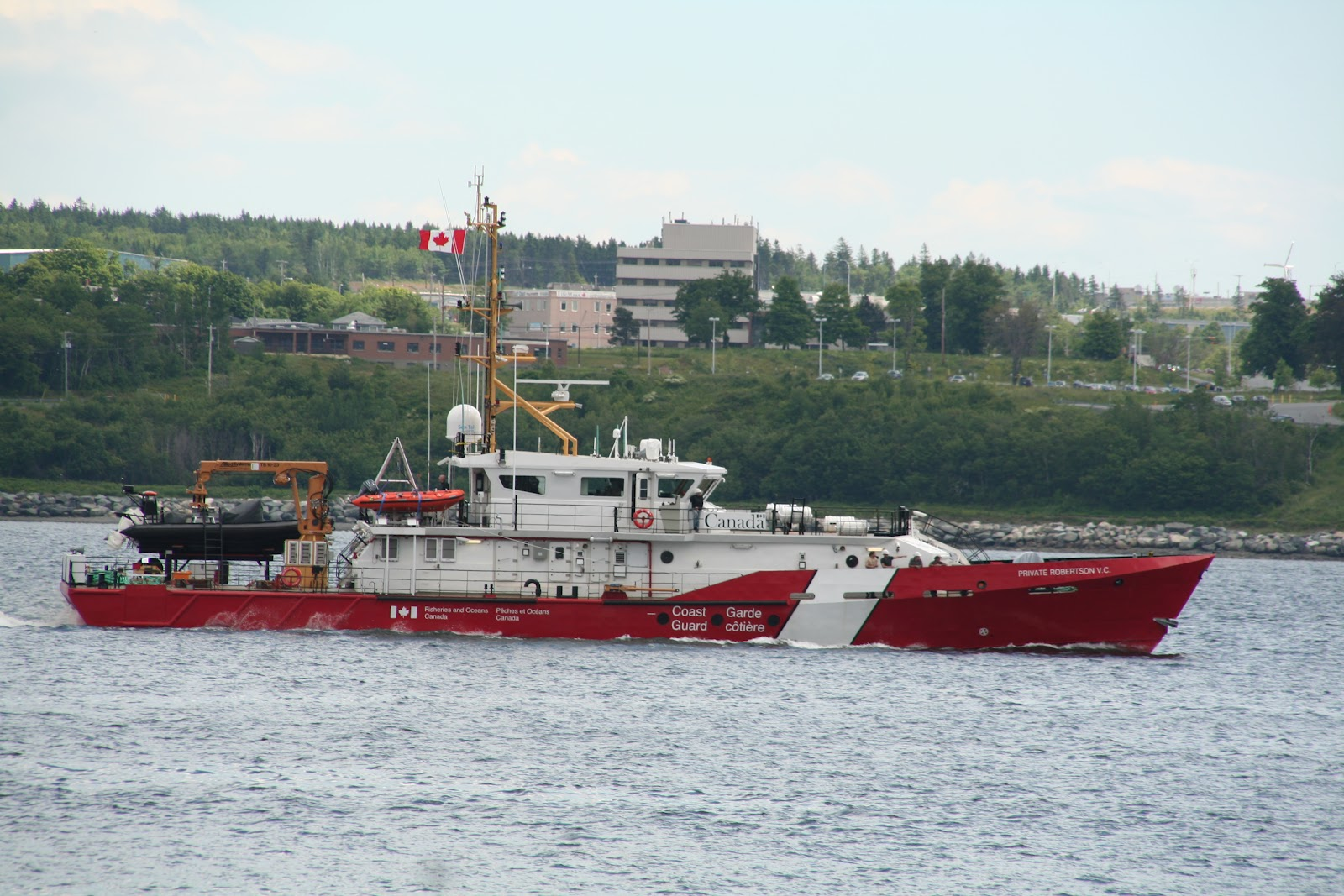
CCGS Private Robertson V.C.

Hero-class patrol boat

- Builder: Canada (Irving Shipbuilding)
- Type: Patrol boat
- Displacement: 253
- Number in service: 9
- Powerplant: 2xMTU 4000M diesel engines
- Speed: 25 knots (46 km/h)
- Range: 2,000 nautical miles (3,700 km)
- Complement: 9
- Operator: Canadian Coast Guard
- Commissioned: 2012–2014
- Status: In active service

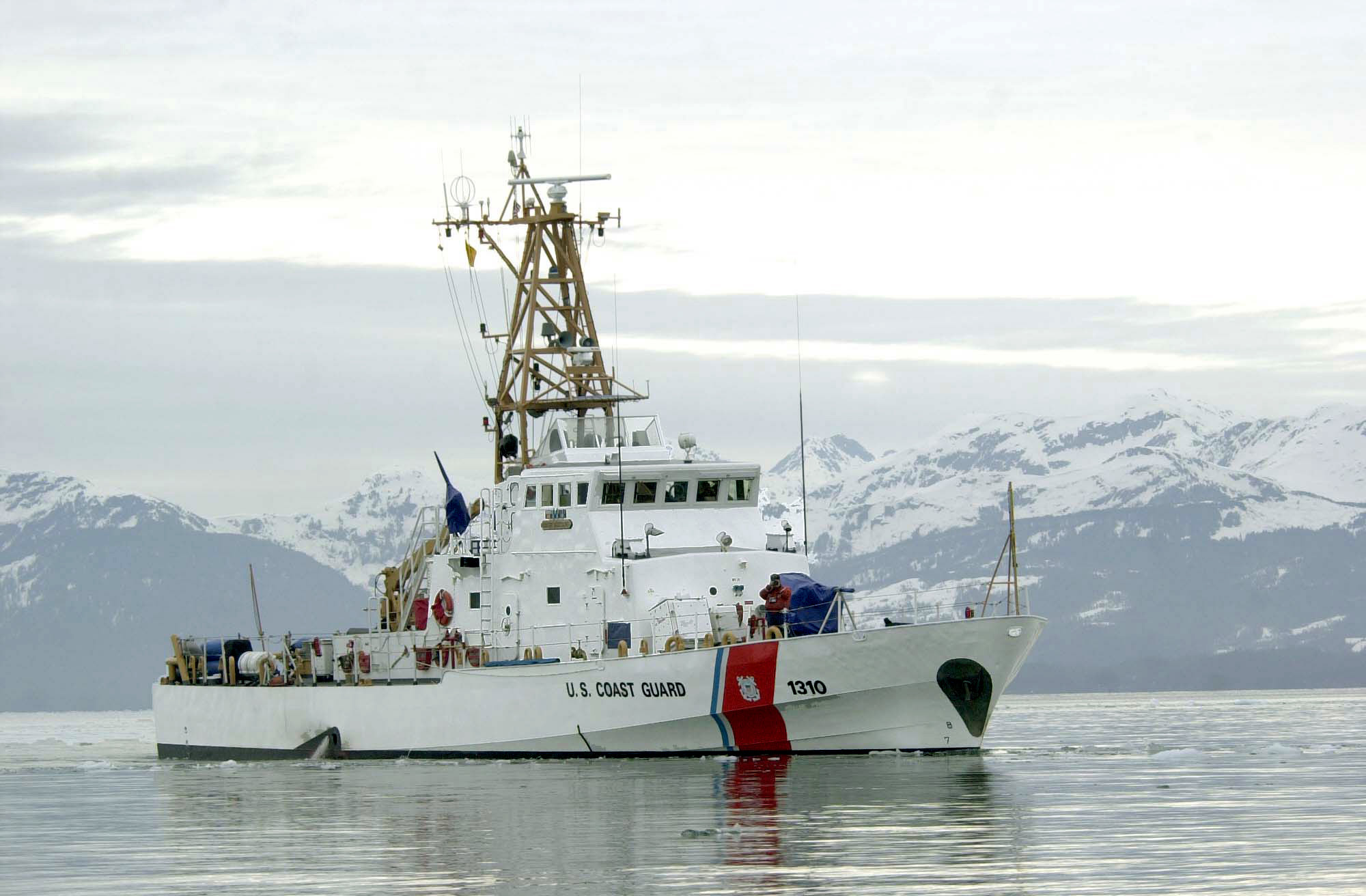
Mustang

Island-class patrol boat

- Builder: United States
- Displacement: 160 tons
- Armament:
  - 1 × Mk 38 25 mm Machine Gun System
  - 2 × M2 .50 cal MG
- Number in service: 37
- Operators: His Majesty's Coastguard, Coast Guard of Georgia, Pakistan Navy, Ukrainian Navy, Costa Rica

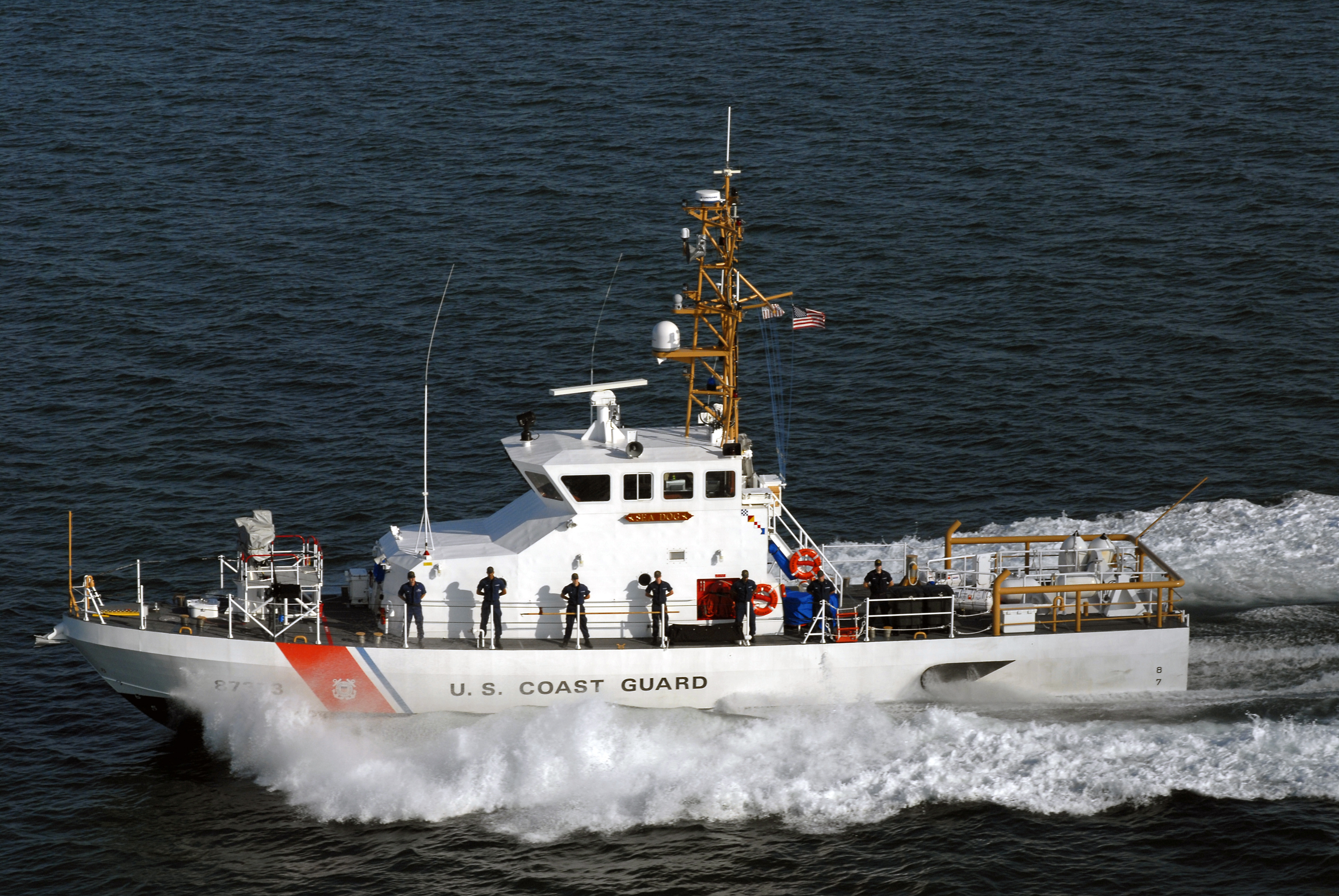
Sea Dog

Marine Protector–class patrol boat

- Builder: United States
- Displacement: 91 tons
- Armament:
  - 2 × .50 cal M2 Browning machine guns
  - Sea Dragon, Sea Dog, Sea Devil and Sea Fox are additionally equipped with:
    - 1 × remote control, gyrostabilized .50 cal M2 Browning machine gun
- Number in service: 73
- Operator: United States Coast Guard

Mirna (Type 171)-class patrol boat

- Builder: Yugoslavia (Shipyard in Kraljevica)
- Type: Patrol boat
- Displacement: 142 tons
- Displacement: 142 tons
- Armament: 1 Bofors 40 mm (1.6 in) gun; 1 Hispano M-75 four-barreled 20 mm (0.79 in) gun; 1 MTU-4 9K32M Strela-2M; 2 double-barreled 128 mm (5.0 in) illuminator launchers
- Powerplant: 2 SEMT Pielstick diesel engines
- Speed: 32 knots (59 km/h)
- Range: 600 nautical miles (1,110 km)
- Ships in class: 11
- Operator: Croatian Navy: 4 in service
- Commissioned: 1980
- Status: In active service

Omiš-class patrol boat

- Builder: Croatia (Brodosplit, Split)
- Type: Patrol boat
- Displacement: 240 tons
- Armament: Aselsan SMASH 30 mm SAM, 12.7 mm machine gun, MANPADS
- Powerplant: 2 Caterpillar diesel engines
- Speed: 28 knots (52 km/h)
- Range: 1,000 nautical miles (1,850 km)
- Ships in class: 1 in service, 4 under construction
- Operator: Croatian Navy: 1 in service, 4 on order
- Commissioned: December 2018
- Status: In active service

OPV 54 patrol boat

- Displacement: 375 tons
- Operator: French Navy: 3 in service

P400-class patrol vessel

- Builder: France
- Displacement: 375 tons
- Operators:
  - French Navy: 10 in service as the L'Audacieuse class

Pacific-class patrol boat

- Builder: Australia
- Displacement: 170 tons
- Operators:
  - Papua New Guinea Maritime Element: 4 in service, Republic of Fiji Navy: 3 in service, Tongan Navy: 3 in service
  - Solomon Islands Navy: 2 in service, Cook Islands: 1 in service, Kiribati: 1 in service
  - Marshall Islands MRA: 1 in service, Palau Police: 1 in service, Samoa: 1 in service
  - Tuvalu: 1 in service, Vanuatu: 1 in service, FSM National Police: 3 in service
  - Hong Kong Marine Police: 6 modified versions in service as the Protector class

Padma-class patrol vessel

- Builder: Bangladesh
- Displacement: 350 tons
- Operators:
  - Bangladesh Navy: 5 in service

Pauk (Project 1241.2 Molnaya 2)-class patrol boat

- Builder: Soviet Union
- Displacement: 440 tons
- Operators:
  - Bulgarian Navy: 2 Pauk II in service, delivered in 1989 and 1990
  - Russian Navy: 4 Pauk I in service plus 1 Pauk II
  - Vietnam People's Navy: 1 "Pauk" in service

Poti-class patrol boat

- Builder: Soviet Union
- Displacement: 545 tons
- Operators:
  - Bulgarian Navy: 4 of 6 delivered in the 1960s remain in service

Rihtniemi-class patrol boat

- Builder: Finland
- Displacement: 110 tons
- Operators:
  - Estonian Navy: 2 delivered in 1999

Scimitar-class patrol boat

- Builder: United Kingdom
- Displacement: 24 tons
- Operator: Royal Navy

Sea Panther-class patrol command boat

- Builder: Hong Kong
- Displacement: 450 tons
- Operator: Hong Kong Marine Police: 2 in service, built 1988

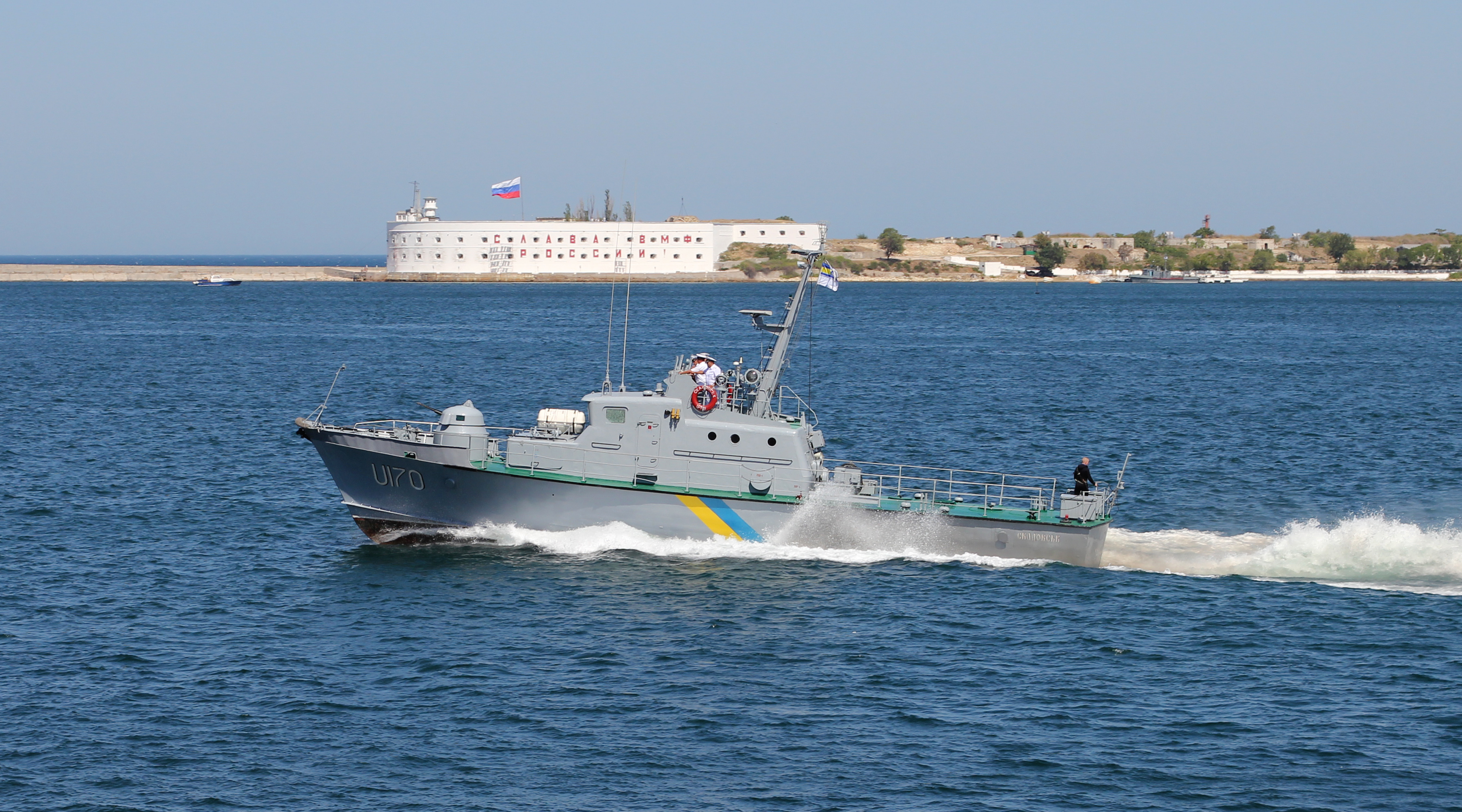
Ukrainian Navy artillery boat Zhuk-class U170 Skadovs'k. Bay of Sevastopol, Crimea

Shanghai (Type 062)-class patrol boat

- Builder: China
- Displacement: 135 tons
- Operator:
  - People's Liberation Army Navy: Up to 100 Shanghai II in service, including as many as 20 modified for minesweeping
  - Bangladesh Navy: At least 8 in active service

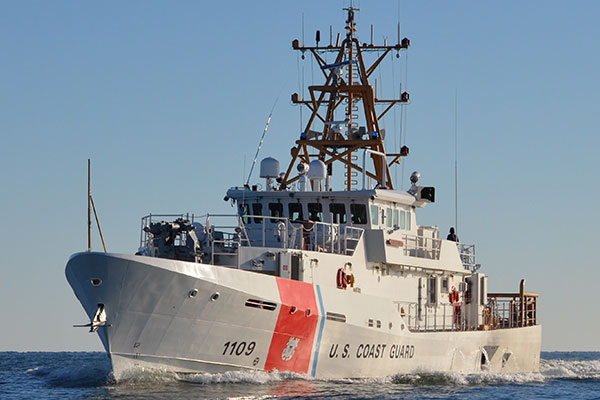
Kathleen Moore

Sentinel–class cutter

- Type: Fast Response Cutter
- Builder: United States
- Displacement: 359 tons
- Operator: United States Coast Guard

Sterne fisheries patrol boat

- Displacement: 380 tons
- Operator: French Navy: 1 in service

Storm-class patrol boat

- Builder: Norway
- Displacement: 125 tons
- Operators:
  - Latvian Naval Forces: 4 delivered in 1995, all in service
  - Lithuanian Naval Force: 3 delivered in 1994, all in service

== Mine warfare vessels ==
=== Mine countermeasures vessels ===
Avenger-class mine countermeasures vessel

- Builder: United States
- Displacement: 1,400 tons
- Armament: 4 × .50 cal machine guns
- Operator: United States Navy: 14 in commission

Gorya (Project 1266)-class mine countermeasures vessel

- Builder: Soviet Union / Russia
- Displacement: 1,228 tons
- Operator: Russian Navy: 2 in commission

Hunt-class mine countermeasures vessel

- Builder: United Kingdom
- Displacement: 762 tons
- Operators:
  - Royal Navy: 9 in commission
  - Hellenic Navy: 2 in commission
  - Lithuanian Naval Force: 2 in commission

=== Minehunters ===
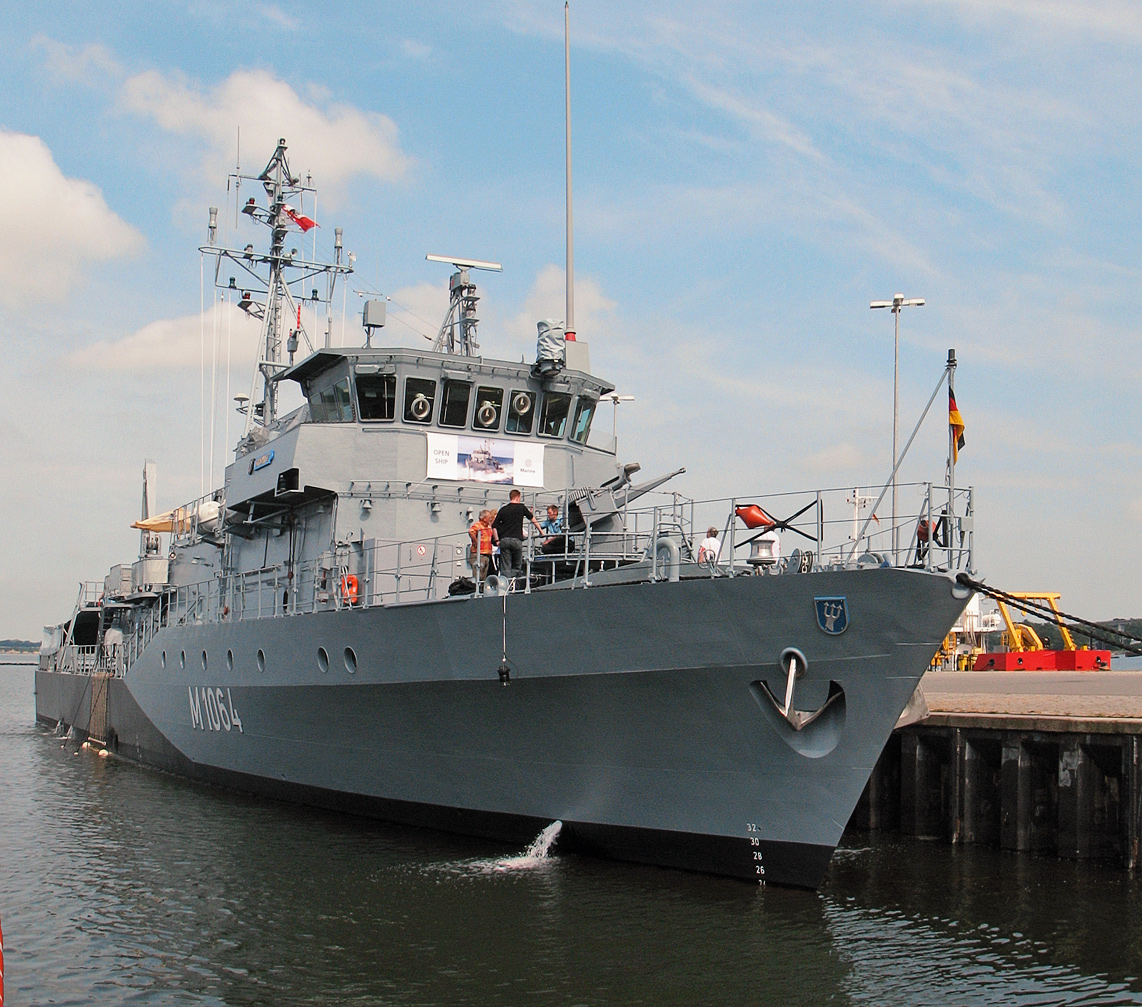
Grömitz

Frankenthal-class minehunter

- Builders: Germany
- Type: Minehunter
- Displacement: 660 tons
- Armament:
  - 1 Bofors 40 mm/L70 dual-purpose gun (currently upgrading to 1 MLG 27 27 mm autocannon)
  - Mine laying capabilities
- Countermeasures
  - 2 Barricade chaff and flare launcher
  - TKWA/MASS (Multi Ammunition Softkill System) (currently under procurement)
- Powerplant:
  - 2 MTU 16V 538 TB91 diesel-engines, 2040 kW
- Ships in class: 10
- Operators:
  - German Navy: 9 in commission
  - Turkish Navy: 6 in commission
  - United Arab Emirates Navy: 2 in commission
- Commissioned: 1992–1998
- Status: In active service

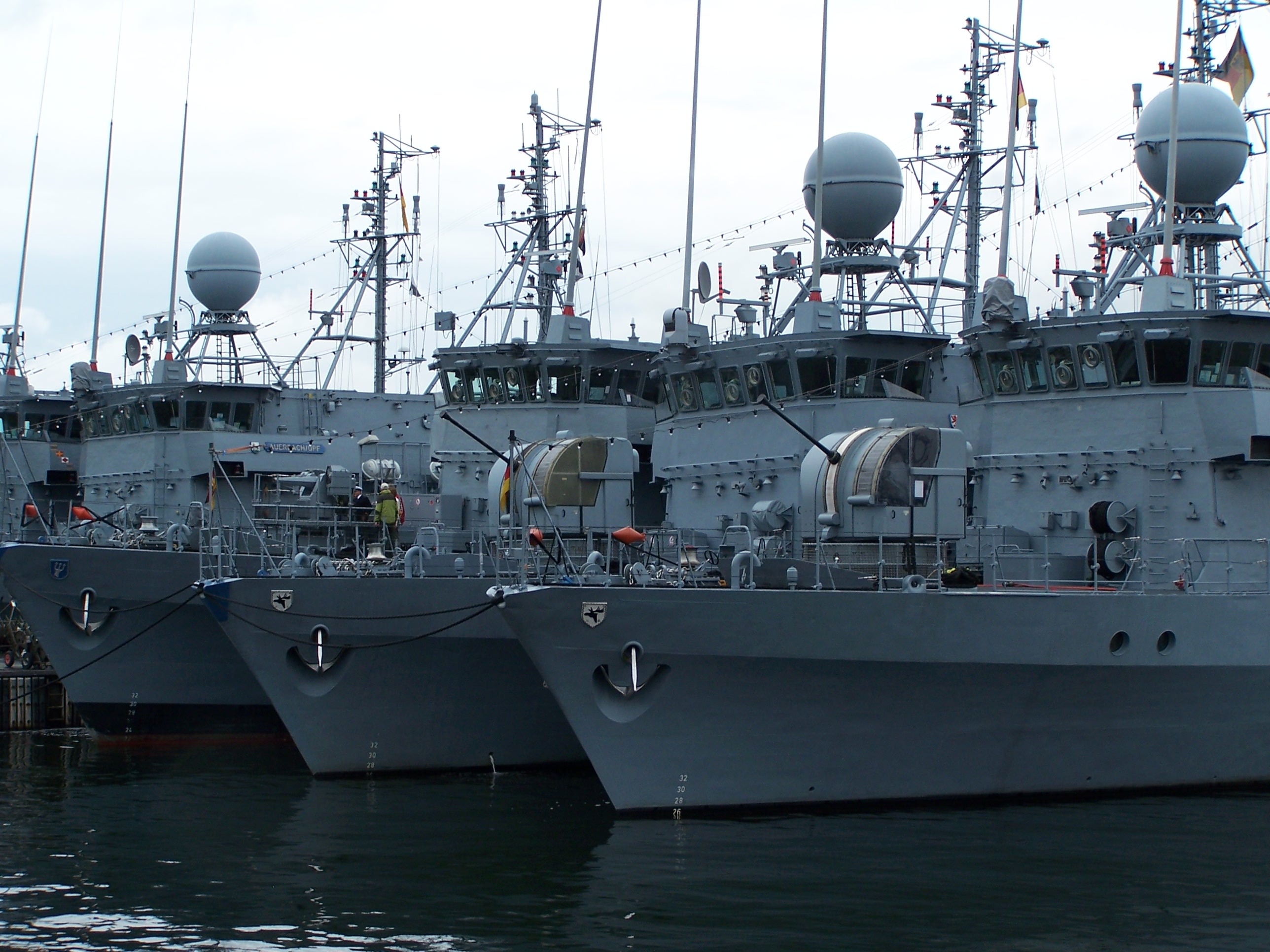
Kulmbach-class minehunters

Kulmbach-class minehunter

- Builders: Germany
- Type: Minehunter
- Displacement: 635 tons
- Armament: 2 Bofors 40mm/L70 dual-purpose guns (currently upgrading to 2 MLG 27 27 mm autocannons), 2 Fliegerfaust 2 surface-to-air missile (MANPADS) stands, Mine-laying capabilities
- Countermeasures: TKWA/MASS (Multi Ammunition Softkill System) (currently under procurement)
- Powerplant: 2 MTU 16V 538 TB91 diesel engines, 2240 kW
- Speed: 18 knots (33 km/h)
- Ships in class: 5
- Operator: German Navy
- Commissioned: 1990
- Status: In active service

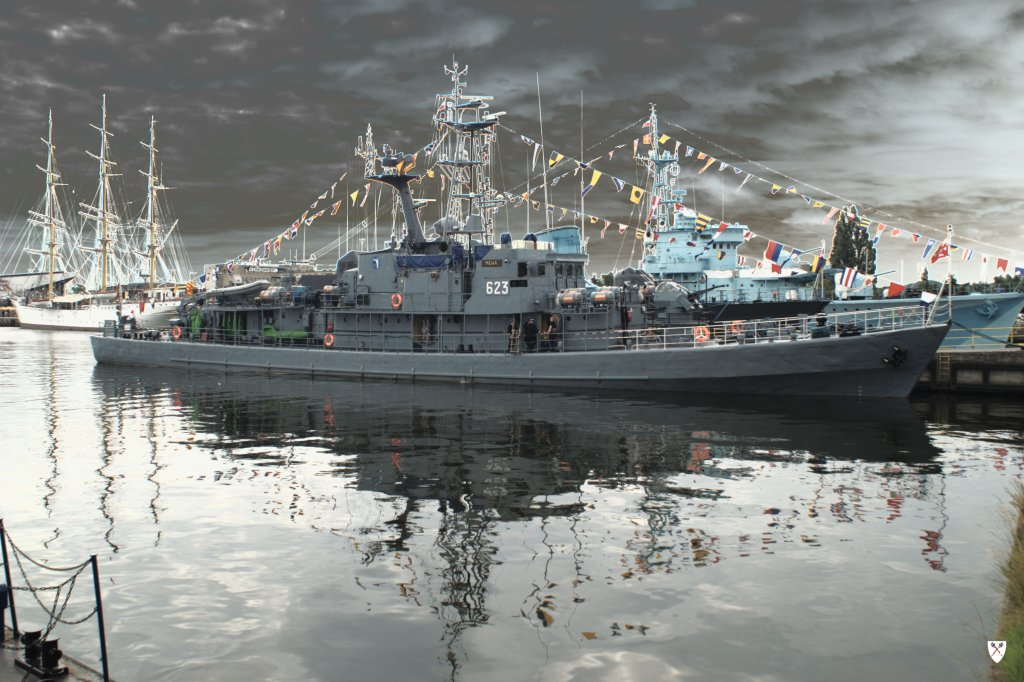
Mewa

Projekt 206FM-class minehunter

- Builders: Poland
- Type: Minehunter
- Displacement: 426 tons
- Armament:
  - 1 × 23 mm ZU-23-2MR Wróbel II autocannons
  - 2 × quadruple Strzała 2 AA rocket launchers
  - 2 × depth charge launchers (optional)
- Powerplant:
  - 2 × Cegielski Works diesel-engines, 1,700 hp (1.3 MW) each
- Ships in class: 3
- Operator: Polish Navy
- Commissioned: 1999–2002
- Status: In active service

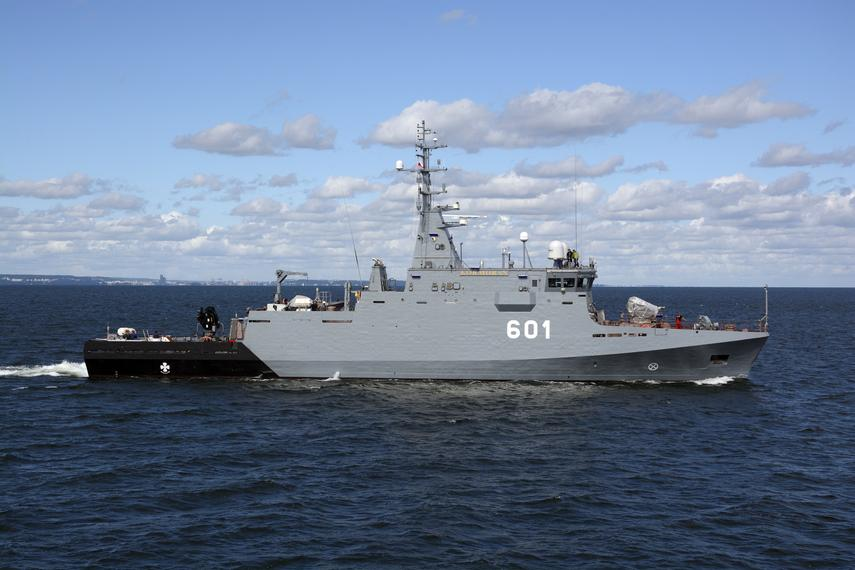
Kormoran

Kormoran_2-class minehunter

- Builders: Poland
- Type: Minehunter
- Displacement: 850 tons
- Armament:
  - 1 × OSU-35K 35 mm weapon station
  - Grom MANPADS
  - 3 × WKM-Bm machine guns
- Powerplant:
  - 2 × MTU 8V369TE74L diesel-engines, 1,360 hp (1.01 MW) each, supplemented by three MTU 6R1600M20S generators 380 kW each
- Ships in class: 6
- Operator: Polish Navy
- Commissioned: 2017–2027
- Status: In active service

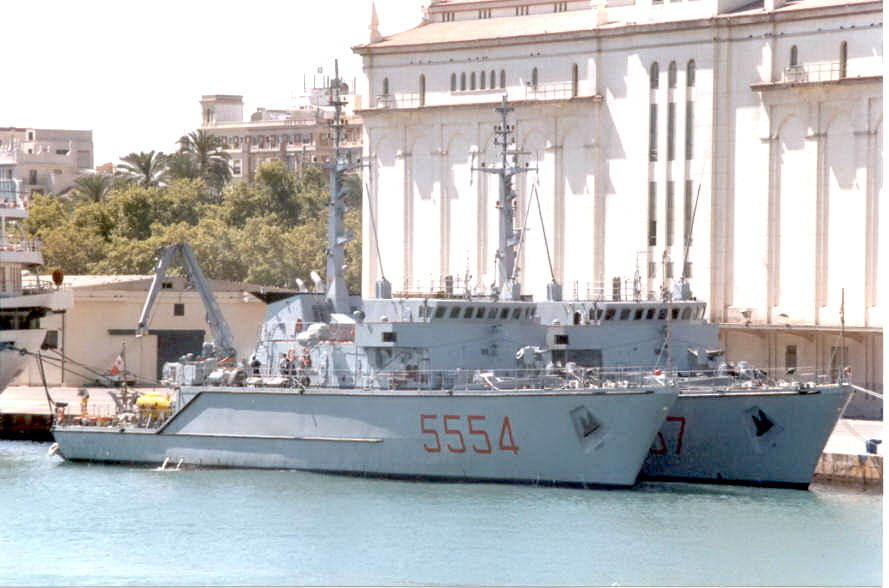
Gaeta (foreground) and Numana

Lerici-class minehunter

- Builder: Italy
- Displacement: 620 tons, 697 tons
- Operators:
  - Algerian National Navy: 1 in service, 2 on order.
  - Royal Australian Navy: 6 Huon subclass in service.
  - Finnish Navy: 3 Katanpää subclass in service.
  - Marina Militare: 2 Lerici class and 8 Gaeta subclass in service, 2 Lerici class in reserve.
  - Royal Malaysian Navy: 4 Mahamiru subclass in service.
  - Nigerian Navy: 2 Ohue subclass in service.
  - Royal Thai Navy: 2 Lat Ya subclass in service.

Osprey-class minehunter

The Osprey-class is a subclass of the Lerici-class minehunter

- Builder: United States
- Displacement: 900 tons
- Operators:
  - Egyptian Navy: 2 in service.
  - Hellenic Navy: 2 in service.
  - Lithuanian Naval Force: 2 in service.
  - Republic of China Navy: 2 in service.

Sandown-class minehunter

- Builder United Kingdom
- Displacement: 484 tons
- Operators:
  - Royal Navy: 8 in service.
  - Royal Saudi Navy: 3 in service.
  - Estonian Navy: 3 in service.

Sirius-class minehunter/sweeper

- Builder: France
- Displacement: 440 tons

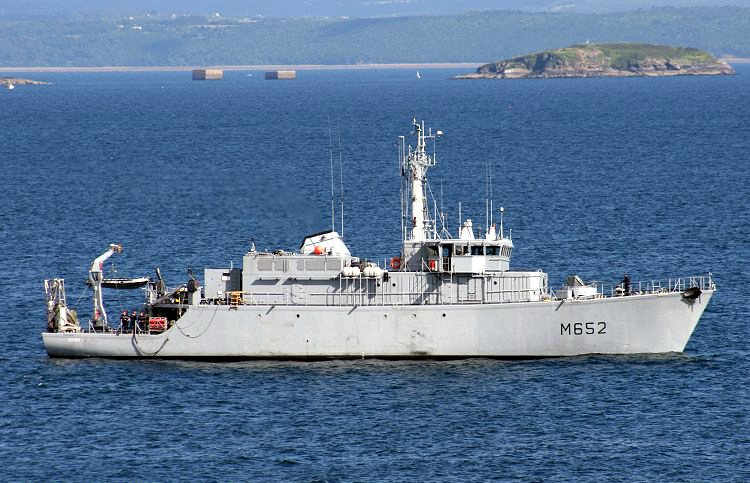
Cephee

Tripartite-class minehunter

- Builder: Belgium, France and Netherlands
- Displacement: 595 tons
- Operators:
  - Belgian Navy: 5 of 10 delivered from 1985 remain in service as the Aster class (3 sold to France, 1 to Bulgaria, 1 to Pakistan)
  - Bulgarian Navy: 1 in service.
  - French Navy: 13 in service as the Eridan class.
  - Indonesian Navy: 2 in service as the Pulau Rengat class.
  - Latvian Naval Forces: 5 in service.
  - Royal Netherlands Navy: 6 in service as the Alkmaar class.
  - Pakistan Navy: 3 in service as the Munsif class.
- Status: In active service

Type 331 minehunter

- Builder: West Germany
- Displacement: 402 tons
- Operators:
  - Estonian Navy: 1 delivered in 2000
  - Latvian Naval Forces: 1 delivered in 1999
  - Lithuanian Naval Force: 2 delivered in 1999

Type 394 inshore minehunter

- Builder: West Germany
- Displacement:
- Operators:
  - Estonian Navy: 2 delivered in 1997

=== Minesweepers ===
Agile-class minesweeper

- Builder: United States
- Displacement:
- Operators:
  - Republic of China Navy: 4 in service as the Yung Yang class

Antares-class minesweeper

- Builder: France
- Displacement: 340 tons
- Operator: French Navy: 3 in service

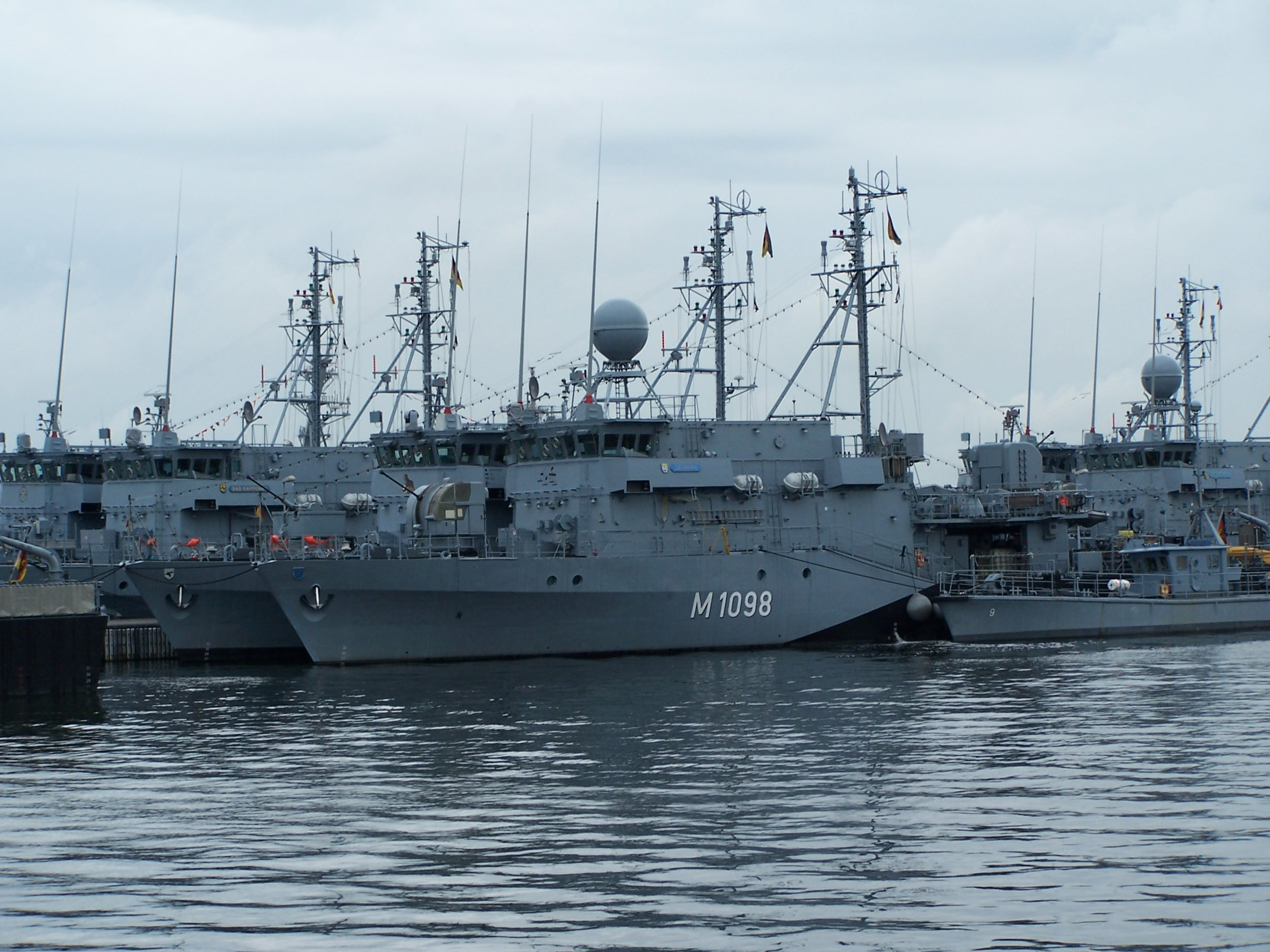
Siegburg (M1098)

Ensdorf-class minesweeper

- Builders: Germany
- Type: Mine sweeper
- Displacement: 650 tons
- Armament:
  - 1 Bofors 40 mm/L70 dual-purpose gun (currently upgrading to 1 MLG 27 27 mm autocannon)
  - Fliegerfaust 2 surface-to-air missiles (MANPADS)
  - Mine-laying capabilities (60 mines)
- Sensors:
  - Navigation radar
  - Hull-mounted DSQS-11 mine-detection sonar
- Equipment:
  - Seefuchs mine hunting drones
  - GPS-Navstar navigation system
  - PALIS
  - digital data links
  - M 20/2 fire-control system
- Powerplant: ** 2 MTU 16V 538 TB91 diesel-engines, 2040 kW
- Ships in class: 5
- Operator: German Navy
- Commissioned: 1990–1992
- Status: In active service

KMV-class minesweeper

- Builder: Belgium and Netherlands
- Displacement: 644 tons
- Operators:
  - Belgian Navy: Planned acquisition of 4 remains in question

Kingston-class coastal defence vessel minesweeper (MM 700)

- Builder: Canada
- Displacement: 970 tons
- Armament: 1 Bofors 40 mm L/60 gun Mk 5 (removed 2014)
- Operator: Royal Canadian Navy: 12 in commission
- Commissioned: 1994–96
- Status: In active service

Kondor I-class minesweeper

- Builder: East Germany
- Displacement: 361 tons
- Operators:
  - Estonian Navy: 1 delivered in 1994 (former Meteor)

Kondor II-class minesweeper

- Builder: East Germany
- Displacement: 479 tons
- Operators:
  - Indonesian Navy: 8 in active service
  - Latvian Naval Forces: 2 delivered in 1994 plus an additional parts ship

Lianyun-class coastal minesweeper

- Builder: China
- Displacement: 400 tons
- Operator: People's Liberation Army Navy: Up to 60 in service

Natya-class minesweeper (Project 266 Akvamarine)

- Builder: Soviet Union / Russia
- Displacement: 873 tons
- Operator: Russian Navy: 6 Natya I as well as 1 Natya II for trials.

Seehund ROV (part of the TROIKA Plus system of the Ensdorf class mine sweepers)

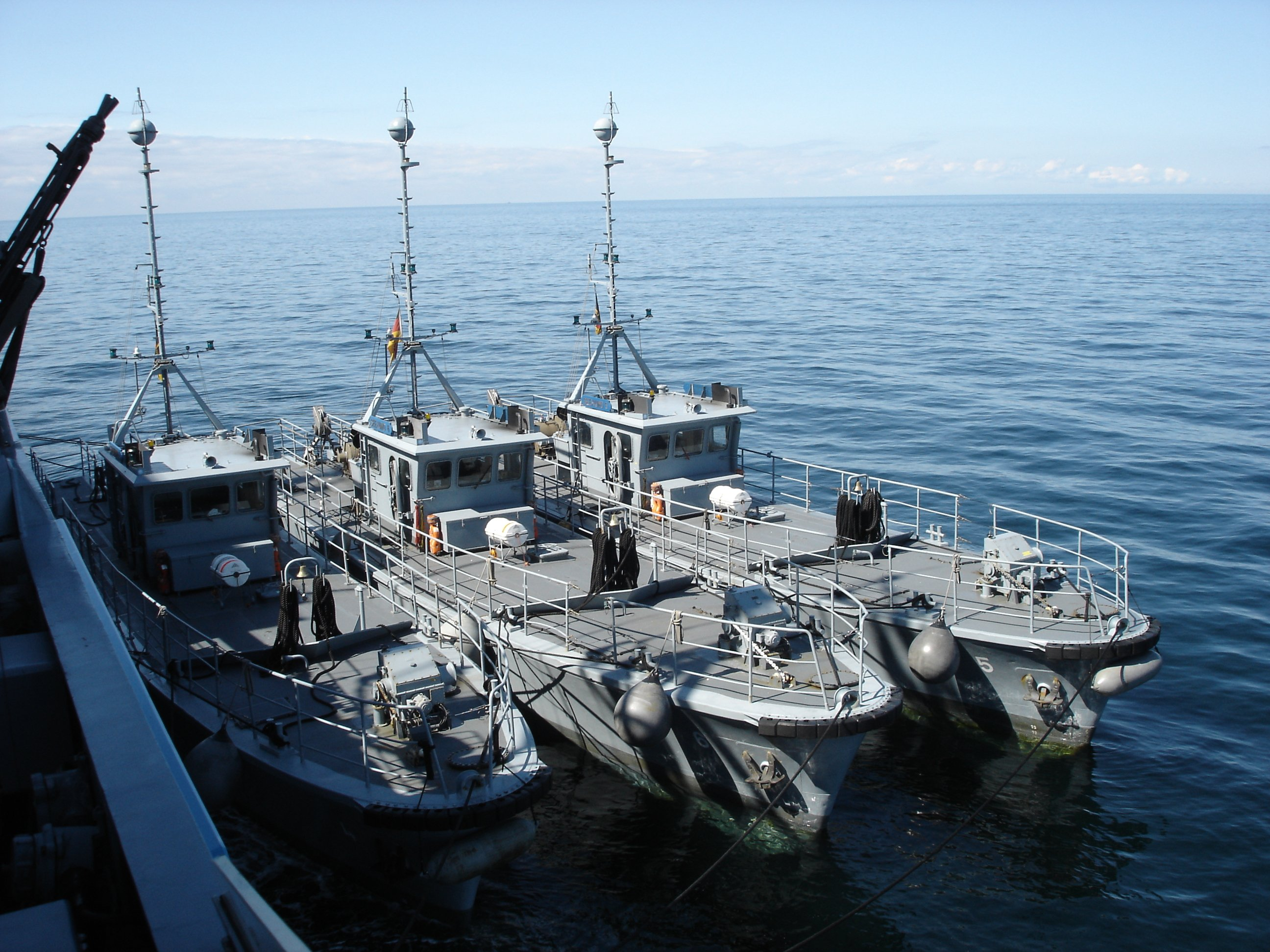
Three Seehund ROVs

- Builders: Germany
- Type: Mine sweeping TROIKA Plus ROV (together with Ensdorf class minesweepers)
- Length: 25m
- Displacement: 99t
- Propulsion: Schottel Z-drive
- Max speed: 9-10 kn
- Ships in class: 18
- Operator: German Navy
- Status: In active service

TROIKA PLUS: This system employs up to four remote controlled Seehund (sea dog or seal) drones which perform the sweep. The drones are small unmanned boats that can simulate the acoustic and magnetic signatures of bigger ships to trigger mines. Their small size and special construction let them survive the effects of exploding mines unharmed. Seehund can be controlled remotely or manually by an onboard crew (usually 3) for maneuvering in harbours or in training (the Seehund is too large to be carried by Ensdorf class vessels). A life raft is carried for this reason.

Sonya-class minesweeper (Project 1265 Yakhont)

- Builder: Soviet Union
- Displacement: 450 tons
- Operators:
  - Bulgarian Navy: 4 delivered from 1981
  - Russian Navy: 19 in service

T-43 patrol minesweeper

- Builder: Soviet Union / China
- Displacement: 569 tons
- Operators:
  - Albanian Naval Force: 1 delivered in 1960
  - People's Liberation Army Navy: 40 in service, including locally built models, plus 3 modified as coastal survey ships
  - Bangladesh Navy: At least 1 in active service

T-301 patrol minesweeper

- Builder: Soviet Union
- Displacement: 164 tons
- Operators:
  - Albanian Naval Force: 1 or 2 remaining

Vanya-class coastal minesweeper

- Builder: Soviet Union
- Displacement: 245 tons
- Operators:
  - Bulgarian Navy: 4 of many delivered from 1970

=== Minelayers ===
Hämeenmaa class minelayer

- Builders: Finland (Aker Finnyards in Rauma)
- Type: Minelayer, escort and logistical support ship
- Displacement: 1,300 tons
- Armament: 8 Umkhonto-IR SAM; 1 57 mm gun; 2 23 mm doublebarrel guns; 2 RBU-1200 ASROC launchers; 2 depth charge rails; 100–150 mines
- Powerplant: 2 diesel engines; 2 shafts; 6,300 hp total power
- Speed: 20 knots
- Ships in class: 2
- Operator: Finnish Navy
- Commissioned: 1992
- Status: In active service

Pansio class minelayer

- Builders: Finland (Olkiluoto Shipyard)
- Type: Minelayer and logistical transport
- Displacement: 620 tons
- Armament: 2 23 mm doublebarrel guns; 2 12.7 mm machineguns; 100 mines
- Powerplant: 2 diesel engines; 2 shafts; 1,500 hp total power
- Speed: 11 knots
- Ships in class: 3
- Operator: Finnish Navy
- Commissioned: 1991
- Status: In active service

Pohjanmaa class minelayer

- Builders: Finland (Wärtsilä in Helsinki)
- Type: Ocean capable minelayer and training ship
- Displacement: 1,450 tons
- Armament: 1 57 mm gun; 1 40 mm gun; 2 23 mm doublebarrel guns; 2 12.7 mm machineguns; 2 depth charge rails; 150 mines
- Cargo: 50 trainees (in place of mines)
- Powerplant: 2 diesel engines; 2 shafts; 6,300 hp total power
- Speed: 18 knots
- Ships in class: 1
- Operator: Finnish Navy
- Commissioned: 8 June 1979
- Status: In active service

== Amphibious warfare vessels ==
=== Amphibious assault ships ===
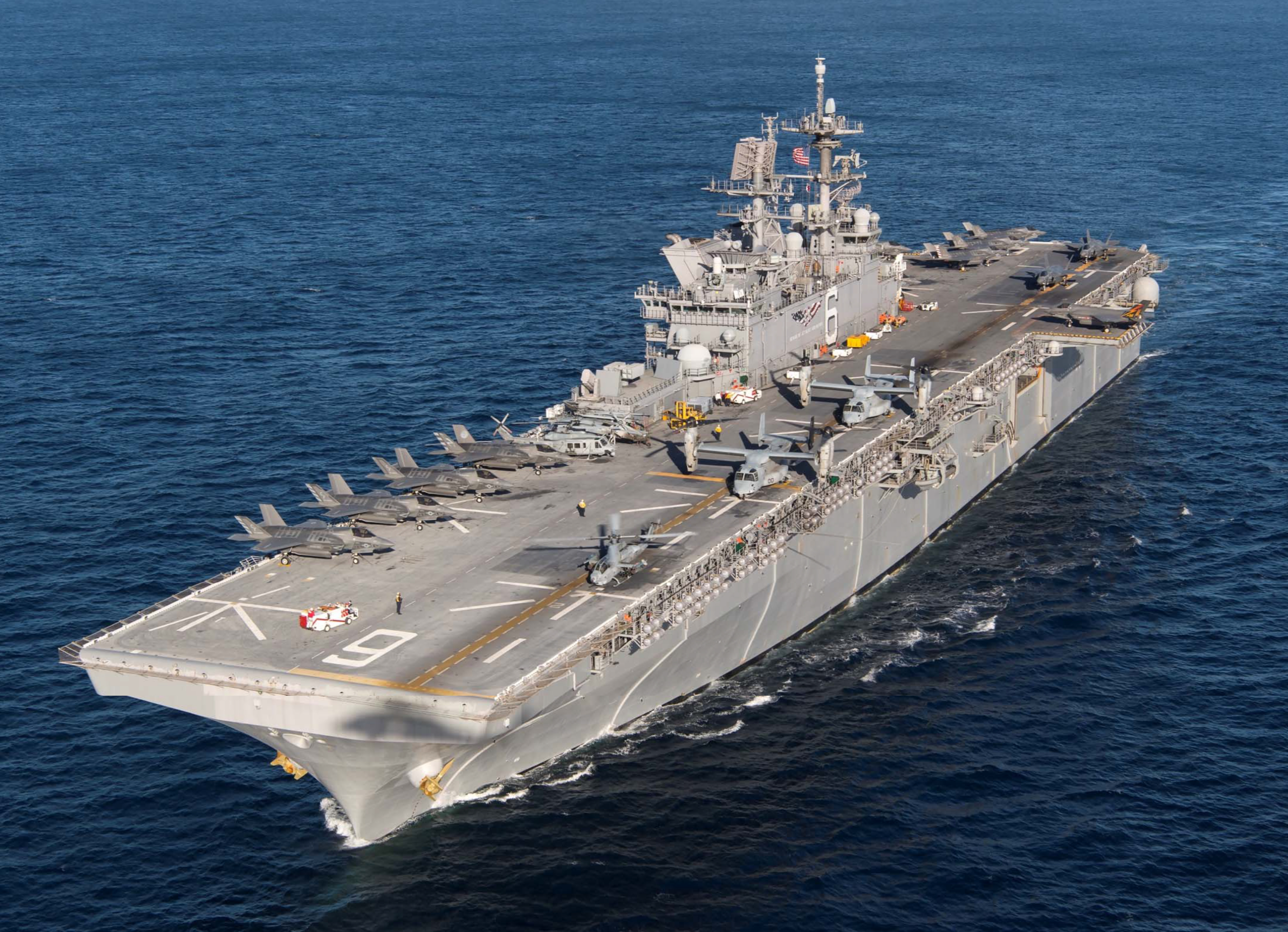
America

America-class amphibious assault ship (LHA-6)

- Builder: United States
- Displacement: 45,000 tons
- Armament:
  - 2 × RIM-116 Rolling Airframe Missile launchers
  - 2 × Phalanx CIWS
  - 7 × dual .50 cal machine guns
- Aircraft carried:
  - AV-8B Harrier II
  - F-35B Lightning II
  - MV-22B Osprey
  - CH-53E Super Stallion
  - UH-1Y Venom
  - AH-1Z Viper
  - MH-60S Seahawk
- Operator: United States Navy: (2 in commission, at least 9 more planned)

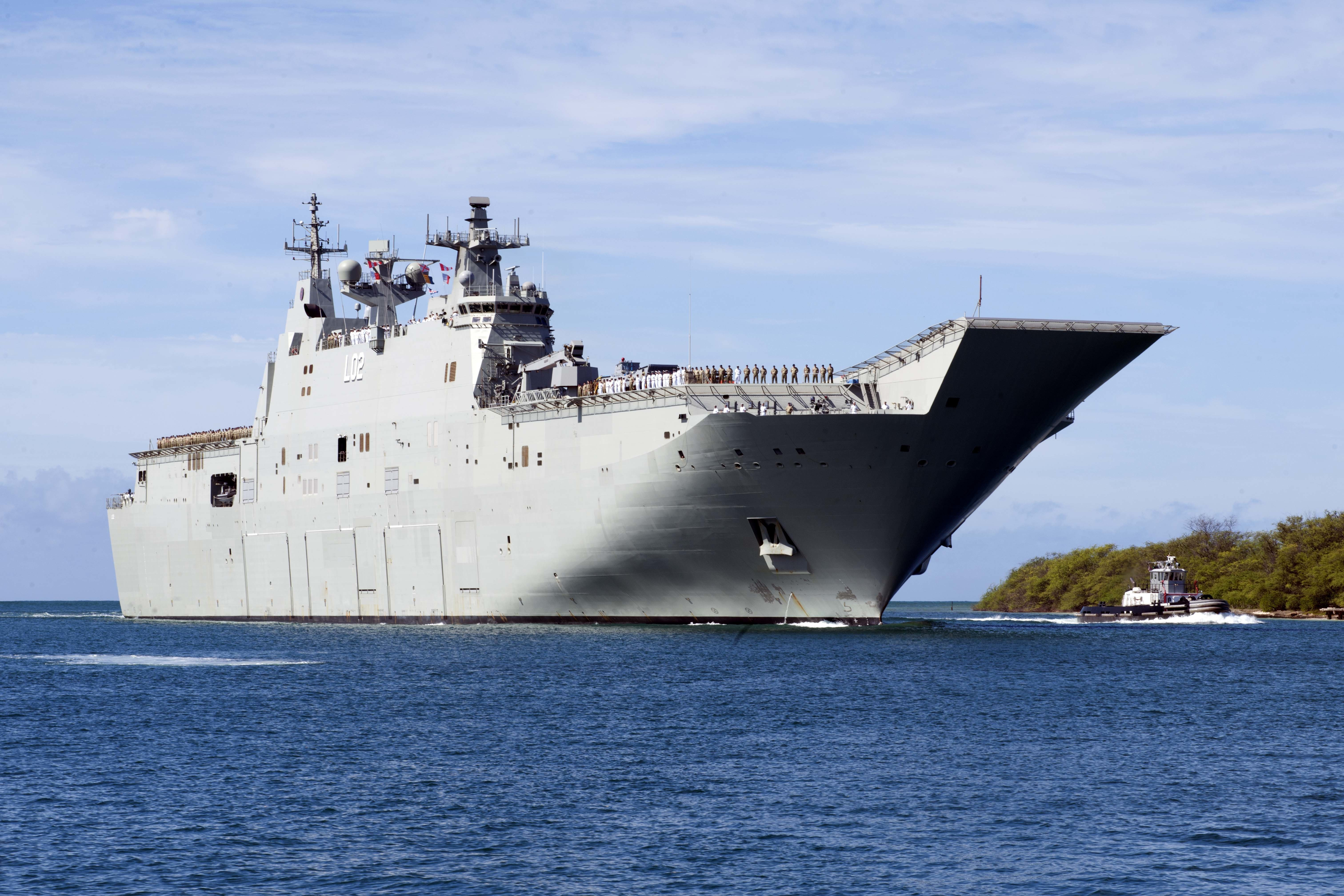
HMAS Canberra participating in RIMPAC exercise 2016

Canberra-class landing helicopter dock (LHD)

- Builder: Spain, Navantia.
- Displacement: 27,500 tons.
- Aircraft carried: standard, 6 helicopters. Maximum in hangar space, 18 helicopters.
- Armament:
  - Radars: Giraffe AMB radar and Saab 9LV combat system.
  - 4 × Rafael Typhoon 25 mm remote weapons systems
  - 6 × 25mm Bushmaster chain gun
  - 1 x coaxially mounted M240 7.62mm machine gun.
  - Nulka decoy system
- Operators: Royal Australian Navy, two in commission.

Dokdo-class amphibious assault ship (LPX)

- Builder: South Korea
- Displacement: 18,800 tons
- Operator: Republic of Korea Navy: 2 in commission

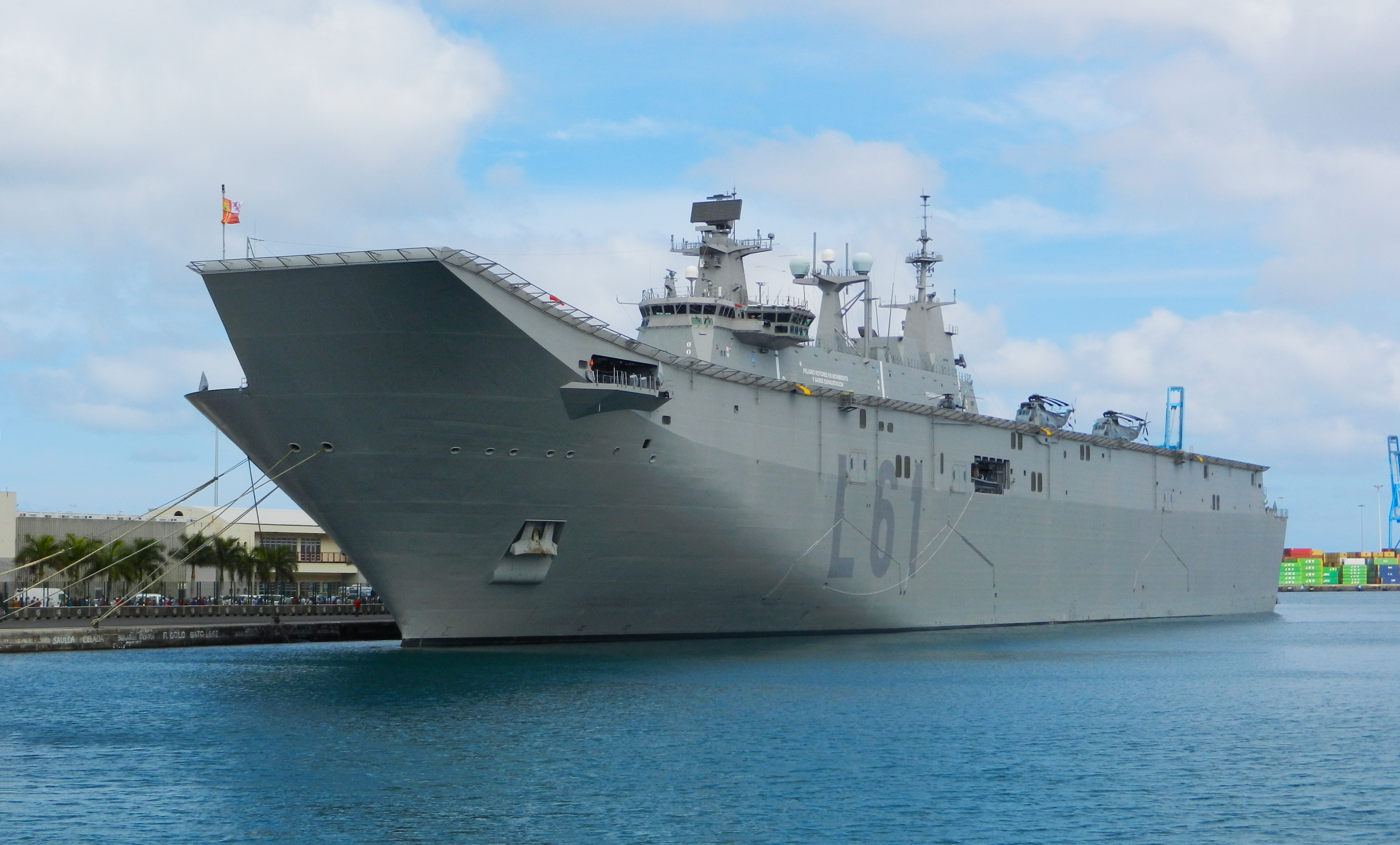
Juan Carlos I (L-61)

Juan Carlos I landing helicopter dock (LHD)

- Builder: Spain
- Displacement: 27,000 tons
- Aircraft carried:
  - AV-8B Harrier II Plus
  - NH-90
  - MH-60
  - Eurocopter Tigre (Spanish Army)
- Operator: Spanish Navy: 1 in commission, Royal Australian Navy, 2 in commission,

Anadolu-class amphibious assault ship-aircraft carrier

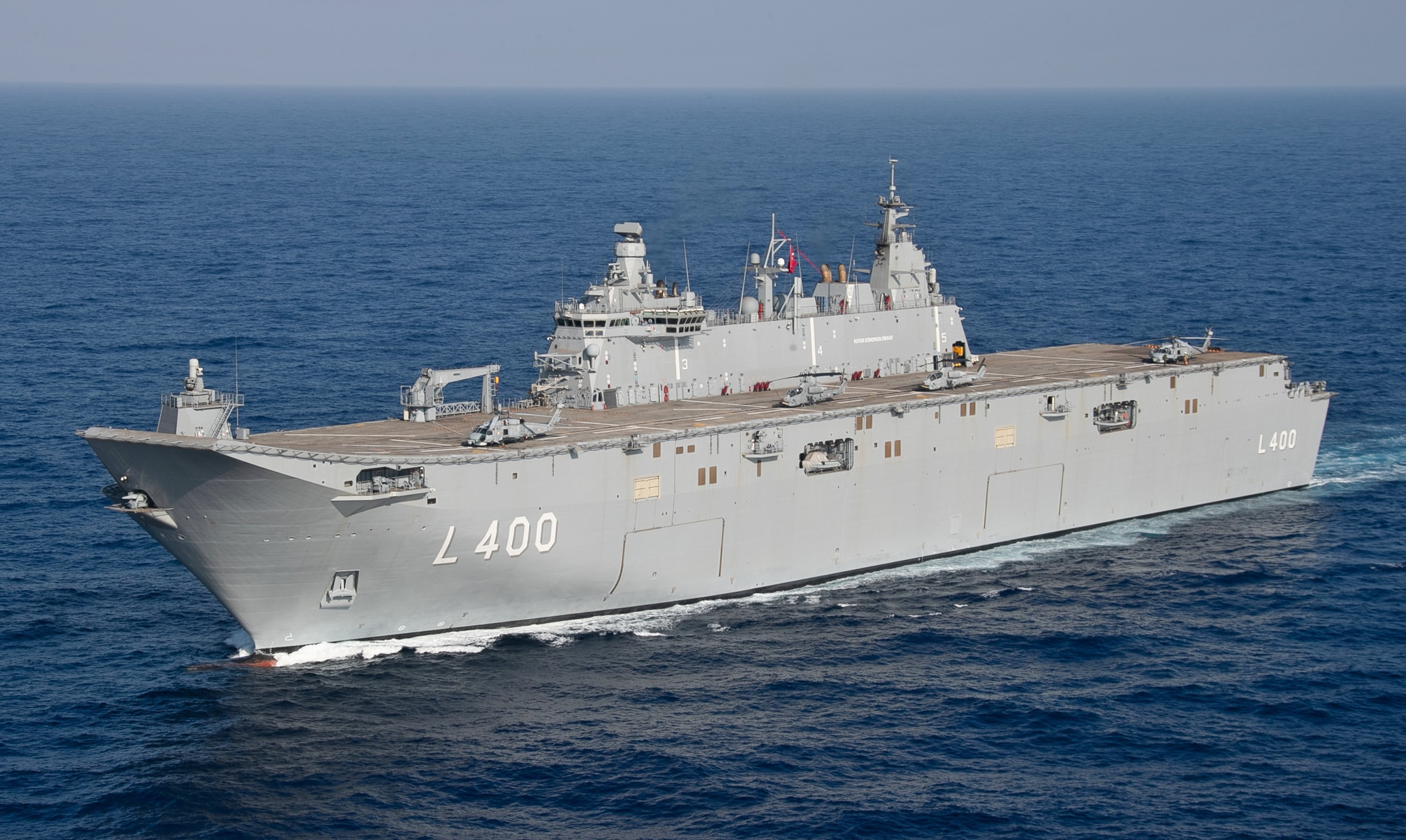
TCG Anadolu

- Builder: Turkey,Spain ,Sedef Shipyard.
- Displacement: 27,436 tonnes
- Aircraft carried:
  - S-70B-28 Seahawk
  - AH-1W Super Cobra (to be replaced with TAI T929 ATAK 2)
  - Bayraktar TB3 (planned)
  - Bayraktar Kızılelma (planned)
- Operator: Turkish Navy (1 in commission, 1 is being planned)

Mistral-class projection and command ship

- Builder: France
- Displacement: 21,300 tons
- Operator: French Navy: 3 in commission, Russian Navy (2 Launched, Russian sale cancelled, sold to Egypt), Egyptian Navy 2 in commission

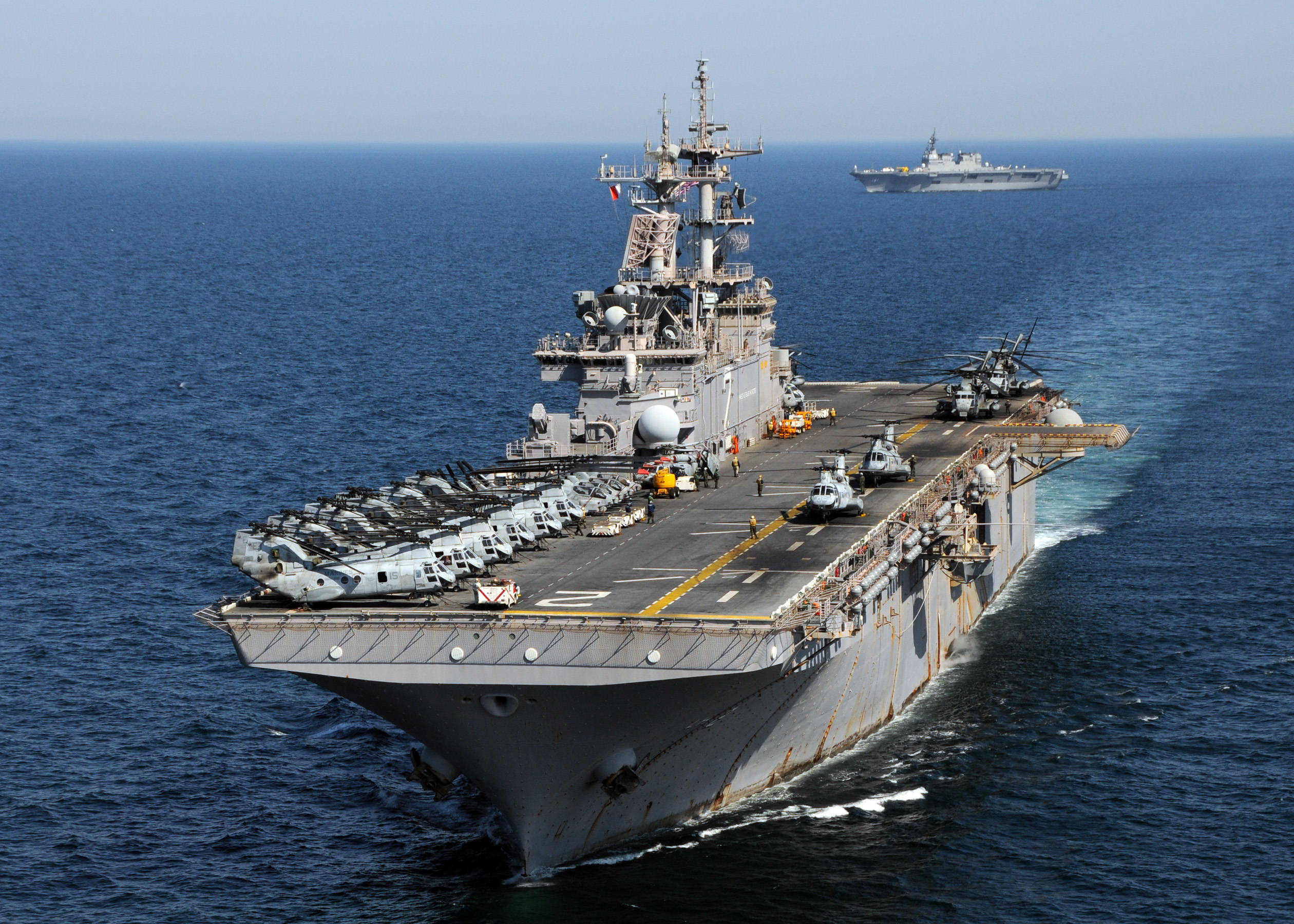
Essex

Wasp-class amphibious assault ship (LHD 1)

- Builder: United States
- Displacement: 40,500 tons
- Armament:
  - 2 × RIM-116 Rolling Airframe Missile launchers
  - 2 × RIM-7 Sea Sparrow launchers
  - 3 × Phalanx CIWS
  - 4 × Mk 38 25 mm Machine Gun Systems
  - 4 × .50 cal machine guns
- Aircraft:
  - AV-8B Harrier II
  - F-35B Lightning II
  - MV-22B Osprey
  - CH-53E Super Stallion
  - UH-1Y Venom
  - AH-1Z Viper
  - MH-60S Seahawk
- Operator: United States Navy: 7 in commission

=== Dock landing ships ===
Albion-class landing platform dock

- Builder: United Kingdom
- Displacement: 21,500 tons
- Operator: Royal Navy 2 in commission

Bay-class landing ship dock

- Builder: United Kingdom
- Displacement: 16,160 tons
- Operator: Royal Navy, ( Royal Fleet Auxiliary), 3 in commission, Royal Australian Navy, (1 commission in 2012)

Endurance-class landing platform dock

- Builder: Singapore
- Displacement: 8,500 tons
- Operator: Republic of Singapore Navy: 4 in commission (1 building)

Foudre-class dock landing ship

- Builder: France
- Displacement: 12,000 tons
- Operator: French Navy: 2 in service

Galicia-class landing platform dock

- Builder: Spain
- Displacement: 13,815 tons
- Operator: Spanish Navy: 2 in commission

Harpers Ferry-class amphibious transport dock (LSD 49)

- Builder: United States
- Displacement: 16,500 tons
- Armament:
  - 2 × 25 mm Mk 38 cannons
  - 2 × Phalanx CIWS
  - 2 × RIM-116 Rolling Airframe Missile launchers
  - 6 × .50 cal M2HB machine guns
- Operator: United States Navy: 4 in commission

Hsu Hai-class dock landing ship

- Builder: United States
- Displacement: 14,225 tons
- Operator: Republic of China Navy 1 in commission (5 built)

Johan de Witt-class amphibious transport dock

- Builder: Netherlands
- Displacement: 17,550 tons
- Operator: Royal Netherlands Navy: 1 in commission

Makassar-class landing platform dock

- Builder: Indonesia
- Displacement: 11,394 tons
- Operator: Indonesian Navy: 5 in commission

Mk IV LCU landing craft utility

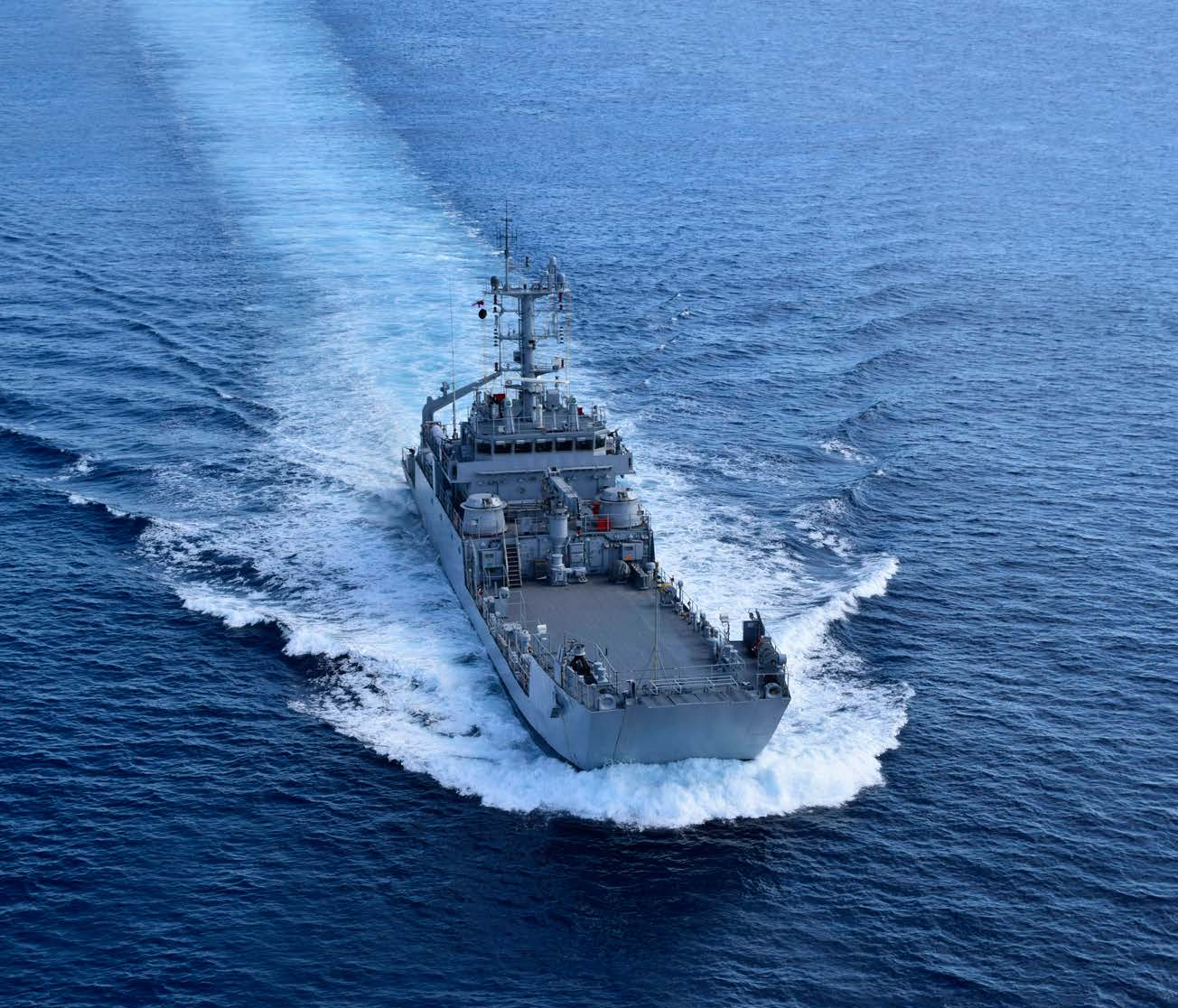
Mk IV LCU during sea trials

- Builder: India
- Displacement: 1,001 tons
- Operator: Indian Navy: 8 in commission

Ouragan-class amphibious transport dock

- Builder: France
- Displacement: 8,500 tons
- Operator: French Navy: 2 (Retired in 2007)

Ōsumi-class LST amphibious transport dock

- Builder: Japan
- Displacement: 14,000 tons
- Operator: Japan Maritime Self-Defense Force: 3 in commission

Rotterdam-class amphibious transport dock (L 800)

- Builder: Netherlands
- Displacement: 12,750 tons
- Operator: Royal Netherlands Navy: 1 in commission

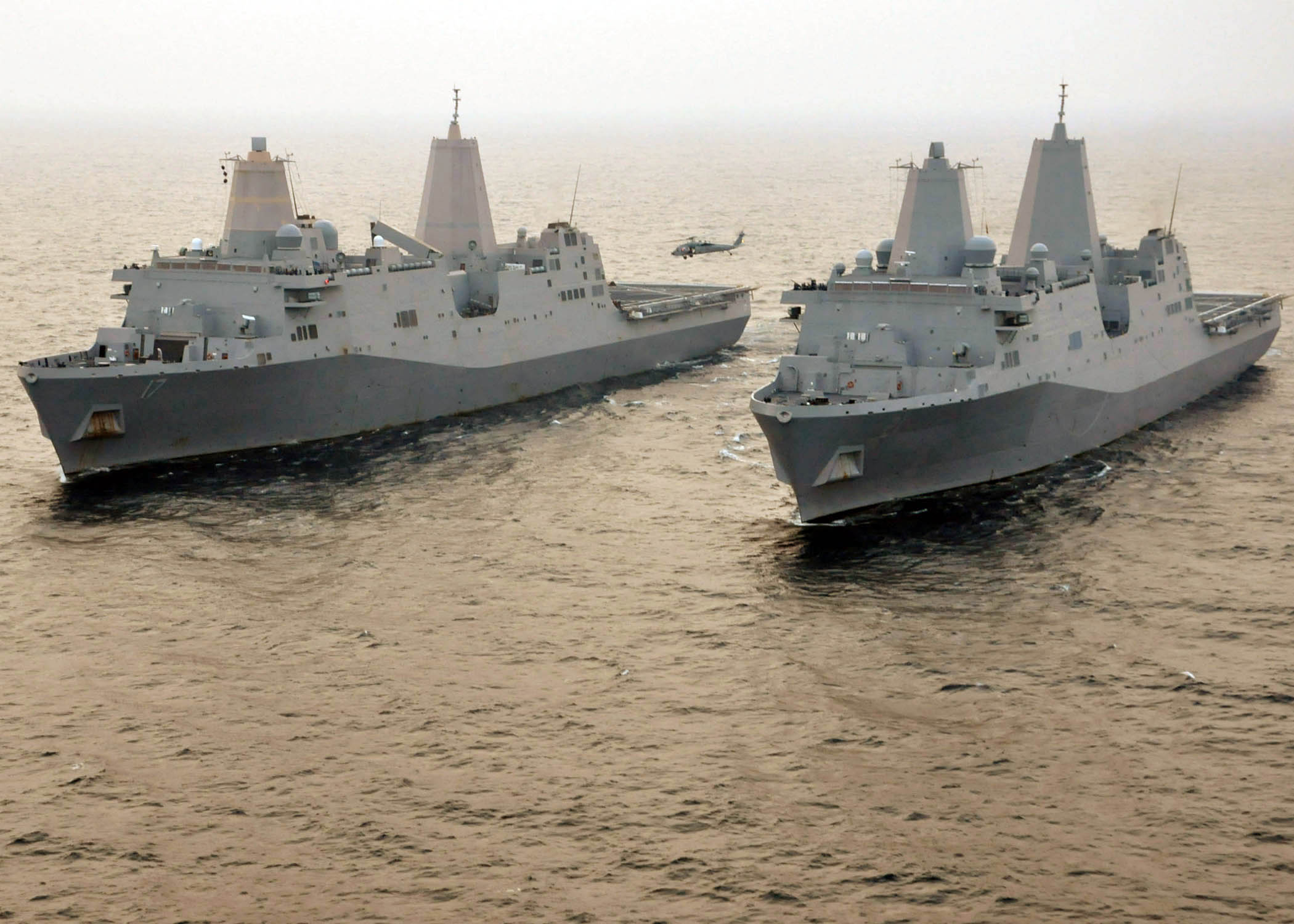
San Antonio and New York

San Antonio-class amphibious transport dock (LPD 17)

- Builder: United States
- Displacement: 25,000 tons
- Armament:
  - 2 × Bushmaster II 30 mm guns
  - 2 × RIM-116 Rolling Airframe Missile launchers
  - 2 × Mk 41 eight cell VLS for quad packed RIM-162 ESSMs
- Operator: United States Navy: (11 in commission, 2 under construction, 1 Flight II ordered)

San Giorgio-class amphibious transport dock

- Builder: Italy
- Displacement: 7,650 tons
- Operator Marina Militare: 3 in service

Tarlac-class landing platform dock

- Builder: Indonesia
- Displacement: 11,583 tons
- Operator: Philippine Navy: 2 in commission

Thomaston-class dock landing ship

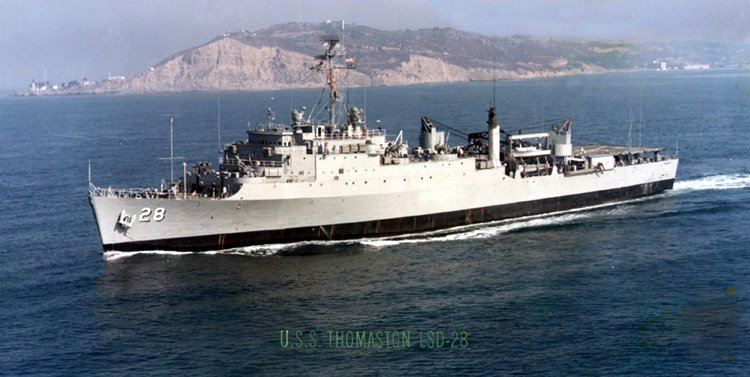
Thomaston-class dock landing ship

- Builder:
  - United States
- Displacement:
  - 11,989 tons (full load)
- Operator:
  - Brazilian Navy: 1 in service

Whidbey Island-class dock landing ship (LSD 41)

- Builder: United States
- Displacement: 16,300 tons
- Armament:
  - 2 × 25 mm Mk 38 cannons
  - 2 × Phalanx CIWS
  - 2 × RIM-116 Rolling Airframe Missile launchers
  - 6 × .50 cal M2HB machine guns
- Operator: United States Navy: 8 in commission

Yuzhao-class (Type 071) amphibious warfare ship

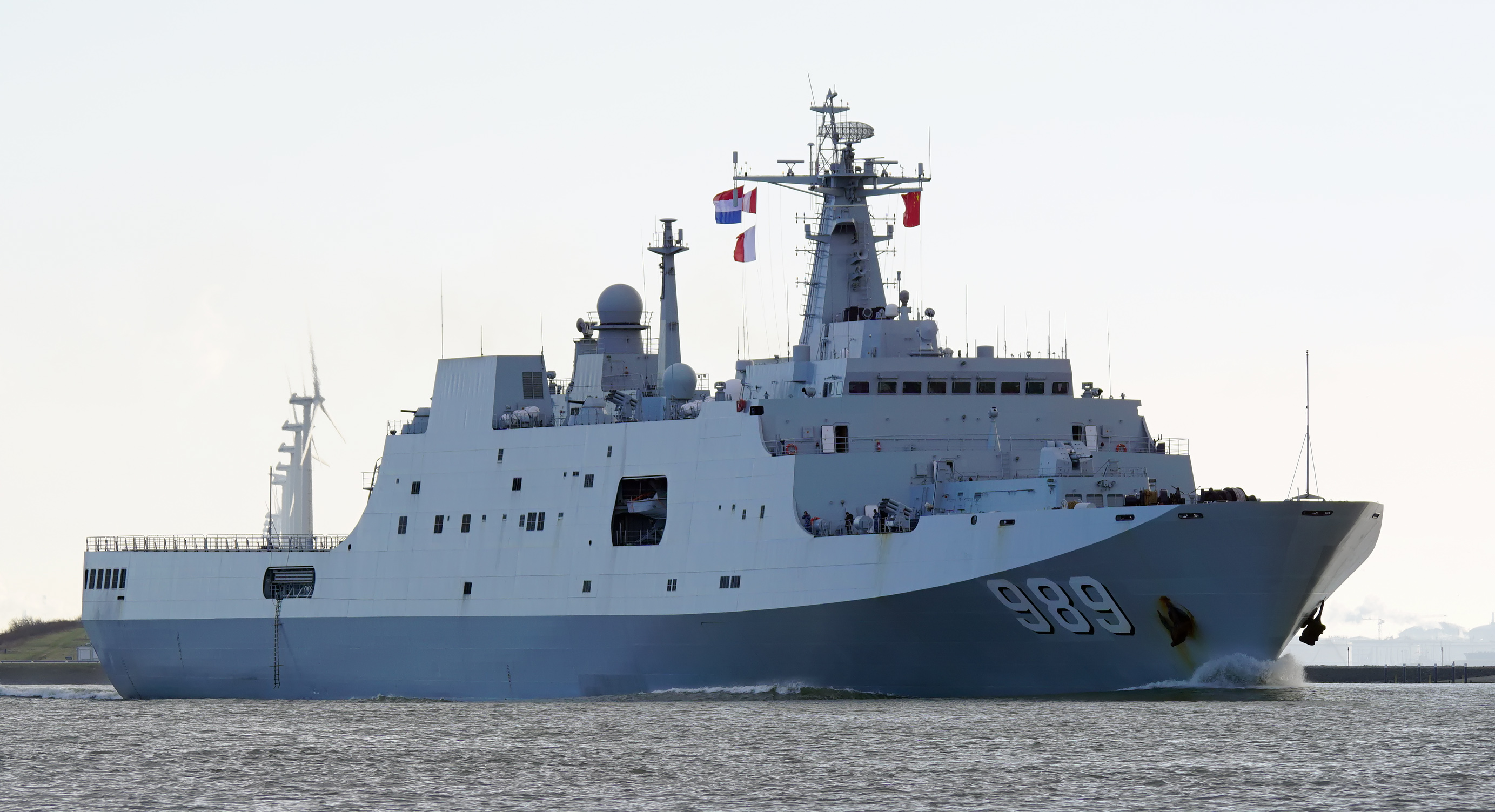
Yuzhao-class amphibious warfare ship

- Builder:
  - China
- Displacement:
  - 25,000 tons (full load)
- Operator:
  - People's Liberation Army Navy: 6 in service, 1 fitting out

=== Landing craft and landing ships ===
Balikpapan-class (LHC) Heavy Landing Craft

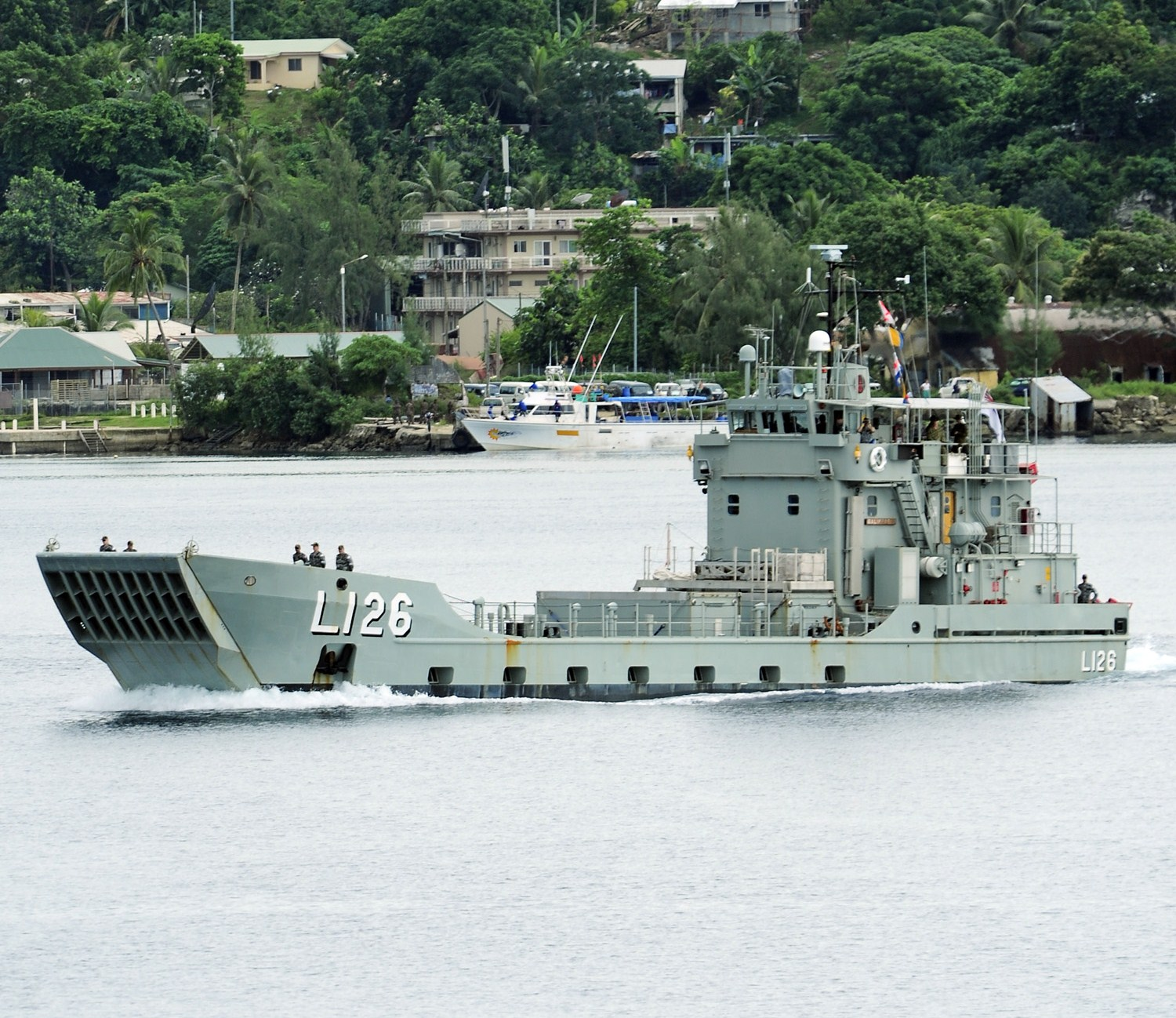
Balikpapan-class Landing Heavy Craft

- Builder:
  - Australia
- Displacement:
  - 364 tons (standard), 503 tons (full load)
- Operator:
  - Papua New Guinea Maritime Element: 3 in service
  - Philippine Navy: 5 in service

Barbe-class (Type 520) Landing Craft Utility

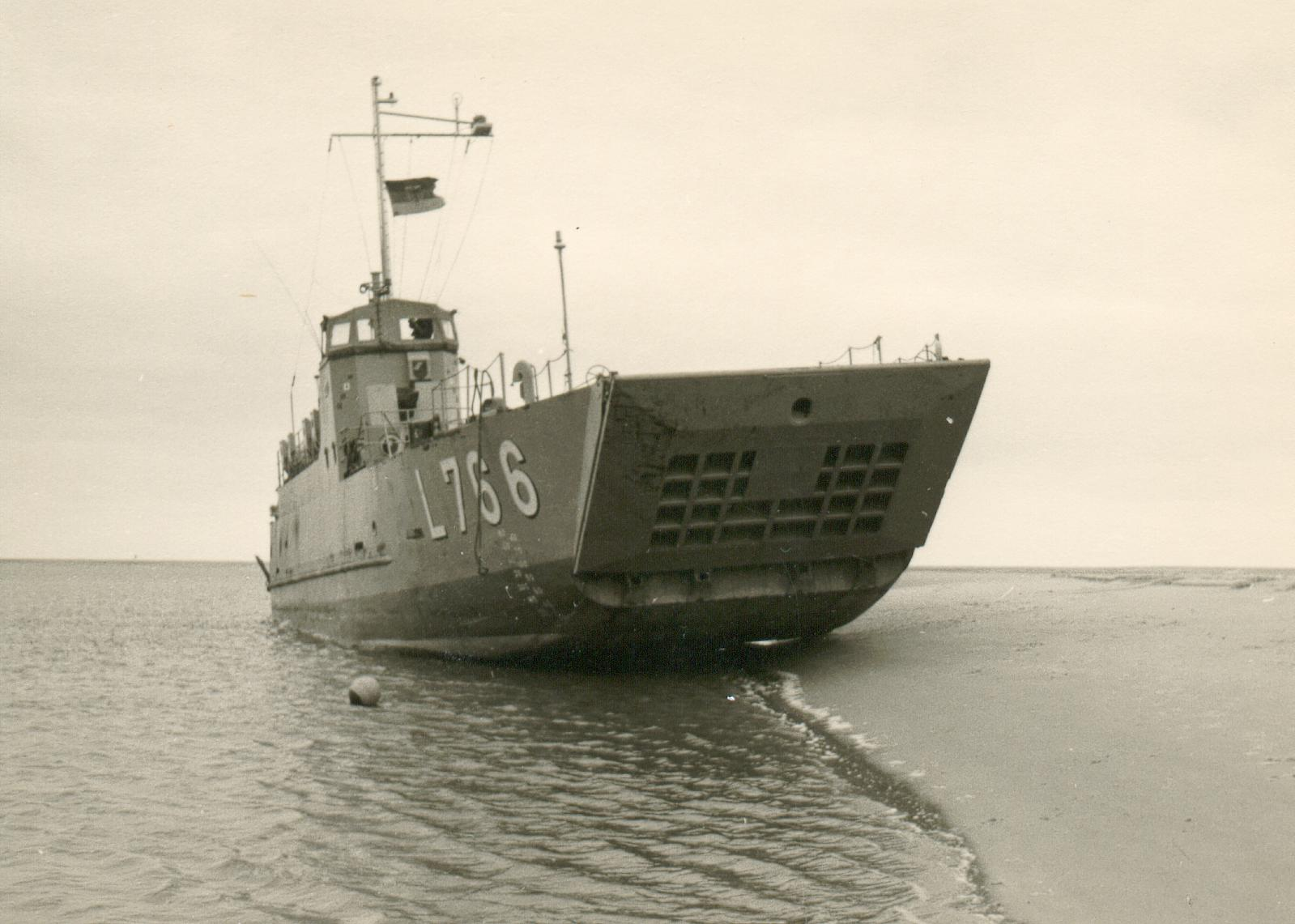
Barbe-class (Type 520) Landing Craft Utility

- Builder:
  - Germany
- Displacement:
  - 430 tons (full load)
- Operator:
  - German Navy: 2 in service
  - Hellenic Navy: 11 in service

BATRAL (Champlain-class) Medium Landing Ship

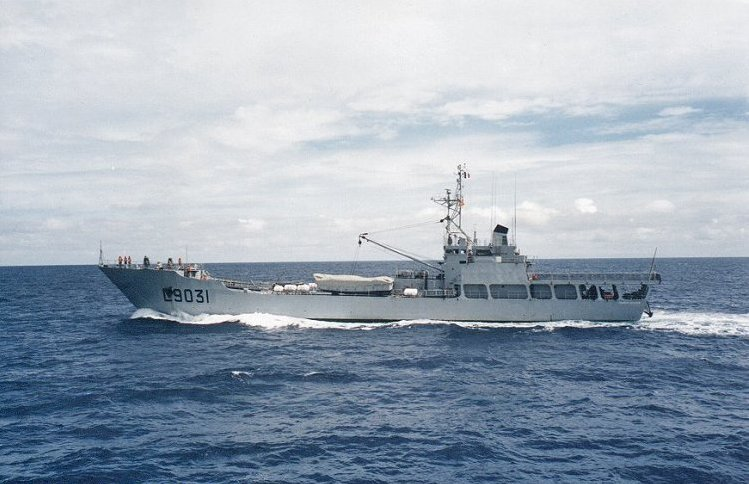
BATRAL (Champlain-class) Medium Landing Ship

- Builder:
  - France
- Displacement:
  - 770 tons (standard), 1,300 tons (full load)
- Operator:
  - French Navy: 5 in service

Bayraktar-class - (LST) Landing ship tank

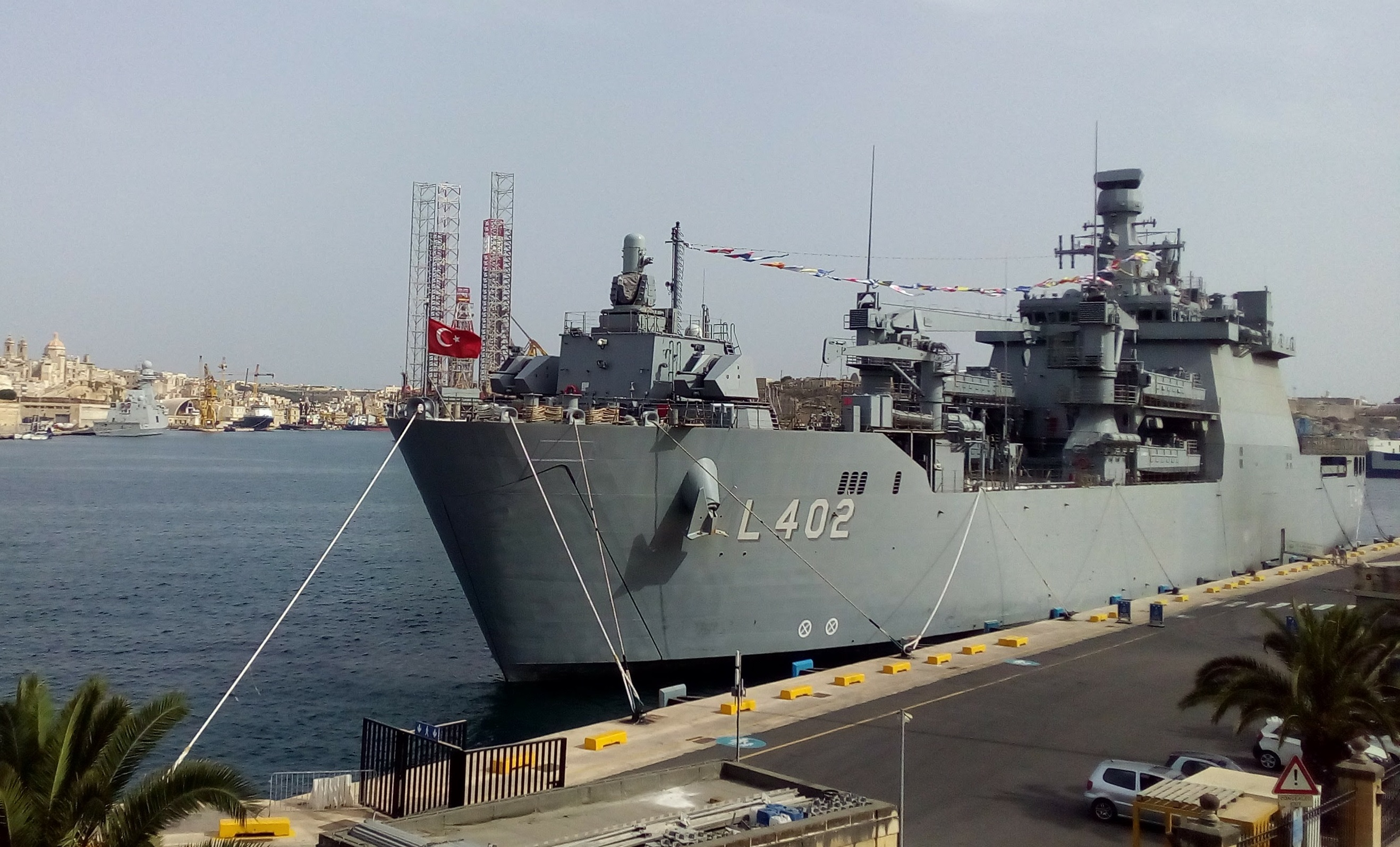
TCG Bayraktar

- Builder:
  - Turkey
- Displacement:
  - 7,245 tons (standard), 7,370 tons (full load)
- Operator:
  - Turkish Navy: 2 in service (2 planned)

Dyugon-class (Project 21820) Small Landing Ship

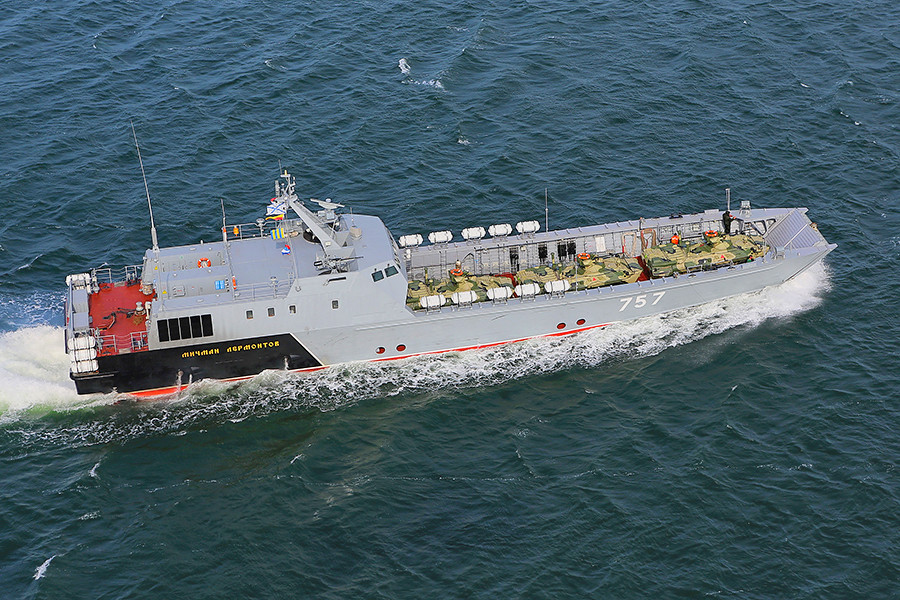
Dyugon-class (Project 21820) Small Landing Ship

- Builder:
  - Russia
- Displacement:
  - 280 tons (full load)
- Operator:
  - Russian Navy: 5 in service

Hoyerswerda-class (Project 109, NATO reporting name Frosch) Medium Landing Ship

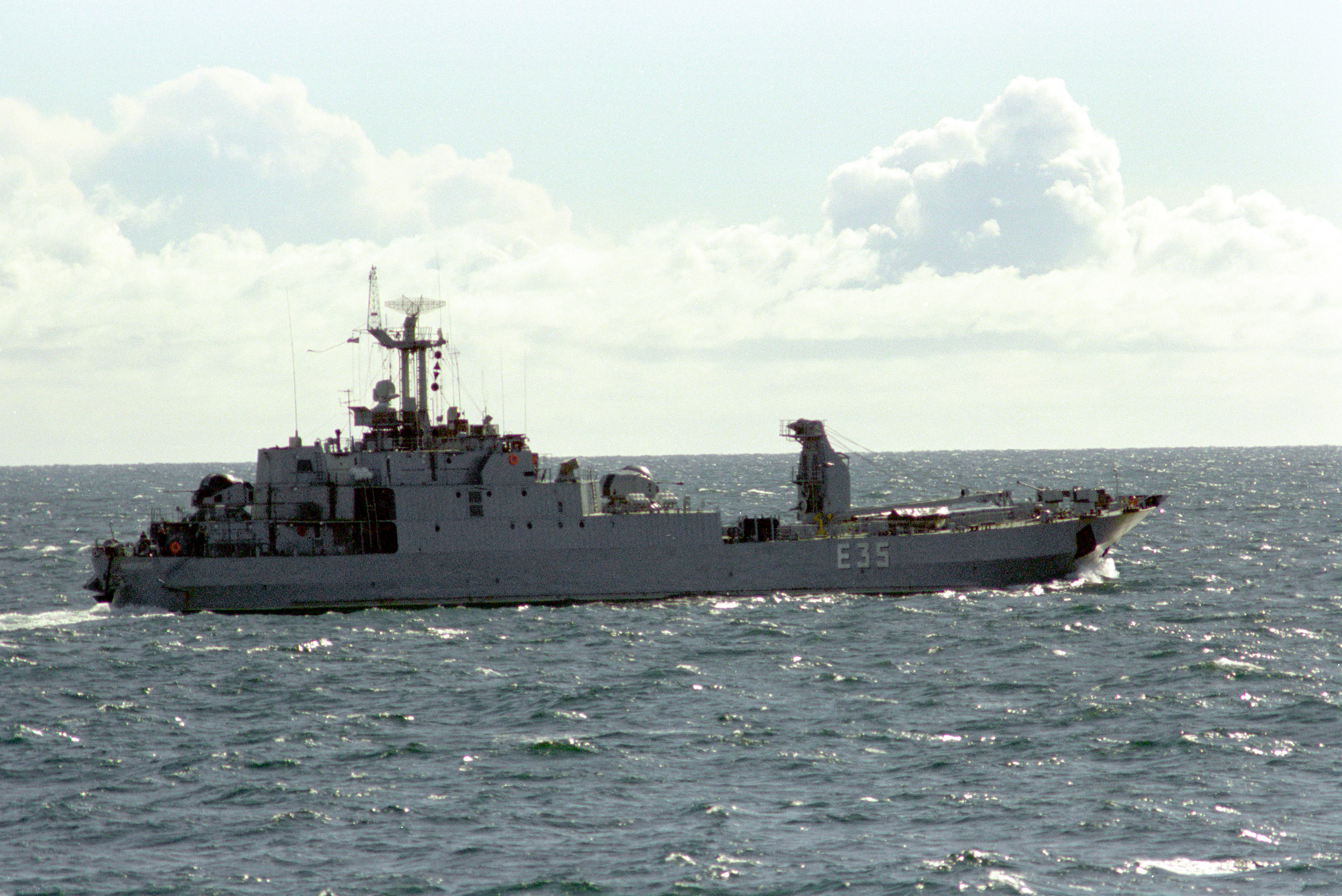
Hoyerswerda-class (Project 109, NATO codename Frosch) Medium Landing Ship

- Builder:
  - East Germany
- Displacement:
  - 1,744 tons
- Operator:
  - Indonesian Navy: 12 in service

Ivan Gren-class (Project 11711) Large Landing Ship

- Builder:
  - Russia
- Displacement:
  - 5,080 tons (standard), 6,000 tons (full load)
- Operator:
  - Russian Navy: 2 in service

Jason-class (LST) Tank Landing Ship

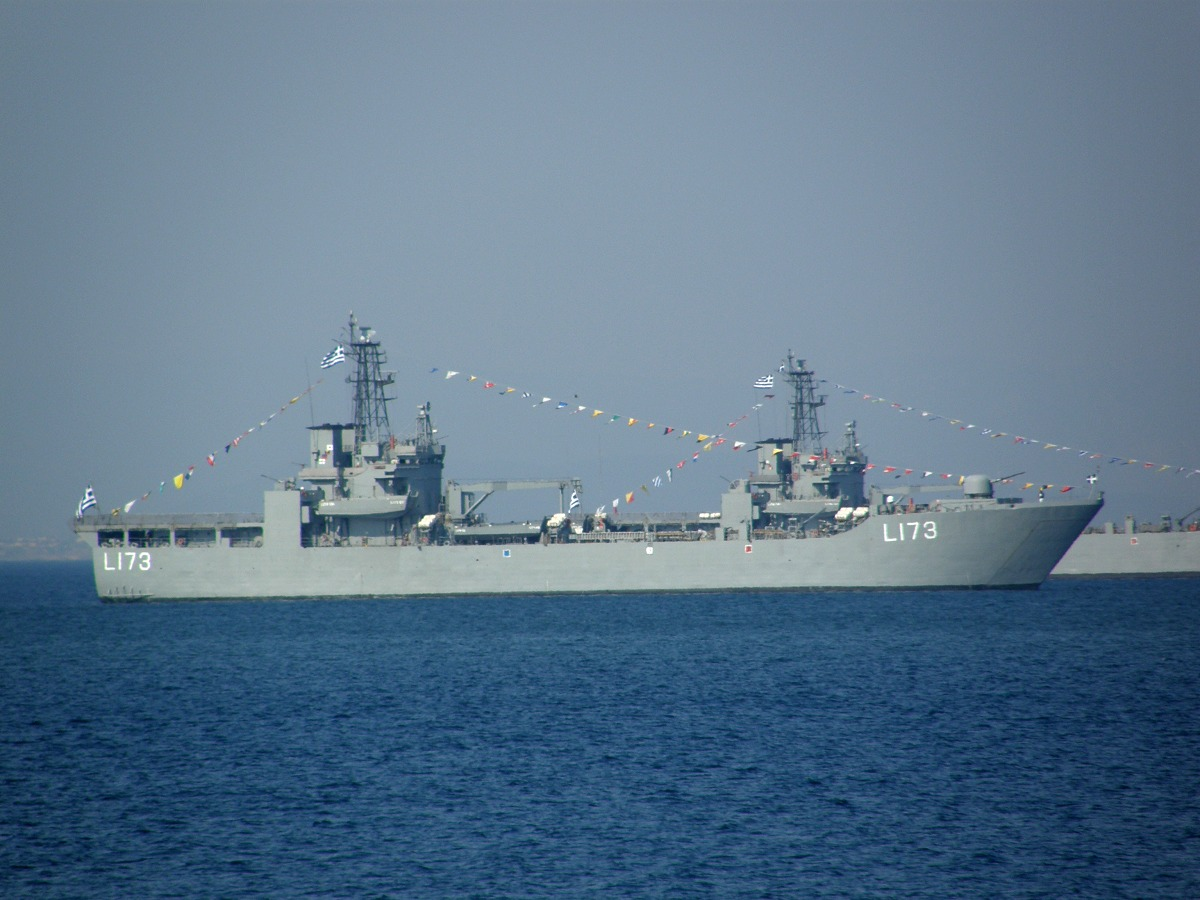
Jason-class (LST) Tank Landing Ship

- Builder:
  - Greece
- Displacement:
  - 4,470 tons (full load)
- Operator:
  - Hellenic Navy: 5 in service

Kumbhir class (LST) Tank Landing Ship

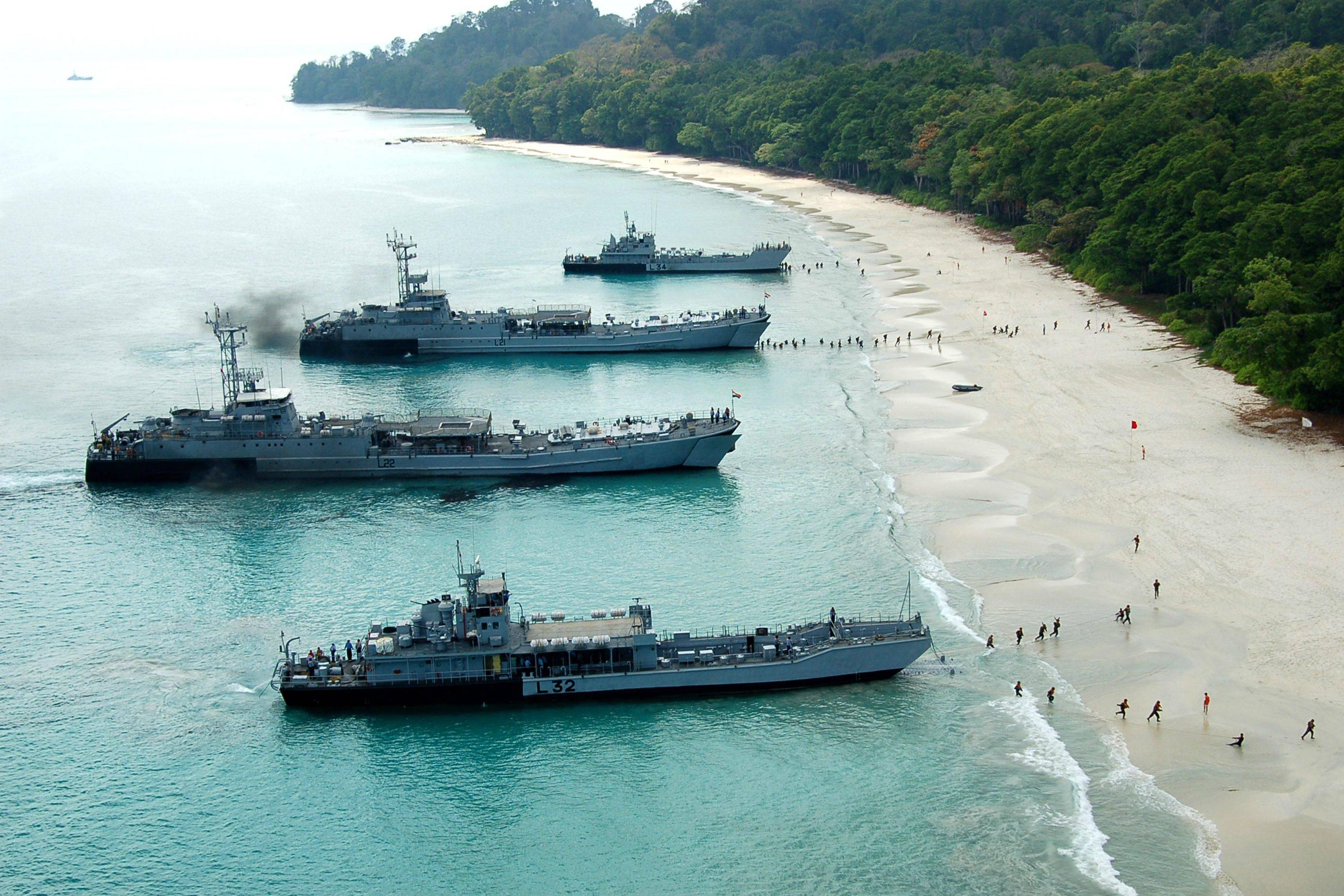
Kumbhir-class (LST) Tank Landing Ship

- Builder:
  - India
- Displacement:
  - 1,120 tons (standard)
- Operator:
  - Indian Navy: 4 in service

LST-117-class (LST) Tank Landing Ship

- Builder:
  - United States
- Displacement:
  - 2,366 tons
- Operator:
  - Indonesian Navy: 3 in service

LST Mk 2-class (LST) Tank Landing Ship

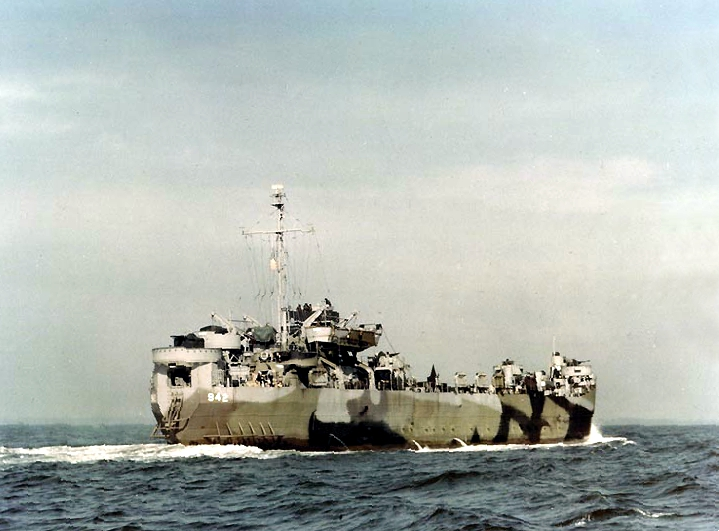
LST Mk 2-class (LST) Tank Landing Ship

- Builder:
  - United States
- Displacement:
  - 1,809 tons (light), 3,942 tons (full load)
- Operator:
  - Argentine Navy: 12 in service
  - Chilean Navy: 2 in service
  - Ecuadorian Navy: 3 in service
  - Indonesian Navy: 4 in service
  - Korean People's Navy: 4 in service
  - Philippine Navy: 2 in service 1 serve as an outpost
  - Republic of Singapore Navy: 4 in service
  - Vietnam People's Navy: 1 in service

Magar-class (LST) Tank Landing Ship

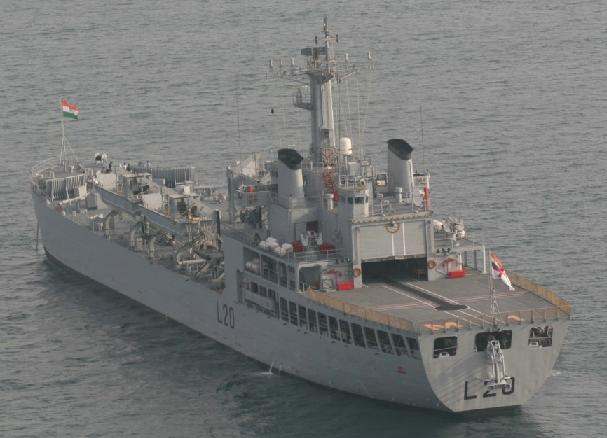
Magar-class Tank Landing Ship

- Builder:
  - India
- Displacement:
  - 5,665 tons (full load)
- Operator:
  - Indian Navy: 2 in service

Newport-class (LST) Tank Landing Ship

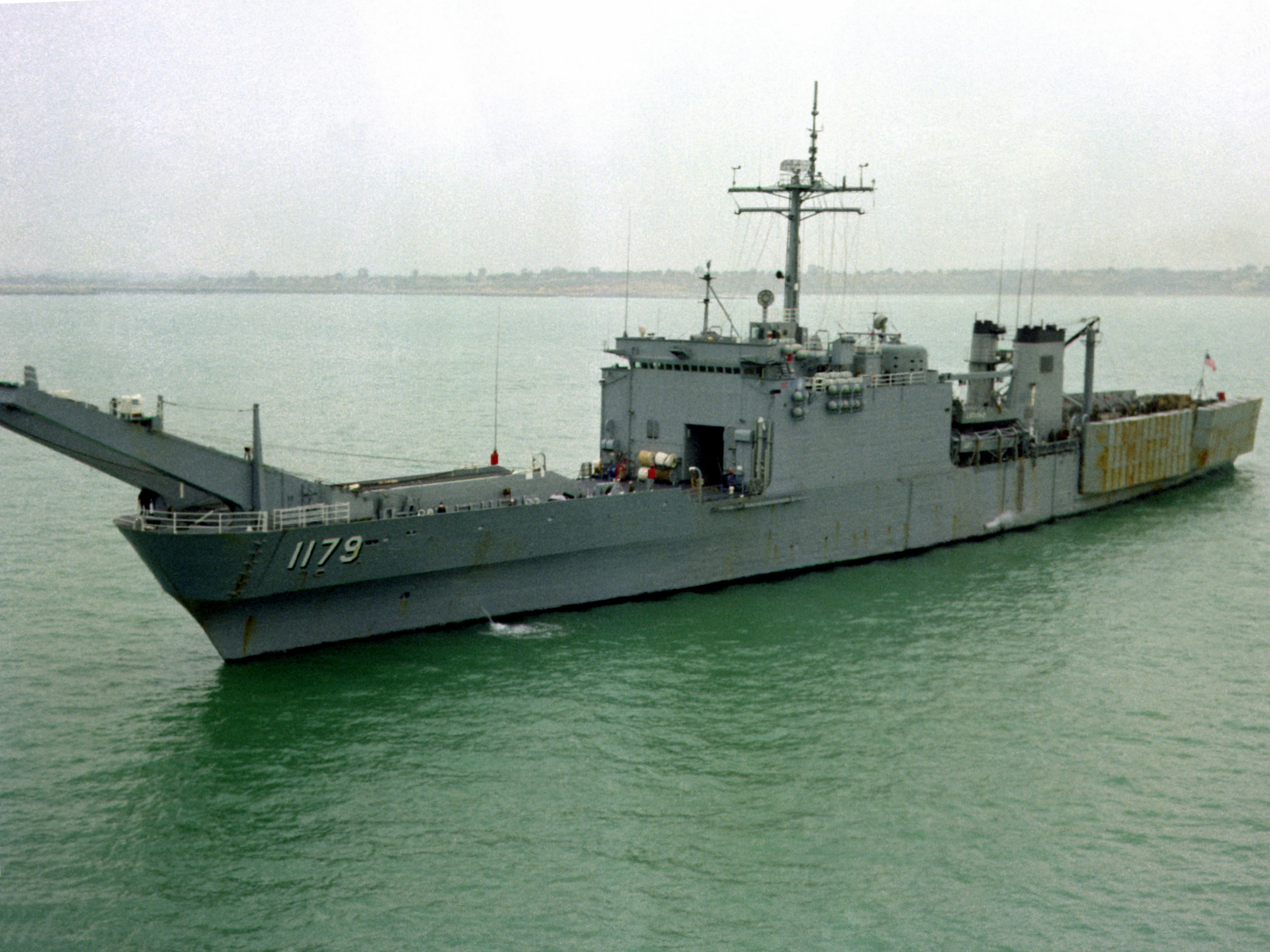
Newport-class Tank Landing Ship

- Builder:
  - United States
- Displacement:
  - 4,793 tons (light), 8,500 tons (full load)
- Operator:
  - Royal Australian Navy: 2 in service
  - Brazilian Navy: 1 in service
  - Royal Moroccan Navy: 1 in service
  - Mexican Navy: 2 in service
  - Republic of China Navy: 2 in service

Ondatra-class (Project 1176, NATO reporting name Akula) Small Landing Ship

- Builder:
  - Soviet Union
- Displacement:
  - 107.3 tons (full loaded)
- Operator:
  - Border Police of Georgia: 2 in service
  - Russian Navy: 4 in service
  - Ukrainian Navy: 1 in service

Polnocny-class (NS-722) Medium Landing Ship

- Builder:
  - Poland
- Displacement:
  - 1,410 tons (full load)
- Operator:
  - Yemeni Navy: 1 in service

Polnocny A-class (Project 770) Medium Landing Ship

- Builder:
  - Poland
- Displacement:
  - 800 tons (full load)
- Operator:
  - Azerbaijani Navy: 2 in service
  - Bulgarian Navy: 1 in service
  - Egyptian Navy: 3 in service

Polnocny B-class (Project 771) Medium Landing Ship

- Builder:
  - Poland
- Displacement:
  - 834 tons (full load)
- Operator:
  - Algerian National Navy: 1 in service
  - Azerbaijani Navy: 2 in service
  - Russian Navy: 6 in service
  - Syrian Navy: 3 in service
  - Vietnam People's Navy: 3 in service

Polnocny C-class (Project 773) Medium Landing Ship

- Builder:
  - Poland
- Displacement:
  - 1,150 tons (full load)
- Operator:
  - Libyan Navy: 2 in service
  - Ukrainian Navy: 1 in service

Polnocny D-class (Project 773U) Medium Landing Ship

- Builder:
  - Poland
- Displacement:
  - 1,233 tons (full load)
- Operator:
  - Algeria − 1 in service
  - Azerbaijan − 1 in service
  - Syria − 3 in service
  - Vietnam − 1 in service

Ropucha I-class (Project 775) Large Landing Ship

- Builder:
  - Poland
- Displacement:
  - 2,200 tons (standard), 4,080 tons (full loaded)
- Operator:
  - Russian Navy: 12 in service

Ropucha II-class (Project 775M) Large Landing Ship

- Builder:
- Poland
- Displacement:
  - 2,200 tons (standard), 4,080 tons (full loaded)
- Operator:
  - Russian Navy: 4 in service

Runnymede-class (LCU 2000) Large Landing Craft

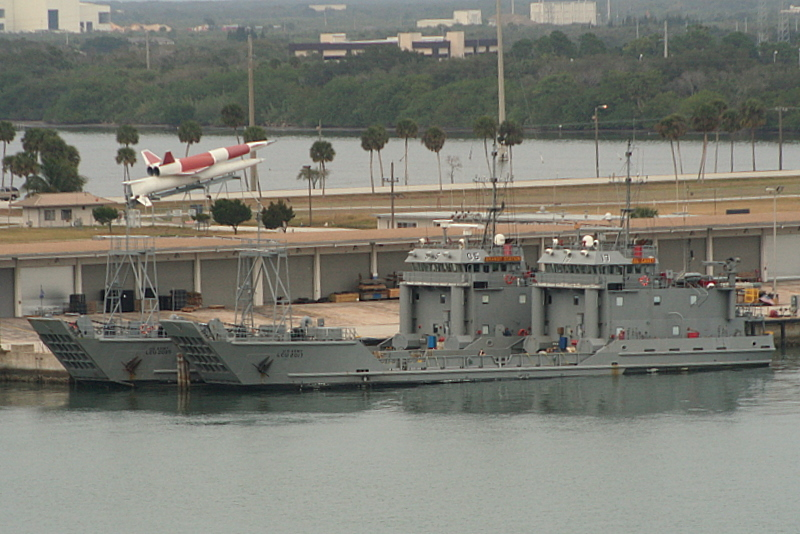
Runnymede-class (LCU 2000) Large Landing Craft

- Builder:
  - United States
- Displacement:
  - 584 tons (standard), 1,104 tons (full load)
- Operator:
  - United States Army: 35 in service

Serna-class (Project 11771) Landing Craft Utility

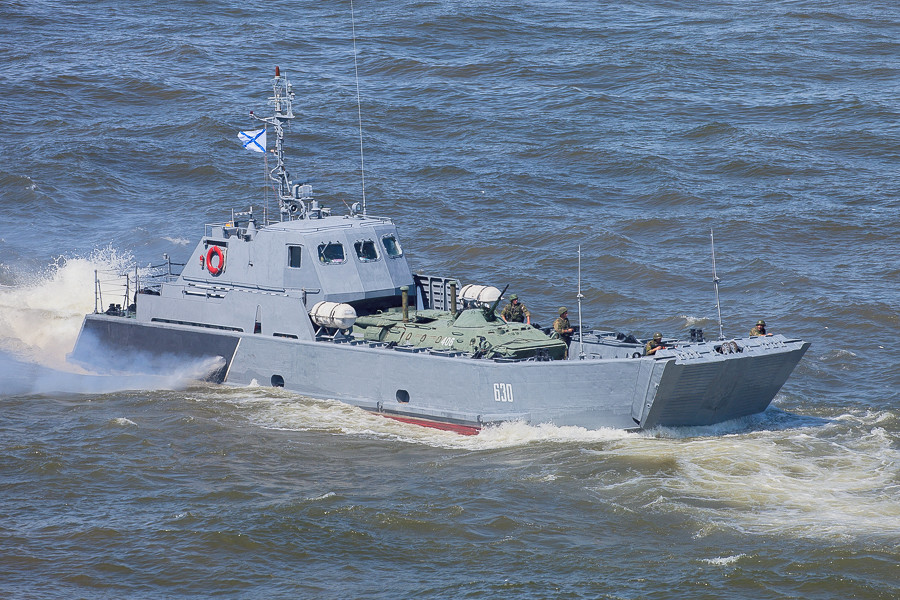
Serna-class (Project 11771) Landing Craft Utility

- Builder:
  - Russia
- Displacement:
  - 61 tons (standard), 99.7 tons (full load)
- Operator:
  - Estonian Navy: 1 in service
  - Russian Navy: 12 in service
  - United Arab Emirates Navy: 3 in service

Shardul-class (LST) Tank Landing Ship

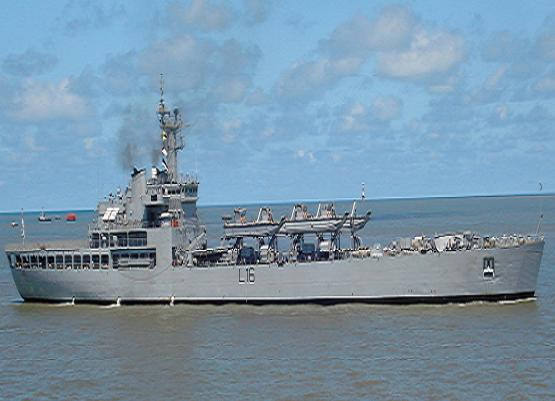
Shardul-class (LST) Tank Landing Ship

- Builder:
  - India
- Displacement:
  - 5,650 tons (full load)
- Operator:
  - Indian Navy: 3 in service

Tagbanua-class (AT-296) Landing Craft Utility

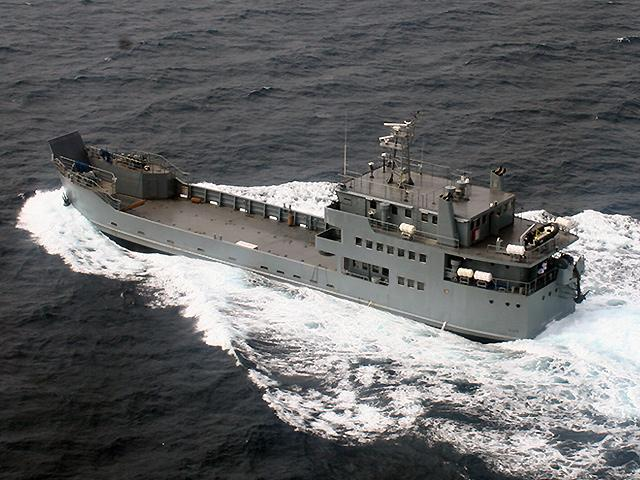
Tagbanua-class (AT-296) Landing Craft Utility

- Builder:
  - Philippines
- Displacement:
  - 579 tons
- Operator:
  - Philippine Navy: 1 in service

Tapir-class (Project 1171, NATO reporting name "Alligator") Large Landing Ship

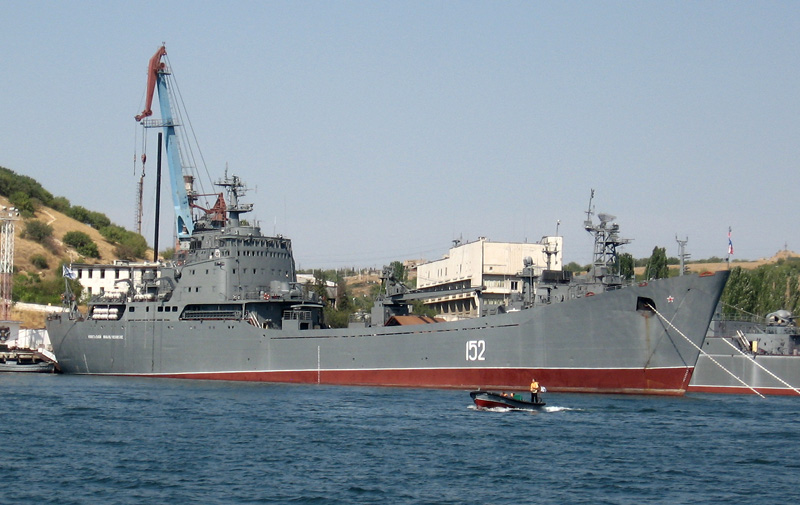
Tapir-class (Project 1171, NATO reporting name "Alligator") Large Landing Ship

- Builder:
  - Soviet Union
- Displacement:
  - 3,400 tons (standard), 4,700 tons (full load)
- Operator:
  - Russian Navy: 4 in service

Teluk Bintuni-class (LST) Tank Landing Ship

- Builder:
  - Indonesia
- Displacement:
  - 2,300 tons
- Operator:
  - Indonesian Navy: 2 in service, 7 completed

Vydra-class (Project 106) Small Landing Ship

- Builder:
  - Soviet Union
- Displacement:
  - 258 tons (standard), 550 tons (full load)
- Operators:
  - Egyptian Navy: 5 in service
  - Ukrainian Navy: 2 in service

Vydra-class (Project 106K Saygak) Small Landing Ship

- Builder:
  - Soviet Union
- Displacement:
  - 460 tons (standard), 610 tons (full load)
- Operators:
  - Azerbaijani Navy: 2 in service
  - Bulgarian Navy: 21 in service
  - Border Police of Georgia: 2 in service
  - Egyptian Navy: 10 in service
  - Ukrainian Navy: 2 in service

Yudao-class (Type 073) Medium Landing Ship

- Builder:
  - China
- Displacement:
  - 850 tons (full load)
- Operator:
  - People's Liberation Army Navy: 1 in service

Yudao-class (Type 073II) Medium Landing Ship

- Builder:
  - China
- Displacement:
  - 1,040 tons (full load)
- Operator:
  - People's Liberation Army Navy: 1 in service

Yudao-class (Type 073IIY) Medium Landing Ship

- Builder:
  - China
- Displacement:
  - 1,100 tons (full load)
- Operator:
  - People's Liberation Army Navy: 2 in service

Yudeng-class (Type 073III) Medium Landing Ship

- Builder:
  - China
- Displacement:
  - 1,460 tons (standard), 1,850 tons (full load)
- Operator:
  - People's Liberation Army Navy: 1 in service

Yuhai-class (Type 074) Medium Landing Ship

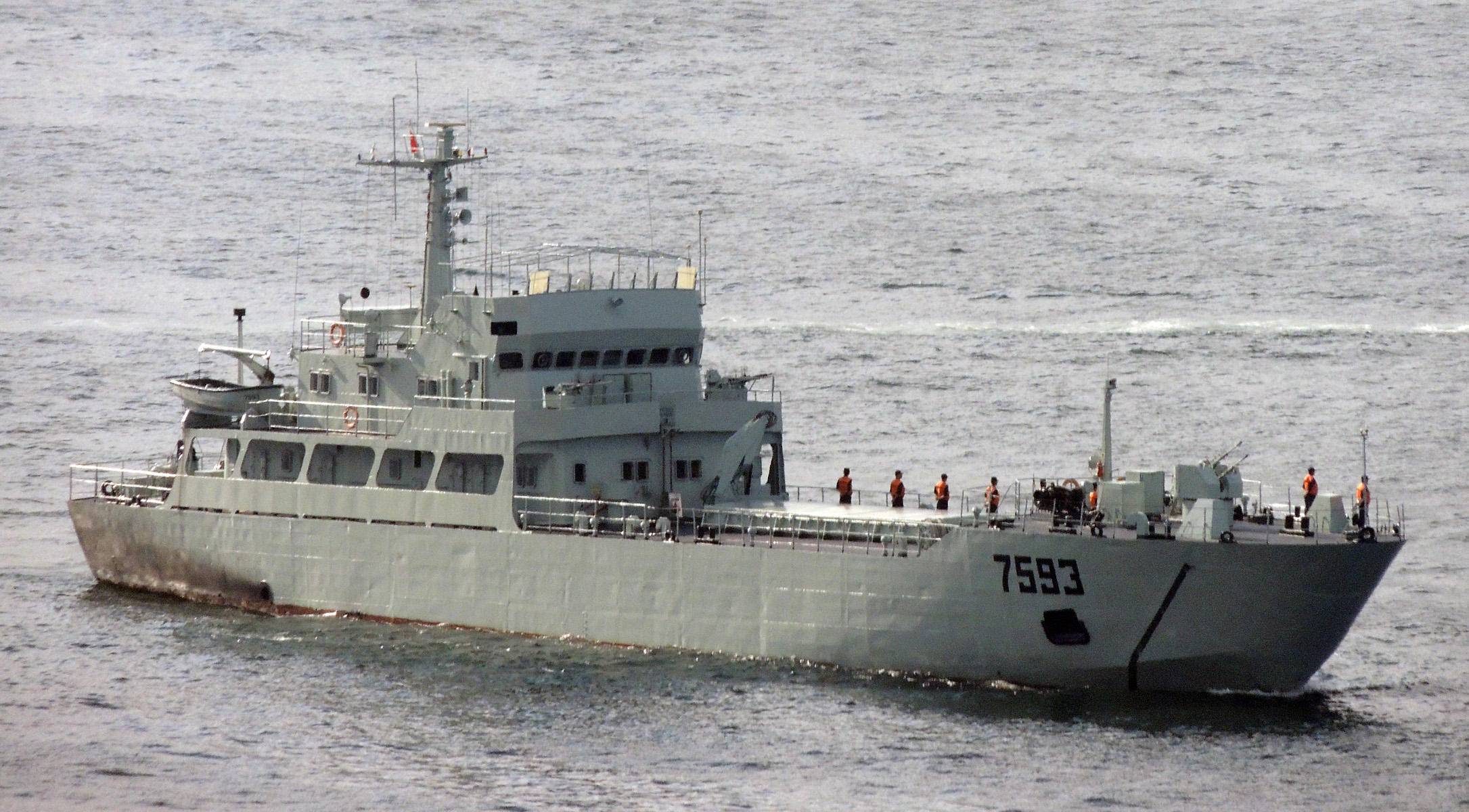
Yuhai class - (Type 074) Medium Landing Ship

- Builder:
  - China
- Displacement:
  - 800 tons (full load)
- Operator:
  - People's Liberation Army Navy: 12 in service
  - Sri Lanka Navy: 1 in service

Yunshu-class (Type 073A) Medium Landing Ship

- Builder:
  - China
- Displacement:
  - 2,000 tons (full load)
- Operator:
  - People's Liberation Army Navy: 10 in service

Yulian-class (Type 079) Medium Landing Ship

- Builder:
  - China
- Displacement:
  - 714 tons (light), 730 tons (standard), 833 tons (full load)
- Operator:
  - People's Liberation Army Navy: 23 in service

=== Air-cushioned landing craft ===
Aist-class (Project 12321, NATO reporting name "Dzheyran") Air Cushioned Landing Craft

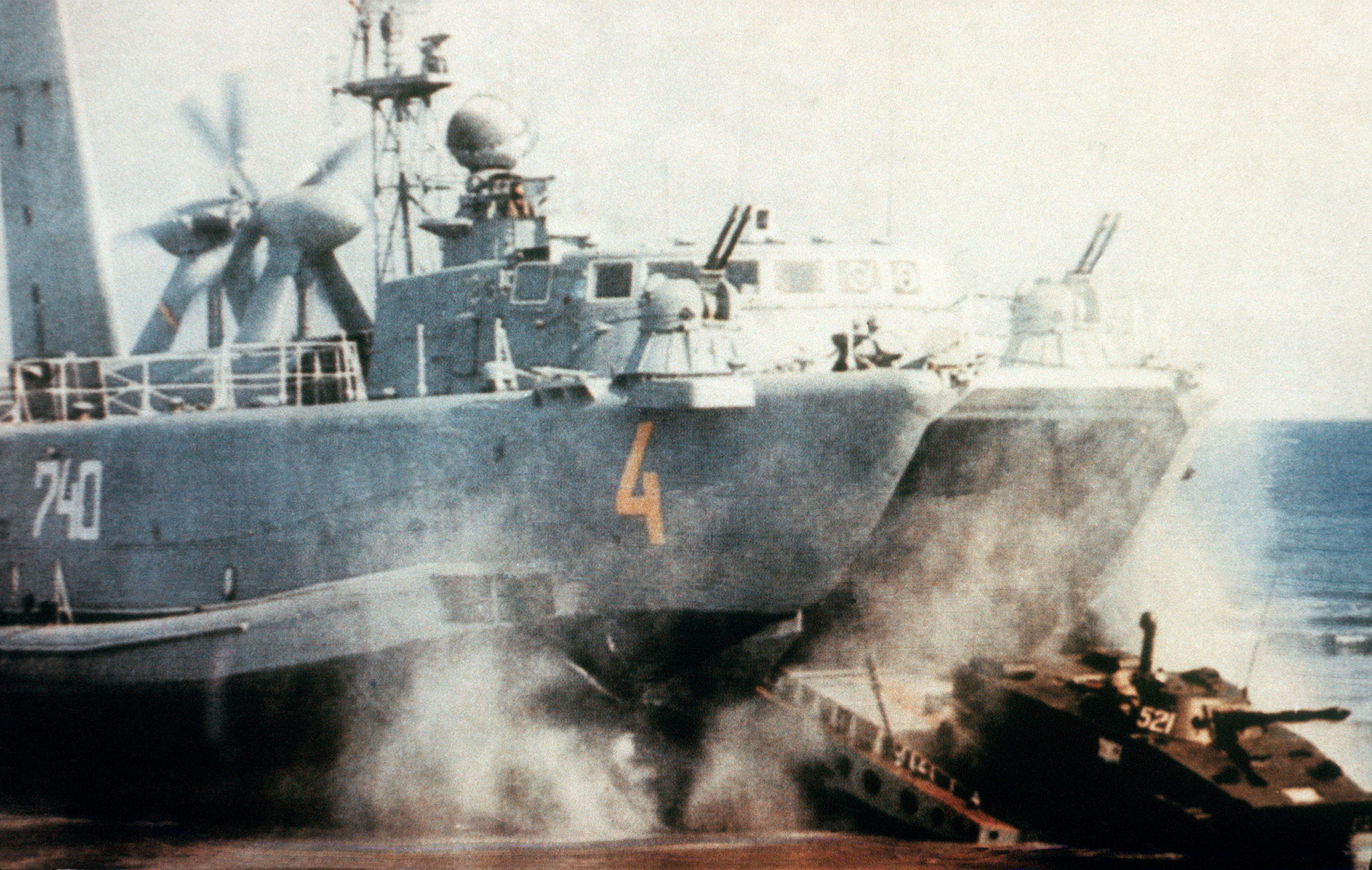
Aist-class (Project 12321, NATO reporting name "Dzheyran") Air Cushioned Landing Craft

- Builder:
  - Soviet Union
- Displacement:
  - ?
- Speed:
  - max. 70 knots (130 km/h)
- Operator:
  - Russian Navy: 6 in service

Griffon 2000TD Light-Weight Hovercraft

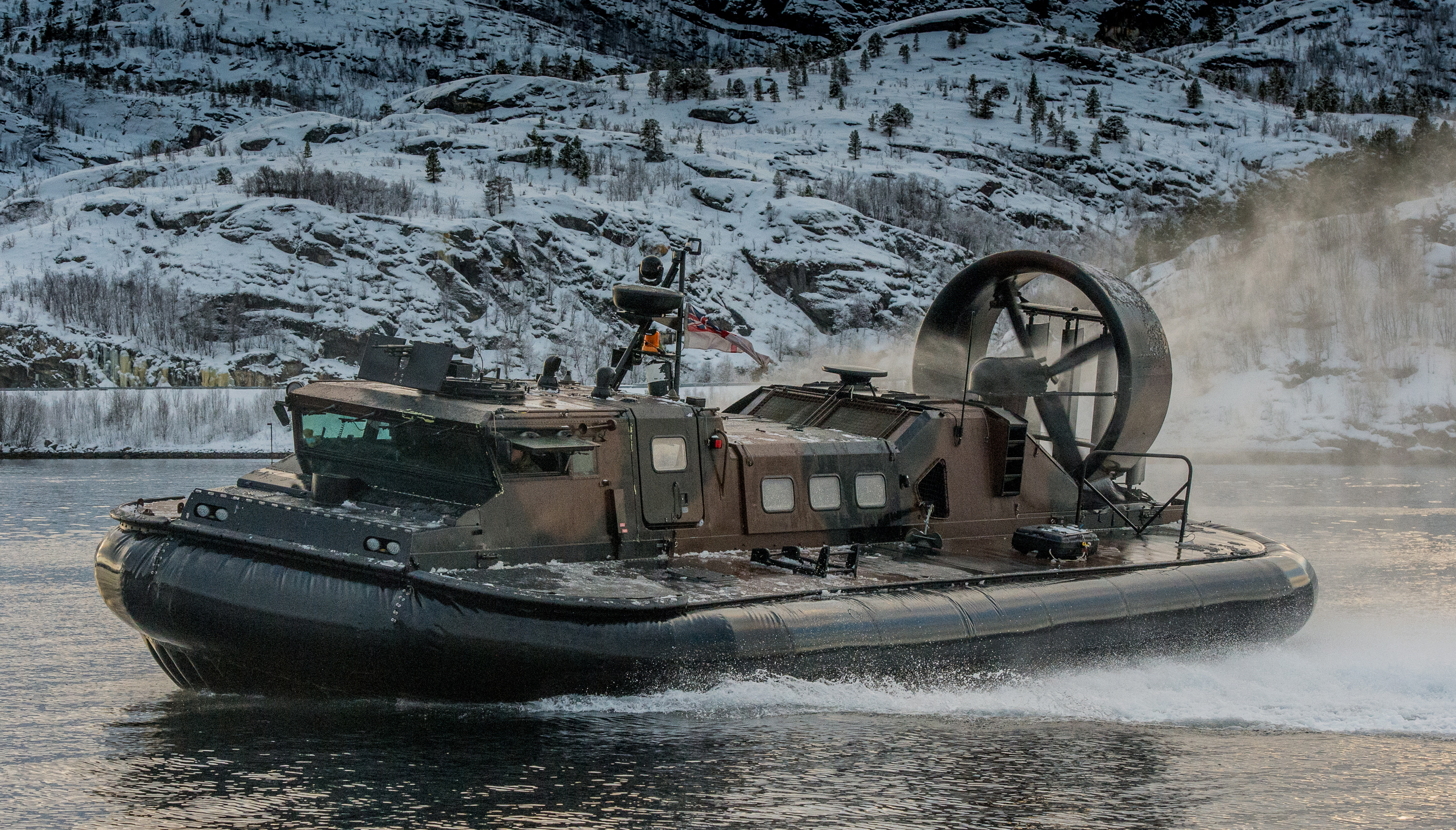
Griffon 2000TD Light-Weight Hovercraft

- Builder:
  - United Kingdom
- Displacement:
  - 3.5 tons (civilian), 6.8 tons (military)
- Speed:
  - 35 knots at sea state 3 (~65 km/h)
- Operator:
  - Belgian Land Component: 1 in service
  - Colombian National Navy: 8 in service
  - Estonia Border Guard: 1 in service
  - Finland Border Guard: 7 in service
  - Lithuania Border Guard: 1 in service
  - Pakistan Navy: 4 in service
  - Peru Marina de Guerra: 7 in service
  - Poland Border Guard: 2 in service
  - Sweden Coast Guard: 3 in service
  - United Kingdom Royal Marines: 4 in service

Landing Craft Air Cushion (LCAC) Air Cushioned Landing Craft

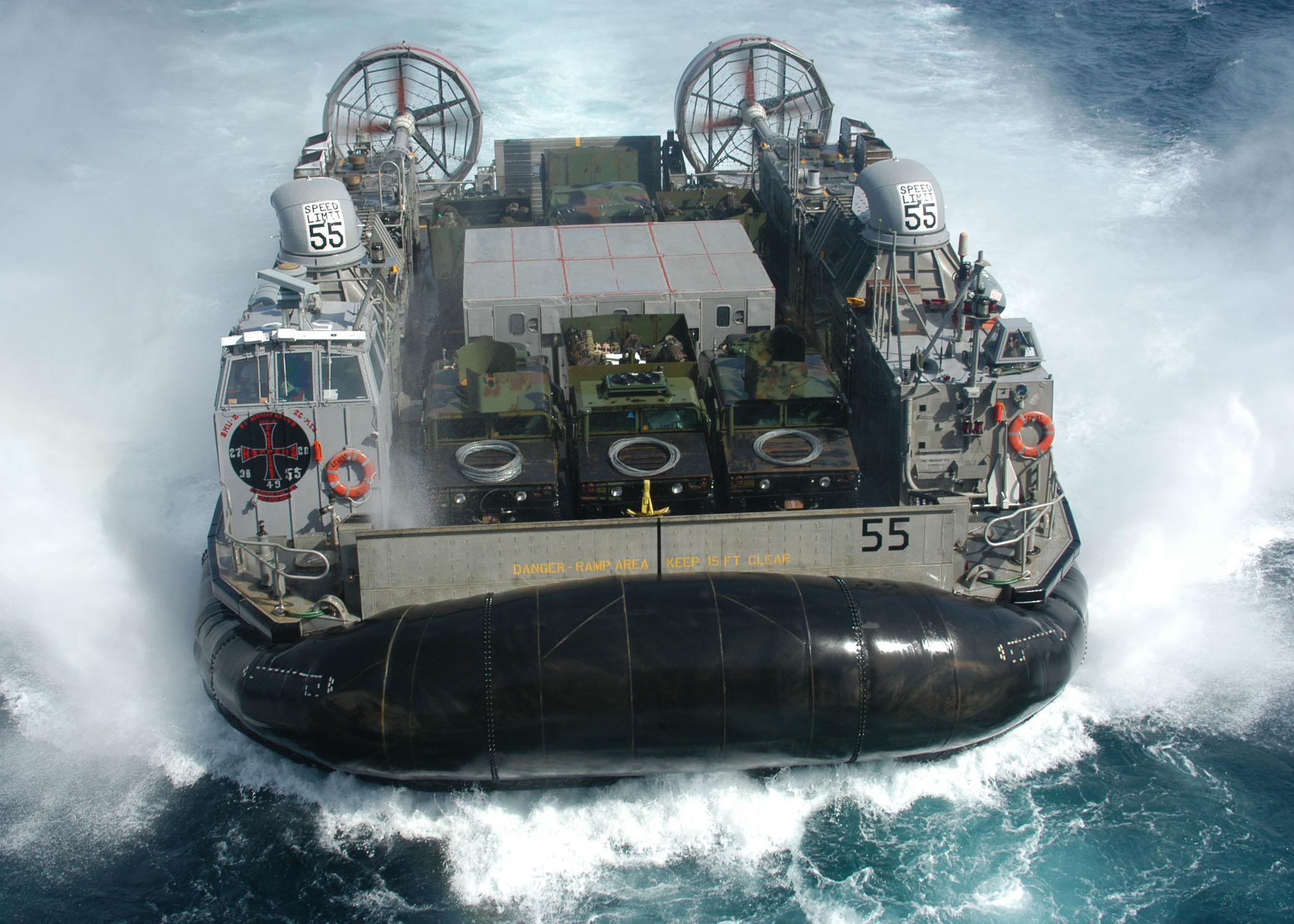
Landing Craft Air Cushion (LCAC)

- Builder:
  - United States
- Displacement:
  - 87.2 tons (light), 182 tons (full load)
- Speed:
  - max. 70+ knots (~130 km/h), full loaded 40+ knots (~74 km/h)
- Operator:
  - Japan Maritime Self-Defense Force: 6 in service
  - United States Navy: 74 in service

LSF-II 631 Solgae-class (LCAC) Air Cushioned Landing Craft

- Builder:
  - South Korea
- Displacement:
  - 157 tons (full load)
- Speed:
  - full loaded 40 knots (74 km/h)
- Operator:
  - Republic of Korea Navy: 3 in service

Zubr-class (Project 1232.2, NATO reporting name "Pomornik") Air Cushioned Landing Craft

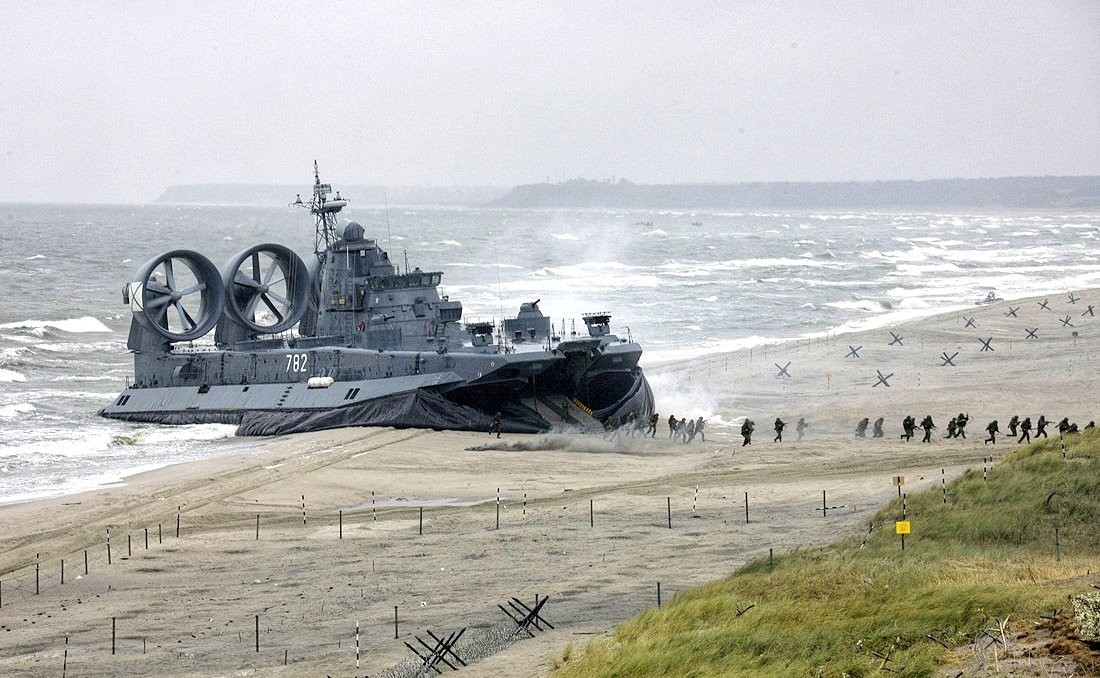
Zubr-class (Project 1232.2, NATO reporting name "Pomornik") Air Cushioned Landing Craft

- Builder:
  - Soviet Union
- Displacement:
  - 340 tons (light), 415 tons (standard), 555 tons (full load)
- Speed:
  - max. 63 knots (117 km/h), full loaded 55 knots (102 km/h)
- Operator:
  - Hellenic Navy: 4 in service
  - People's Liberation Army Navy: 2 in service
  - Russian Navy: 2 in service

== See also ==
List of submarine classes in service
