= Talbot County-class tank landing ship =

US tank landing ship class

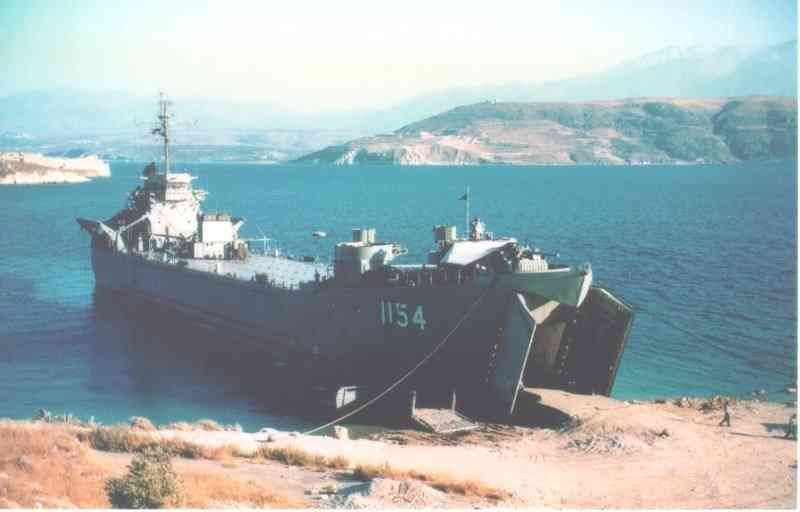
- USS Tallahatchie County

Class overview
- Name: Talbot County class
- Builders: Boston Navy Yard
- Operators: United States Navy
- Preceded by: LST(2) class
- Succeeded by: Terrebonne Parish class
- Built: 1945-1947
- In commission: 1946-1970
- Planned: 3
- Completed: 2
- Canceled: 1
- Retired: 2

General characteristics
- Type: Tank landing ship
- Displacement: 6,000 long tons (6,096 t)
- Length: 328 ft (100 m)
- Beam: 54 ft (16 m)
- Draft: 14 ft 5 in (4.39 m)
- Propulsion: 2 × 450 psi (3,100 kPa) Babcock & Wilcox boilers; 2 × Geared turbines (Westinghouse forward, General Electric aft)
- Speed: 14 knots (26 km/h; 16 mph)
- Troops: 197
- Complement: 190
- Armament: 2 × single 5"/38 caliber guns; 2 × twin Bofors 40 mm guns; 2 × single Oerlikon 20 mm cannons
- Aviation facilities: Helipad

The Talbot County-class tank landing ships was a class of tank landing ship of the United States Navy. They were the only steam-powered LSTs built.

== Ships of class ==
Pennant number	Name	Callsign	Builders	Launched	Commissioned	Decommissioned	Fate
Talbot County-class tank landing ship
LST-1153	Talbot County	NKHZ	Boston Navy Yard	24 April 1947	3 September 1947	3 April 1970	Sold to commercial service, fate unknown
LST-1154 / AVB-2	Tallahatchie County	NKIB	Boston Navy Yard	19 July 1946	24 May 1949	15 January 1970	Scrapped in July 1970
LST-1155	Cancelled						
