= USS McClung =

Amphibious warfare vessel

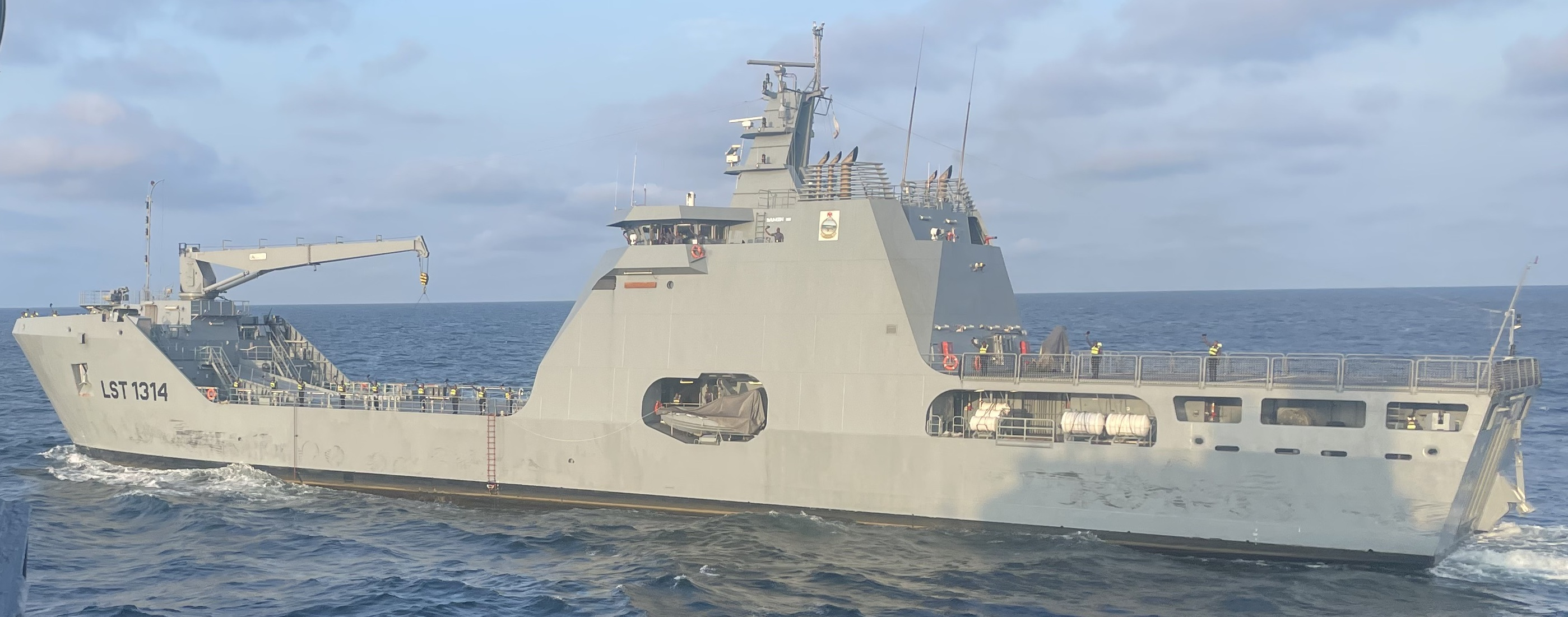
- NNS Kada of the same type.

History

United States
- Name: McClung
- Namesake: Megan McClung
- Builder: Bollinger Shipyards, Pascagoula, Mississippi
- Laid down: 2026 (planned)
- Sponsored by: Re McClung (mother) and Gabrielle McClung (niece)
- Completed: 2029 (planned)
- Identification: LSM-1
- Status: Ordered

General characteristics
- Type: Landing Ship, Tank
- Displacement: 4,000 t (3,900 long tons)
- Length: 100 m (328 ft 1 in)
- Beam: 16 m (52 ft 6 in)
- Draught: 3.5 m (11 ft 6 in)
- Speed: 15 knots (28 km/h; 17 mph) (maximum)
- Range: 3,400 nautical miles (6,300 km; 3,900 mi)
- Capacity: 500 tonnes cargo
- Troops: 250-282 troops
- Crew: 18-32
- Armament: 1× 30 mm gun (planned)
- Aviation facilities: Flight deck

USS McClung (LSM-1) is the lead ship of the McClung-class landing ship medium, a new generation of amphibious warfare vessels being developed for the United States Navy. She will be built at Bollinger Shipyards in Pascagoula, Mississippi.

== Naming ==
The ship's name was officially announced by Secretary of the Navy Carlos Del Toro on January 16, 2025. It honors Major Megan M.L. McClung, a 1995 U.S. Naval Academy graduate who was killed by an improvised explosive device in Ramadi, Iraq, on December 6, 2006.

== See also ==
- List of United States Navy Landing Ship Mediums
