= USS LST-716 =

LST-542-class of the US Navy

History

United States
- Name: LST-716
- Builder: Jeffersonville Boat & Machine Co., Jeffersonville
- Laid down: 16 June 1944
- Launched: 24 July 1944
- Sponsored by: Mrs. Nancy L. Duggins
- Commissioned: 18 August 1944
- Decommissioned: 12 June 1946
- Stricken: 12 March 1948
- Identification: Callsign: NFST
- Fate: Transferred to Republic of China Navy, 7 February 1948

Taiwan
- Name: Chung Chien; (中建)
- Acquired: 7 February 1948
- Commissioned: 7 February 1948
- Home port: Kaohsiung
- Identification: Hull number: LST-205
- Status: Active

General characteristics
- Class & type: LST-542-class tank landing ship
- Displacement: 1,625 long tons (1,651 t) (light); 4,080 long tons (4,145 t) (full (seagoing draft with 1,675 short tons (1,520 t) load); 2,366 long tons (2,404 t) (beaching)
- Length: 328 ft (100 m) oa
- Beam: 50 ft (15 m)
- Draft: Unloaded: 2 ft 4 in (0.71 m) forward; 7 ft 6 in (2.29 m) aft; Full load: 8 ft 3 in (2.51 m) forward; 14 ft 1 in (4.29 m) aft; Landing with 500 short tons (450 t) load: 3 ft 11 in (1.19 m) forward; 9 ft 10 in (3.00 m) aft; Limiting 11 ft 2 in (3.40 m); Maximum navigation 14 ft 1 in (4.29 m)
- Installed power: 2 × 900 hp (670 kW) Electro-Motive Diesel 12-567A diesel engines; 1,800 shp (1,300 kW)
- Propulsion: 1 × Falk main reduction gears; 2 × Propellers
- Speed: 11.6 kn (21.5 km/h; 13.3 mph)
- Range: 24,000 nmi (44,000 km; 28,000 mi) at 9 kn (17 km/h; 10 mph) while displacing 3,960 long tons (4,024 t)
- Boats & landing craft carried: 2 x LCVPs
- Capacity: 1,600–1,900 short tons (3,200,000–3,800,000 lb; 1,500,000–1,700,000 kg) cargo depending on mission
- Troops: 16 officers, 147 enlisted men
- Complement: 7 officers, 104 enlisted men
- Armament: Varied, ultimate armament; 2 × twin 40 mm (1.57 in) Bofors guns; 4 × single 40 mm Bofors guns; 12 × 20 mm (0.79 in) Oerlikon cannons
- Aviation facilities: Deck as helipad

USS LST-716 was an LST-542-class tank landing ship in the United States Navy during World War II. She was transferred to the Republic of China Navy as ROCS Chung Chien (LST-205).

== Construction and career ==
LST-716 was laid down on 16 June 1944 at Jeffersonville Boat & Machine Co., Jeffersonville, Indiana. Launched on 24 July 1944 and commissioned on 18 August 1944.

=== Service in the United States Navy ===
During World War II, LST-716 was assigned to the Asiatic-Pacific theater and participated in the assault and occupation of Iwo Jima from 19 to 26 February and Okinawa Gunto from 2 May and 30 June 1945. Following the war, LST-716 performed occupation duty in the Far East until mid-September 1945. She returned to the United States and was decommissioned and transferred to United States Army on 12 June 1946.

Under the Lend-Lease Act, she was transferred to the Republic of China on 7 February 1948, and served the ROC navy as Chung Chien (LST-205).

LST-716 earned two battle star for World War II service.

=== Service in the Republic of China Navy ===
On 1 June 2018, ROCS Chung Jian and ROCS Chong He conducted a training maneuver.

== Gallery ==
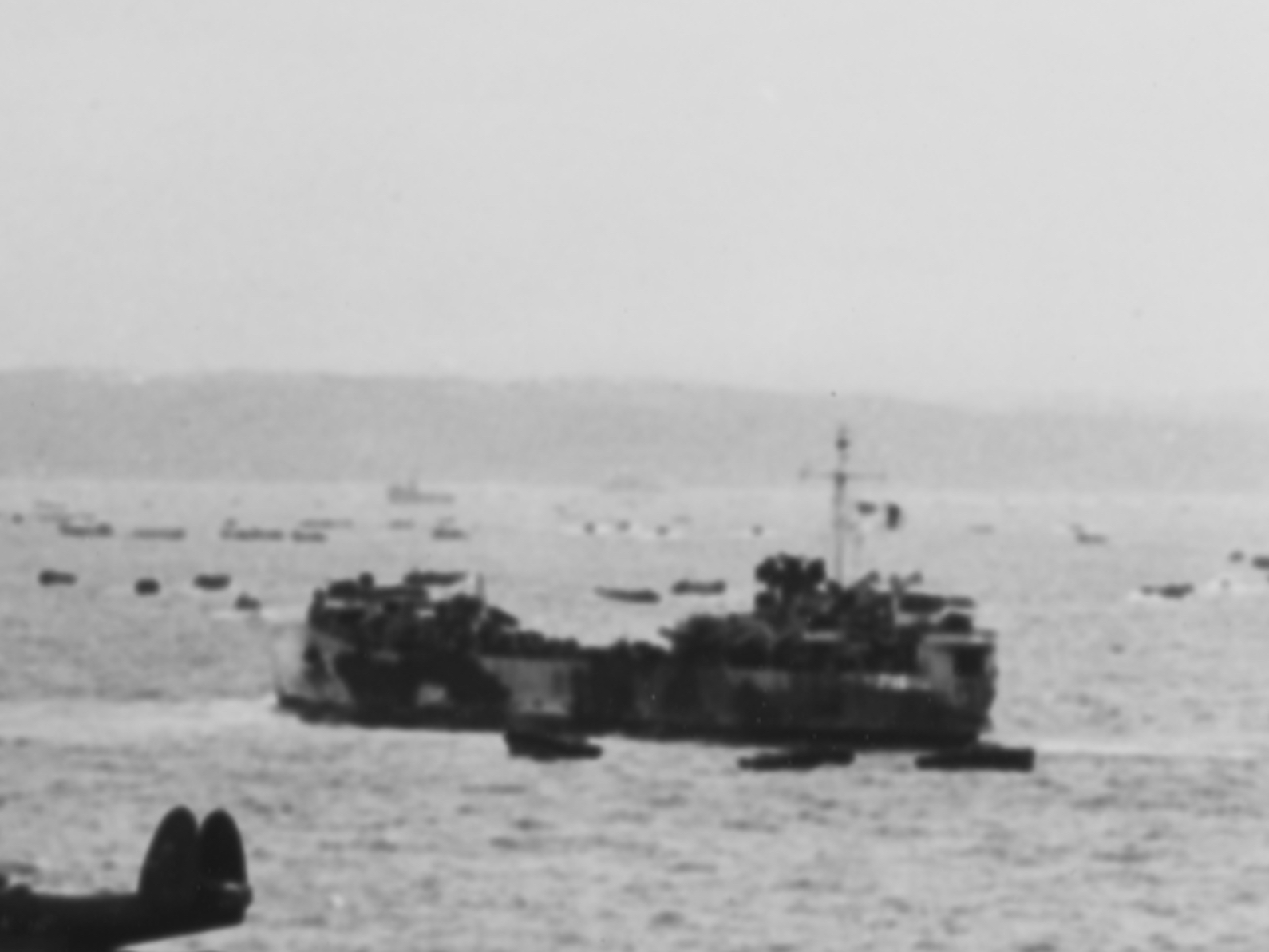
USS LST-716 on 20 February 1945

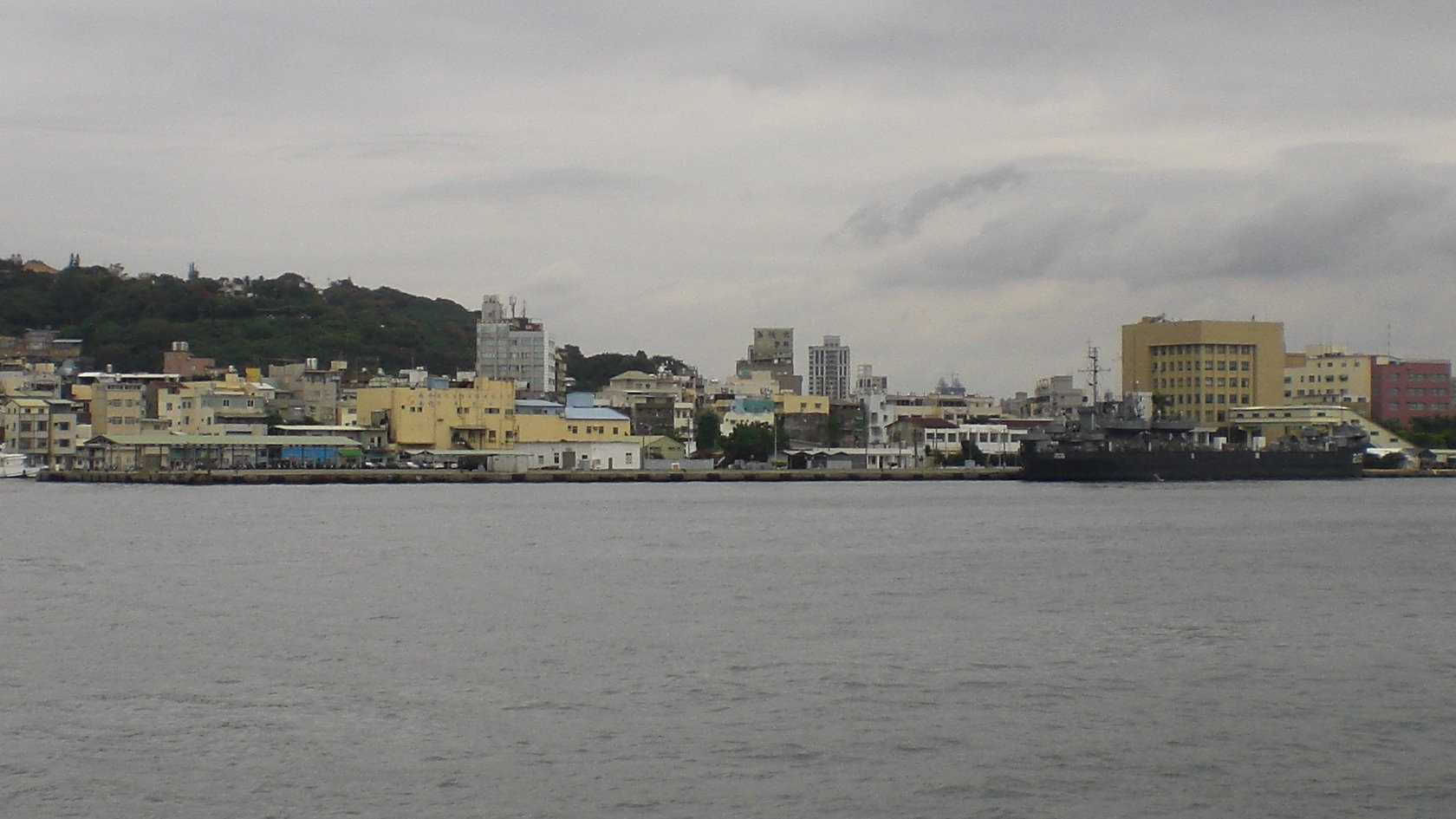
ROCS Chung Chien on 17 May 2013
