= USS LST-467 =

LST-1-class tank landing ship

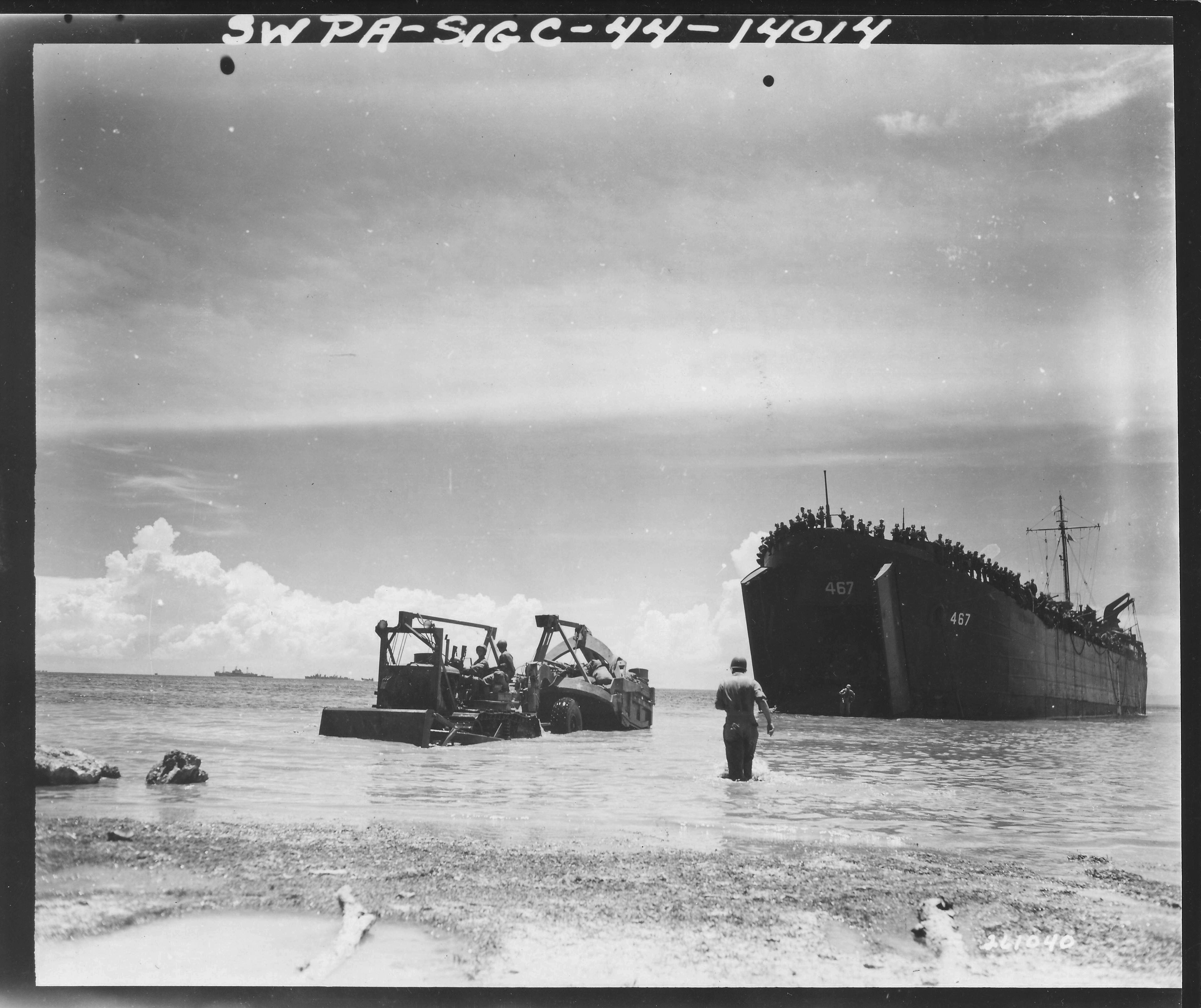
- USS LST-467, beached at Morotai, Netherlands East Indies, 15 September 1944, as an armored bulldozer makes its way through the water in order to reach the jungle where a road will be built leading to an airstrip.

History

United States
- Name: LST-467
- Ordered: as a Type S3-M-K2 hull, MCE hull 987
- Builder: Kaiser Shipbuilding Company, Vancouver, Washington
- Yard number: 171
- Laid down: 17 October 1942
- Launched: 21 November 1942
- Commissioned: 3 March 1943
- Decommissioned: 28 May 1946
- Stricken: 5 June 1946
- Identification: IMO number: 5119923; Hull symbol: LST-467; Code letters: NFSY
- Honors and awards: 8 × battle stars
- Fate: Sold, 22 November 1946
- Name: Ampower Corp
- Name: Frank J Humphrey
- Name: WIT Shoal II
- Operator: West Indies Trading Company
- Fate: Sunk, 6 November 1984

General characteristics
- Class & type: LST-1-class tank landing ship
- Displacement: 4,080 long tons (4,145 t) full load; 2,160 long tons (2,190 t) landing
- Length: 328 ft (100 m) oa
- Beam: 50 ft (15 m)
- Draft: Full load: 8 ft 2 in (2.49 m) forward; 14 ft 1 in (4.29 m) aft; Landing at 2,160 t: 3 ft 11 in (1.19 m) forward; 9 ft 10 in (3.00 m) aft
- Installed power: 2 × 900 hp (670 kW) Electro-Motive Diesel 12-567A diesel engines; 1,700 shp (1,300 kW)
- Propulsion: 1 × Falk main reduction gears; 2 × Propellers
- Speed: 12 kn (22 km/h; 14 mph)
- Range: 24,000 nmi (44,000 km; 28,000 mi) at 9 kn (17 km/h; 10 mph) while displacing 3,960 long tons (4,024 t)
- Boats & landing craft carried: 2 or 6 x LCVPs
- Capacity: 2,100 tons oceangoing maximum; 350 tons main deckload
- Troops: 16 officers, 147 enlisted men
- Complement: 13 officers, 104 enlisted men
- Armament: Varied, ultimate armament; 2 × twin 40 mm (1.57 in) Bofors guns; 4 × single 40 mm Bofors guns; 12 × 20 mm (0.79 in) Oerlikon cannons

Service record
- Part of: LST Flotilla 7
- Operations: Eastern New Guinea operations; Lae occupation (4–5 September 1943); Bismarck Archipelago operations; Cape Gloucester, New Britain (26–29 December 1943, 21–25 February 1944); Hollandia operation (21–26 April 1944); Western New Guinea operations; Toem-Wakde-Sarmi area operation (21–23 and 27–29 May 1944); Biak Islands operation (6–10 and 16–20 June 1944); Noemfoor Island operation (30 June–4 July, 9–14 July 1944); Cape Sansapor operation (16–22 August 1944); Morotai landing (15 September 1944); Leyte landings (13–27 October, 5–18 November 1944); Lingayen Gulf landings (4–15 January 1945); Consolidation and capture of Southern Philippines; Palawan Island landings (1–2 March 1945); Visayan Island landings (25 March 1945); Borneo operations; Tarakan Island operation (27 April–5 May 1945)
- Awards: Navy Unit Commendation; American Campaign Medal; Asiatic–Pacific Campaign Medal; World War II Victory Medal; Philippine Republic Presidential Unit Citation; Philippine Liberation Medal

USS LST-467 was a United States Navy LST-1-class tank landing ship used in the Asiatic-Pacific Theater during World War II. As with many of her class, the ship was never named. Instead, she was referred to by her hull designation.

== Construction ==
The ship was laid down on 17 October 1942, under Maritime Commission (MARCOM) contract, MC hull 987, by Kaiser Shipyards, Vancouver, Washington; launched 21 November 1942; and commissioned on 3 March 1943.

== Service history ==
During World War II, LST-467 was assigned to the Asiatic-Pacific theater. She took part in the Eastern New Guinea operation, the Lae occupation in September 1943; the Bismarck Archipelago operation, the Cape Gloucester, New Britain landings from December 1943 through February 1944; Hollandia operation in April 1944; the Western New Guinea operations, the Toem-Wakde-Sarmi area operation in May 1944, the Biak Islands operation in June 1944, the Noemfoor Island operation in June and July 1944, the Cape Sansapor operation in August 1944, and the Morotai landing in September 1944; the Leyte operation in October and November 1944; the Lingayen Gulf landings in January 1945; the consolidation and capture of the Southern Philippines, the Palawan Island landings in March 1945, the Visayan Island landings in March 1945; and the Borneo operation, the Tarakan Island operation in April and May 1945.

Following the war, LST-467 returned to the United States and was decommissioned on 28 May 1946, and struck from the Navy list on 5 June 1946. On 22 November 1946, the tank landing ship was sold to the National Metal & Steel Corp., Terminal Island, California.

She was later resold to the St. Charles Transportation Co., which was a subsidiary of Anglo Canadian Pulp and Paper Mills, of Montreal, Quebec. She was modified by Davie Shipbuilding & Repairing Co., of Lauzon, Quebec, for use as a log hauler.

She was later either renamed Ampower Corp or was bought by Ampower Corp before being renamed Frank J. Humphrey. By 1984, she was owned by the West Indies Trading Company, renamed WIT Shoal II and was being used as an inter island freighter in the Caribbean. On 6 November 1984, she was in Krum Bay, near Charlotte Amalie West, U.S. Virgin Islands, when she was wrecked by Tropical Storm Klaus. She was later patched and raised so she could be towed to Puerto Rico for scrapping. In May 1985, while being towed to Puerto Rico, one of the patches broke loose and the tow lines had to be cut. She sank 2.2 miles (3.5 km) west of Saba Island at 18.3061833°N 65.0364833°W. She sits in 90 feet (27 m) of water and is a popular dive site.

== Honors and awards ==
LST-467 earned eight battle stars for her World War II service.

== Bibliography ==
Online resources

- "LST-467". Dictionary of American Naval Fighting Ships. Naval History and Heritage Command. This article incorporates text from this source, which is in the public domain.
- "Kaiser Vancouver, Vancouver WA". www.ShipbuildingHistory.com. 27 November 2010.
- "USS LST-467". NavSource. 26 September 2015.
- "WITSHOAL II". MarineTraffic.com. 16 February 2017.
- "History of the WIT Shoal II / LST 467". BlueIslandDivers.com.
