= USS Talbot County =

Tank landing ship of the US Navy

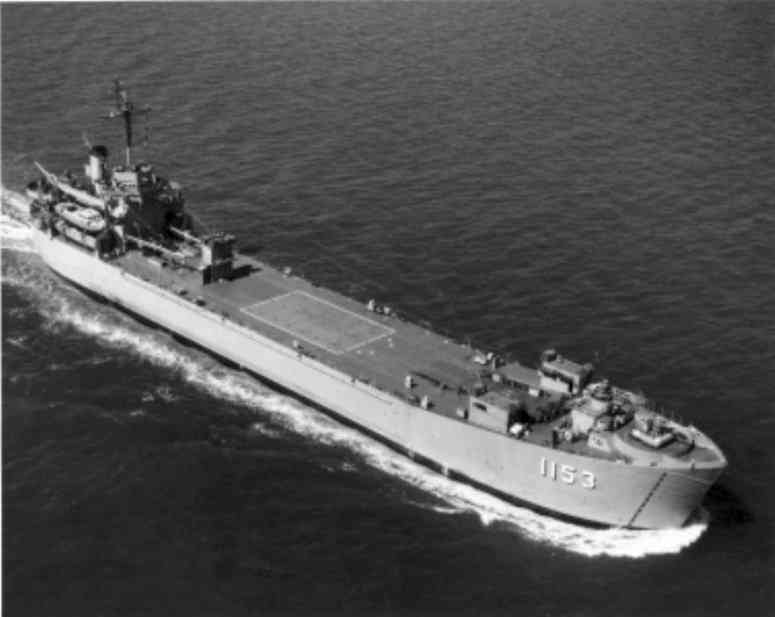
- LST-1153 underway

History

United States
- Name: USS LST-1153
- Builder: Boston Navy Yard, Massachusetts
- Laid down: 19 July 1945
- Launched: 24 April 1947
- Commissioned: 3 September 1947
- Decommissioned: 3 April 1970
- Renamed: USS Talbot County (LST-1153), 1 July 1955
- Stricken: 1 May 1973
- Fate: Sold for scrapping

General characteristics
- Class & type: Talbot County-class tank landing ship
- Displacement: 6,000 long tons (6,096 t)
- Length: 382 ft (116 m)
- Beam: 54 ft (16 m)
- Draft: 14 ft 5 in (4.39 m)
- Propulsion: 2 × 450 psi (3,100 kPa) Babcock & Wilcox boilers; 2 geared turbines, (forward engine room, Westinghouse, after engine room General Electric)
- Speed: 14 knots (26 km/h; 16 mph)
- Boats & landing craft carried: 3 × LCVPs; 1 × LCPL
- Troops: 197
- Complement: 190
- Armament: 2 × single 5-inch/38-caliber guns; 2 × twin 40 mm guns; 2 × single 20 mm guns; (The 20 & 40 mm guns were removed prior to 1958)

USS Talbot County (LST-1153) was a tank landing ship (LST) built for the United States Navy just after World War II. The lead ship of her class of only two vessels, she was named after counties in Maryland and Georgia, and was the only U.S. Naval vessel to bear the name.

== Design and construction ==
The two Talbot County class tank landing ships had a displacement of 6,000 long tons (6,096 t), a length of 382 feet (116 m), a beam of 54 feet (16 m), and a draft of 14 feet 5 inches (4.39 m). They were fitted with two 450 psi (3,100 kPa) Babcock & Wilcox boilers connected to two geared turbines; a Westinghouse in the forward engine room, and a General Electric in the after engine room. These were intended to provide a top speed of 14 knots (26 km/h; 16 mph), although 12 knots (22 km/h; 14 mph) was a more realistic flank speed.

The landing ships were capable of transporting 197 troops, and were equipped with three LCVPs and one LCPL. The ship's company was 190-strong, and consisted of about six or seven line officers, a supply officer, the Captain and Executive Officer, and about 115–125 enlisted men. Talbot County was initially armed with two single 5-inch/38-caliber guns, two twin 40 mm Bofors guns, and two single 20 mm Oerlikon guns. The 20 mm and 40 mm guns were removed prior to 1958.

The ship was laid down as LST-1153 on 19 July 1945 at the Boston Navy Yard. She was launched on 24 April 1947 with Mrs. Lena Mickelson as sponsor, and commissioned on 3 September 1947. She was not named until 1955.

The Talbot County and her sister-ship, Tallahatchie County (LST-1154), were the only steam-driven LST's ever commissioned into the United States Navy, and were considered experimental due to their propulsion and armament. Apparently the experiment was not a success because no other steam driven LST's were ever built and no others had 5-inch guns.

== Service history ==
=== 1947–1970 ===
LST-1153 reported to the Fleet Training Group at Norfolk to begin her shakedown cruise on 21 September. She returned to Boston on 24 October for a post-shakedown yard period and put to sea again on 15 November. Eleven days later, she arrived at her home port, Little Creek, Virginia.

For the next nine years, as a unit of the Amphibious Force, Atlantic Fleet, the tank landing ship operated along the east coast of the United States from New England to Florida and in the Caribbean. On 1 July 1955, LST-1153 was named USS Talbot County (LST-1153).

Talbot County deployed to the Mediterranean on 31 August 1959, using her bulk fuel tanks to carry more than 240,000 gallons of aviation gasoline to refuel the helicopters of the amphibious squadron attached to the Sixth Fleet. After making port calls in France, Italy, Greece, Malta, Gibraltar, Algeria, and Morocco, she returned to the United States on 13 February 1958. The ship was deployed with the Sixth Fleet again from April to August 1959 and from October 1960 to May 1961. The remainder of her time, until 1970, was spent in operations along the Atlantic seaboard, ranging from Key West, Florida, to Nova Scotia and various ports in the Caribbean.

=== Decommissioning and sale ===
Talbot County was decommissioned on 3 April 1970 and assigned to the Atlantic Reserve Fleet at Orange, Texas. Struck from the Naval Vessel Register on 1 May 1973, Talbot County was sold for scrapping by the Defense Reutilization and Marketing Service one year later, on 1 May 1974.

== See also ==
- List of United States Navy LSTs
