= USS Sublette County =

LST-542-class landing ship tank

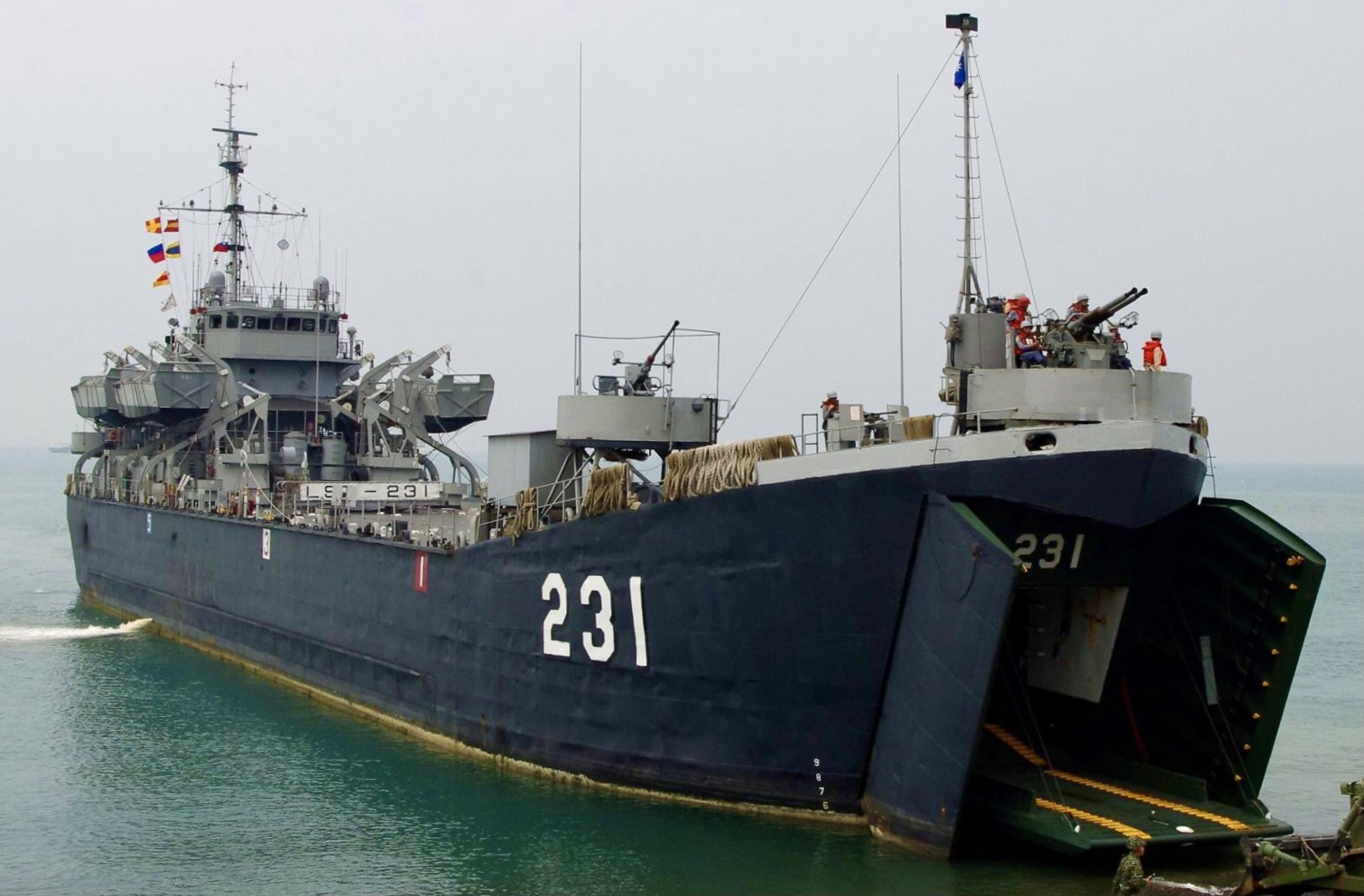
- ROCS Chung Yeh

History

United States
- Name: LST-1144
- Builder: Chicago Bridge and Iron Co., Seneca
- Laid down: 3 February 1945
- Launched: 2 May 1945
- Sponsored by: Mrs. Evelyn B. Adams
- Commissioned: 28 May 1945
- Decommissioned: 11 February 1955
- Namesake: Sublette County
- Renamed: Sublette County
- Stricken: 1 June 1960
- Identification: Pennant number: LST-1144
- Fate: Transferred to the Republic of China, 1961

Taiwan
- Name: Chung Yeh; (中業)
- Acquired: September 1961
- Commissioned: 21 September 1961
- Home port: Kaohsiung
- Identification: Pennant number: LST-231
- Status: Active

General characteristics
- Class & type: LST-542-class tank landing ship
- Displacement: 1,625 long tons (1,651 t) light; 4,080 long tons (4,145 t) full
- Length: 328 ft (100 m)
- Beam: 50 ft (15 m)
- Draft: Unloaded : 2 ft 4 in (0.71 m) forward; 7 ft 6 in (2.29 m) aft; Loaded : 8 ft 2 in (2.49 m) forward; 14 ft 1 in (4.29 m) aft
- Propulsion: 2 × General Motors 12-567 diesel engines, two shafts, twin rudders
- Speed: 12 knots (22 km/h; 14 mph)
- Boats & landing craft carried: 2 × LCVPs
- Troops: 16 officers, 147 enlisted men
- Complement: 7 officers, 104 enlisted men
- Armament: 8 × 40 mm guns; 12 × 20 mm guns

USS Sublette County (LST-1144) was a LST-542-class tank landing ship in the United States Navy during World War II. She was transferred to the Republic of China Navy as ROCS Chung Yeh (LST-231).

== Construction and commissioning ==
LST-1144 was laid down on 3 February 1945 at Chicago Bridge and Iron Company, Seneca, Illinois. Launched on 2 May 1945 and commissioned on 28 May 1945.

=== Service in United States Navy ===
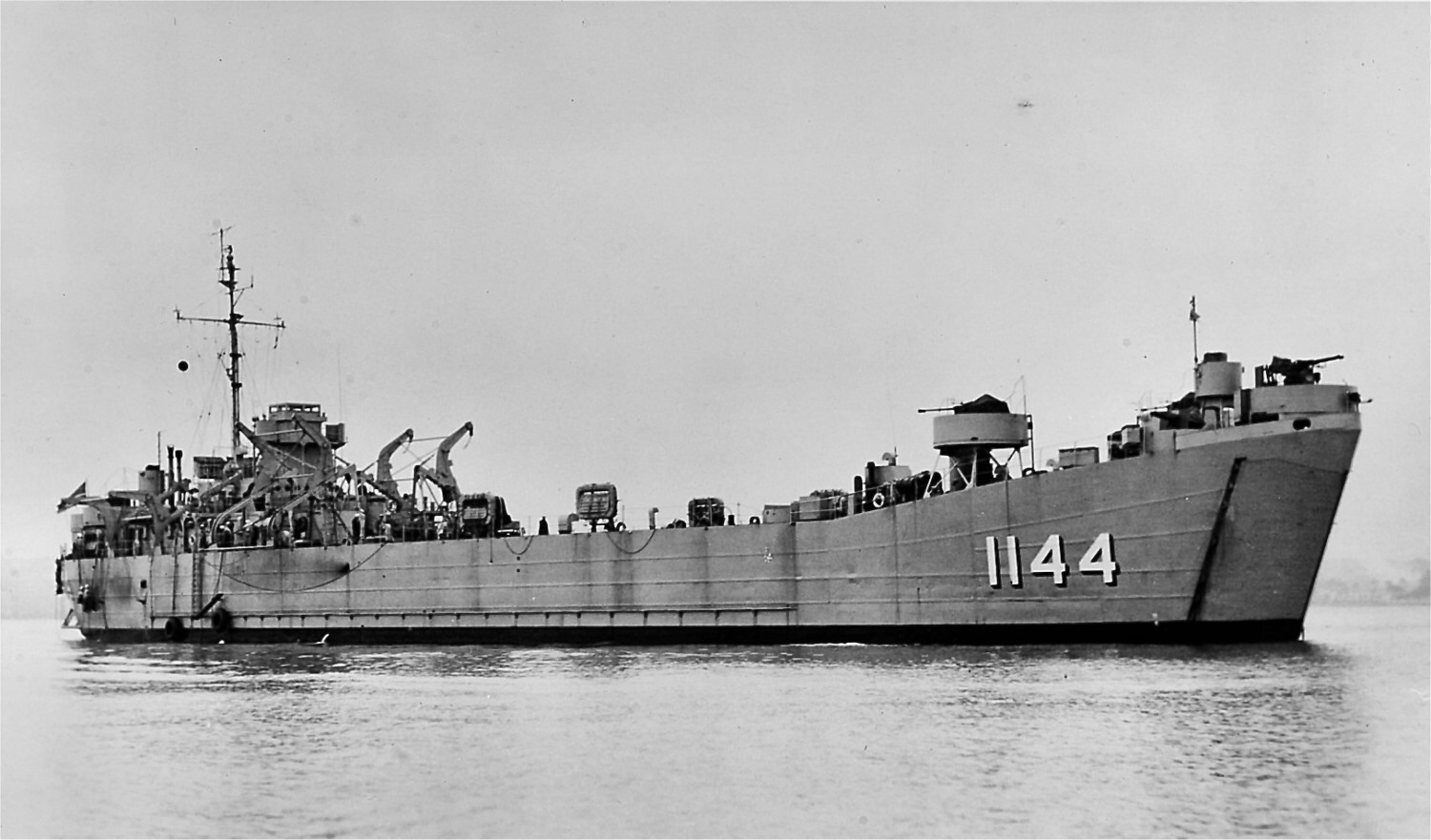
Sublette County in the 1950s

During World War II, LST-1144 was assigned to the Atlantic Fleet. She was assigned to occupation and Europe from 19 January to 5 May 1951, 17 October 1951 to 26 January 1952 and 14 January to 22 June 1953.

She was decommissioned on 11 February 1955 and struck from the Naval Register on 1 June 1960 after she was transferred to the Republic of China and renamed Chung Yeh (LST-231). While being mothballed on 1 July 1955, she was given the name Sublette County.

=== Service in Republic of China Navy ===
She participated in multiple naval exercises throughout the years.

== Awards ==
LST-1144 have earned the following awards:

- American Campaign Medal
- National Defense Service Medal
- World War II Victory Medal
- Navy Occupation Service Medal (with Europe clasp)

== Sources ==
- United States. Dept. of the Treasury (1962). Treasury Decisions Under the Customs, Internal Revenue, Industrial Alcohol, Narcotic and Other Laws, Volume 97. U.S. Government Printing Office.
- Moore, Capt. John (1984). Jane's Fighting Ships 1984-85. Jane's Information Group. ISBN 978-0710607959.
- Saunders, Stephen (2009). Jane's Fighting Ships 2009-2010. Jane's Information Group. ISBN 978-0710628886.
- Fairplay International Shipping Journal Volume 222. United Kingdom: Fairplay Publishing Limited. 1967.
