= NNS Kada =

Nigerian Navy amphibious warship

- Kada at transit through the Gulf of Guinea

History

Nigeria
- Name: Kada
- Namesake: "Crocodile" (Kada) in Hausa language
- Builder: Damen Group, Sharjah, United Arab Emirates
- Launched: 2021
- Commissioned: 21 May 2023
- Motto: "Valour and Arms"
- Status: In service
- Badge

General characteristics
- Class & type: Damen LST 100
- Displacement: 1,300 long tons (1,321 t) full load
- Length: 100 m (328 ft 1 in) oa
- Beam: 16 m (52 ft 6 in)
- Draught: 3.85 m (12 ft 8 in)
- Propulsion: 2 × Caterpillar 3516 diesel engines; 2,350 kW (3,150 shp) at 1,800 rpm; 2 × controllable pitch propellers
- Speed: 16 knots (30 km/h)
- Range: 4,000 nmi (7,400 km) at 15 knots (28 km/h)
- Complement: 18 crew, plus up to 264 embarked
- Aircraft carried: Up to 1 × helicopter
- Notes: All specifications are from the constructor

NNS Kada is a Damen LST 100 amphibious warship of the Nigerian Navy.

== Background and construction ==
The Nigerian government launched the process to acquire the future Kada in December 2017. Bids were received from the Netherlands' Damen Group, Turkey's Anadolu Shipyard, and India's Goa Shipyard. It would replace two Type 502 amphibious warships built by Howaldtswerke-Deutsche Werft and delivered in 1978.

Nigeria ordered Kada in 2019 from Damen. It was constructed at the Albwardy Damen shipyard in Sharjah, United Arab Emirates; launched in 2021; delivered to Nigeria in 2022; and commissioned into the Nigerian Navy on 21 May 2023.

According to Janes Information Services, the Nigerian Navy intended to use the ship for the "strategic transport of equipment and troops, humanitarian assistance and disaster relief operations, and to project maritime security into the Gulf of Guinea."

== Service history ==
In August 2022, the Nigerian government deployed Kada to Guinea-Bissau in the wake of a coup attempt. As part of a Economic Community of West African States (ECOWAS)-led stabilization support mission, Kada transported troops and light armored vehicles to support Guinea-Bissau's government. Between 2022 and 2026, the ship was utilized in a number of naval drills and other ECOWAS deployments. This included a 2025 exercise that practiced responses to various maritime crimes and attacks on maritime infrastructure. In May 2026, amidst celebrations marking the Nigerian Navy's 70th anniversary, the ship hosted 1,500 civilians for a three-hour cruise.

In 2025 and 2026, the Nigerian government allowed military delegations from the United States and Australia (respectively) to see if the Damen LST 100 design was suitable for their needs. The United States selected the design for further design development, and their ships will be known as the McClung-class landing ship medium; as of 2026, Australia was still mulling what will replace its Balikpapan-class landing craft.
