= Damen LST 100 =

Landing Ship Tank (LST) design by Damen Group

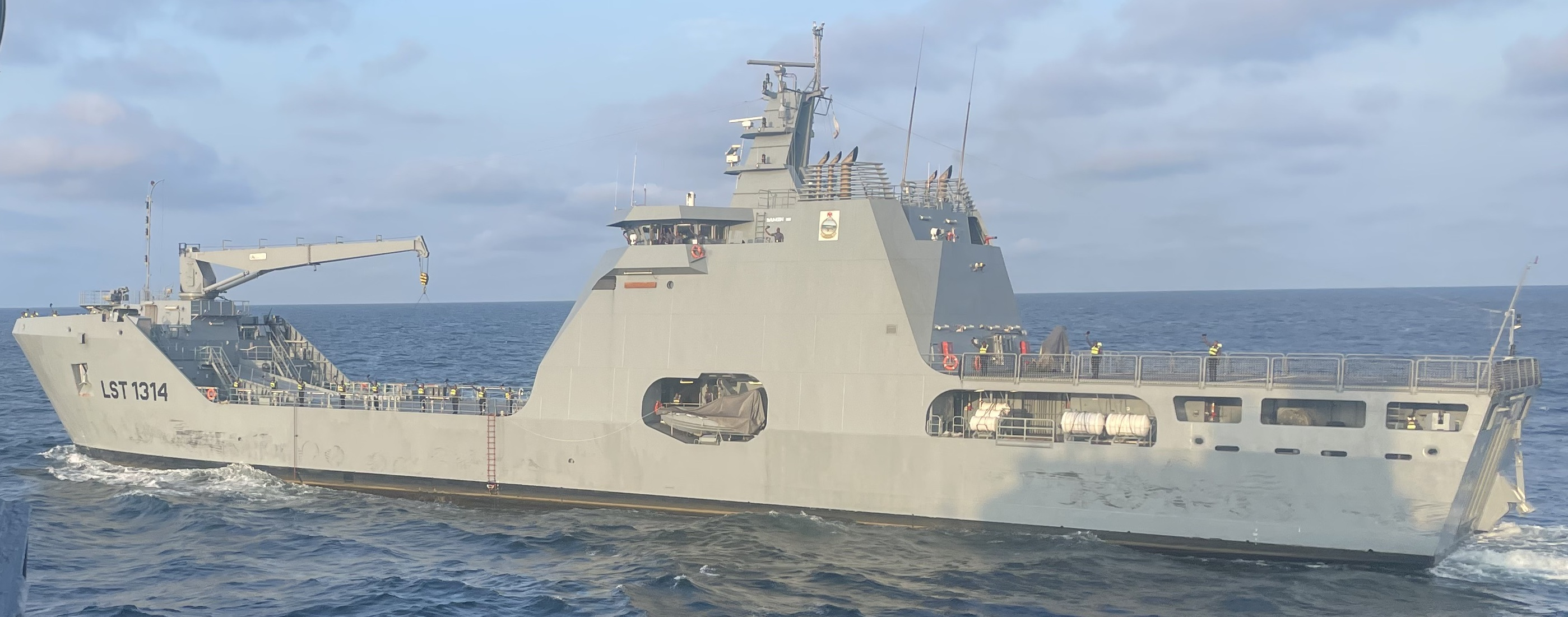
- NNS Kada during operation Guinex-III

Class overview
- Builders: Albwardy Damen Sharjah (for NN); Austal (for ARA); TBD (for USN)
- Operators: Current: Nigerian Navy; Future: Australian Army; United States Navy
- Subclasses: McClung class (USN)
- Built: 2019-present
- In commission: 2022-present
- Planned: 45
- Active: 1

General characteristics
- Type: Landing Ship, Tank
- Displacement: 4,000 t (3,900 long tons)
- Length: 100 m (328 ft 1 in)
- Beam: 16 m (52 ft 6 in)
- Draught: 3.5 m (11 ft 6 in)
- Speed: 15 knots (28 km/h; 17 mph) (maximum)
- Range: 3,400 nautical miles (6,300 km; 3,900 mi)
- Boats & landing craft carried: 2 in davits on foredeck (optional)
- Capacity: 500 tonnes cargo
- Troops: 250-282 troops
- Crew: 18-32
- Aviation facilities: Flight deck

The Damen LST 100 is a class of Landing Ship, Tank designed by the Dutch Damen Group. It is a versatile, non-developmental, sea-going vessel intended for amphibious operations, troop and vehicle transport, and humanitarian assistance. In late 2025, the design gained international prominence when it was selected as the basis for the United States Navy's McClung-class landing ship medium.

== Design and development ==
LST 100 was developed as part of Damen Group's amphibious series, a range of standardized vessels (from 40 to 120 meters) designed to reduce costs and construction timelines through modularity. Unlike "clean-sheet" military designs, LST 100 was engineered as a non-developmental, sea-going vessel, meaning it was designed for immediate production using proven commercial shipbuilding standards adapted for naval use.

Some key features are:

- Beachability: The vessel is designed to beach itself on unimproved shorelines, using clam doors and a ramp to offload heavy equipment and personnel directly onto land.
- Cargo Capacity: It features approximately 1,020 m^{2} (11,000 sq ft) of roll-on/roll-off space. It can carry over 500 tonnes of military hardware, including heavy tanks (like the M1 Abrams) or HIMARS launchers.
- Aviation: The stern includes a flight deck capable of supporting medium-sized helicopters, such as the NH-90 and SH-60 or various UAVs.

== Current operators ==
=== Nigeria (1+1 planned) ===
The Nigerian Navy was the LST 100 launch customer. The first vessel, NNS Kada, was built at Albwardy Damen in Sharjah and delivered in 2022. A second vessel was subsequently ordered.

== Future operators ==
=== Australia ===
In 2024, the Australian Government selected the LST 100 design for the Australian Defence Force’s Landing Craft Heavy (LCH) replacement program. Up to eight vessels are planned to be built domestically by Austal at the Henderson Shipyard. The first ship is planned to commence construction in 2026.

=== United States ===
In December 2025, the U.S. Navy selected LST 100 as the design basis for its Landing Ship Medium (LSM) program (formerly the Light Amphibious Warship). The U.S. plans to build up to 35 ships, designated as the McClung class, to support the Marine Littoral Regiments' Force Design 2030 concept in the Pacific. The U.S. government purchased the design rights for approximately US$3.3 million to allow for domestic production across multiple American shipyards.

== See also ==
- List of amphibious warfare ships
- List of LSTs
- Future of the Royal Australian Navy
- Future of the United States Navy
