= Megan McClung =

United States Marine Corps officer killed in combat (1972–2006)

Megan M. McClung
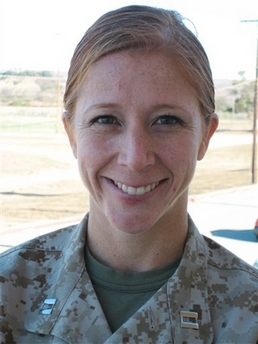
- Born: 14 April 1972; Honolulu, Hawaii, U.S.
- Died: 6 December 2006 (aged 34); Ramadi, Iraq
- Burial place: Arlington National Cemetery
- Alma mater: Admiral Farragut Academy; United States Naval Academy; Boston University
- Military career
- Allegiance: United States of America
- Branch: United States Marine Corps
- Service years: 1995–2006
- Rank: Major
- Unit: I Marine Expeditionary Force
- Conflicts: Iraq War †
- Awards: Bronze Star; Purple Heart; Hawaii Medal of Honor

Megan Malia Leilani McClung (14 April 1972 – 6 December 2006) was the first female United States Marine Corps officer killed in combat during the Iraq War, and the first female graduate of the U.S. Naval Academy to be killed in action. Major McClung was serving as a public affairs officer in Al Anbar Province, Iraq when she was killed.

== Biography ==
=== Early life ===
Megan Malia Leilani McClung was born on 14 April 1972, in Honolulu, Hawaii, to Mike and Re McClung. She was raised in Orange County, California, and graduated from Mission Viejo High School, Mission Viejo, CA in 1990. Megan became the first (or one of the first) female students to attend Admiral Farragut Academy in New Jersey, where she completed a one year course prior to entering the United States Naval Academy. She graduated from the Naval Academy and was commissioned in 1995.

Her family had a history of military service. Her paternal grandfather served in the United States Army during World War II, and her father was a U.S. Marine Corps infantry officer who served in Vietnam, seeing combat in the Tet Offensive. Her maternal grandfather was a U.S. Navy officer and pilot.

McClung graduated with her master's degree in Criminology from Boston University in 2006, several months prior to her death. Most of her coursework was completed while she was deployed.

=== Marine Corps career ===
McClung was commissioned as an officer in the Marine Corps in 1995 and served on active duty until 2004, when she entered the Reserves. In 2004, she joined Kellogg, Brown, and Root, an American engineering and construction company and went to Iraq as a private contractor.

In 2006, she returned to active duty with the Marines and in January 2006, she was deployed to Iraq as a public affairs officer with the I Marine Expeditionary Force (I MEF). She was promoted to the rank of Major in June. In December 2006, she was in the final month of a year-long deployment to Iraq and was the chief public affairs officer in Al Anbar Province, where she was in charge of embedded journalists. Earlier in the day on 6 December 2006, she had been accompanying Oliver North with his Fox News camera crew in Ramadi. She was escorting Newsweek journalists into downtown Ramadi when a massive improvised explosive device (IED) destroyed her Humvee, instantly killing McClung and the other two occupants, Army Capt. Travis Patriquin and Army Spec. Vincent Pomante III. The Newsweek journalists were not injured.

McClung was the first female Marine officer to be killed in the Iraq war, as well as the first female graduate of the U.S. Naval Academy to be killed in action.

Major Megan McClung was buried with full military honors in Arlington National Cemetery on 19 December 2006. Her headstone bears a phrase she coined while training military personnel on how to conduct interviews with the press: "Be Bold. Be Brief. Be Gone."

=== Athletic endeavors ===
While in high school and college, McClung competed as a gymnast. She was also a triathlete (having competed in six Ironman competitions) and a marathoner. In October 2006, she organized and ran in the Marine Corps Marathon's satellite competition, Marine Corps Marathon Forward in Iraq. In the weeks prior to her death, McClung was helping to prepare a satellite version of the Houston Marathon at Camp Fallujah.

== Posthumous honors ==
McClung was posthumously honored at Boston University's Metropolitan College 2007 commencement ceremonies with the 2006 "Excellence in Graduate Studies in Criminal Justice" award, which was accepted in her honor by her parents, Mike and Re. At that same ceremony, the school also established the Megan McClung Memorial Scholarship, which is awarded to graduate students in the Criminal Justice program based on academic standing and financial need.

The annual Major McClung Memorial Run at Naval Air Station Whidbey Island was established to raise money for wounded Marines and their families; its second run was held on August 23, 2008 . Her parents also present the Paul the Penguin Award at the annual Marine Corps Marathon held in Washington, D.C., to the final official finisher of the marathon. Before her death, McClung had been inspired by a blogger named John Bingham who loved to run but didn't want to participate in an official marathon as he was slow and would never win. In 2006, she had first presented the Penguin Award at the Marine Corps Forward Marathon in Iraq to credit the final runner who refused to quit and finished the race no matter their time. After her death, her parents were asked to continue giving the award at the 2007 Marine Corps Marathon and they have continued to do give it each year since.

Retired Marine Lt Gen Carol Mutter honored Major McClung for her sacrifice during a speech at the Republican National Convention on 4 September 2008.

In 2008, the first Major Megan M. McClung Memorial Scholarship was awarded to a college student by her parents, Drs. Re and Michael McClung, and the Women Marines Association. In 2014, the Major Megan McClung Memorial Scholarship Fund was first awarded at her alma mater, Admiral Farragut Academy. The award provides need-based financial aid to a deserving female cadet.

The Marine Corps issues the Major Megan McClung Leadership Award to an outstanding leader, role model and mentor each year at the Joint Women’s Leadership Symposium.

In 2007, Army General Ray Odierno was responsible for building a state of the art broadcast studio at Camp Victory, Iraq, which allowed live interviews as well as numerous press events. He dedicated the studio in honor of Major McClung.

The Defense Information School, the United States Department of Defense's training school for photojournalists and other public affairs personnel, presents the Maj. Megan McClung Leadership Award to one graduating member of each Public Affairs Qualification Course.

In November, 2024 Congress named the Mission Viejo Post Office in her honor. The facility is located at 28081 Marguerite Parkway in Mission Viejo, California and is now known as the Major Megan McClung Post Office Building. The designation was made by H.R. 3608 which was signed into law by President Joseph Biden on 25 November 2024.

Secretary of the Navy Carlos Del Toro announced 16 January 2025, USS McClung (LSM-1) as the name for the first ship in the new McClung-class landing ship medium.

== See also ==
- Barbara Dulinsky, first female Marine to serve in a combat zone
- Emily Perez, first female graduate of West Point to die in Iraq, and first black female officer in U.S. military history to die in combat.
