= Landing Ship, Tank =

Amphibious assault ship of World War II

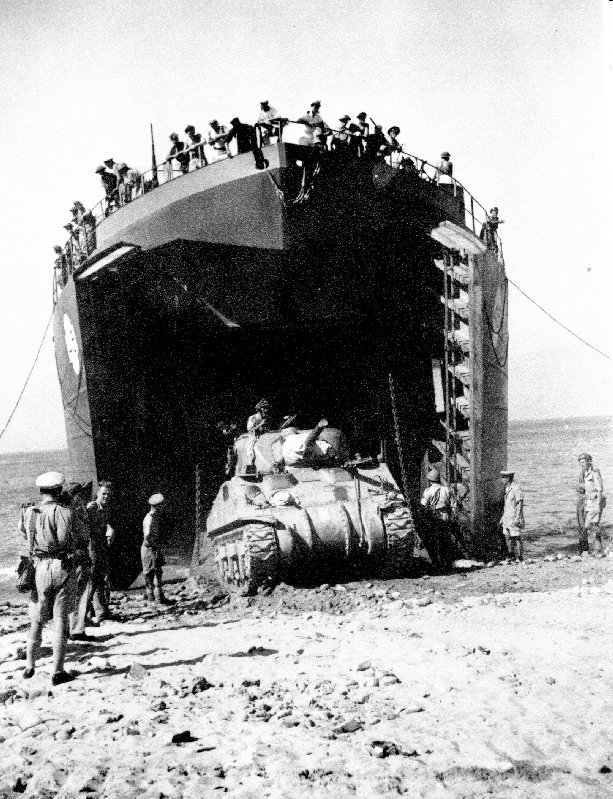
A Canadian LST off-loads an M4 Sherman during the Allied invasion of Sicily in 1943.

A Landing Ship, Tank (LST) is a type of amphibious warfare ship class designed to support amphibious operations by carrying tanks, along with other military vehicles and cargo, and landing troops directly onto a low-slope beach with no docks or piers. LSTs were first developed during World War Il and modern LSTs of different classes are now being built and used by several militaries. The shallow draft and bow doors and ramps enabled amphibious assaults on almost any beach. In peacetime, LSTs can serve in secondary missions such as humanitarian aid, disaster relief, medical assistance and transportation.

The LST had a highly specialized design that enabled ocean crossings as well as shore groundings. The bow had a large door that could open, deploy a ramp and unload vehicles. The LST had a flat keel that allowed the ship to be beached and stay upright. The twin propellers and rudders had protection from grounding. The LSTs served across the globe during World War II, including in the Pacific War and in the European theater.

In 1940, Rowland Baker, RCNC constructor, was tasked with developing a family of landing craft. He recognised the need for a 'mother' craft to carry smaller landing crafts across oceans. He developed the Landing Ship Dock concept. Baker was sent to the US with sketch designs. He worked with Captain Cochrane USN and BuShips to develop the Atlantic LCT design and fix all the basic parameters. Baker then worked with the US Maritime Commission, who brought the LST(2) to contract design. Winston Churchill arrived in Washington, and landing craft rose in priority. Orders were placed for LSTs and LSDs. Detailed design and construction of later craft was by Higgins of New Orleans.

The British ships were used in late 1942 during the Allied invasion of Algeria. In 1943, LSTs participated in the invasion of Sicily and mainland Italy. In June 1944 they were part of the huge invasion fleet for the Normandy landings.

Over 1,000 LSTs were laid down in the United States during World War II for use by the Allies; the United Kingdom and Canada produced eighty more.

== Design ==
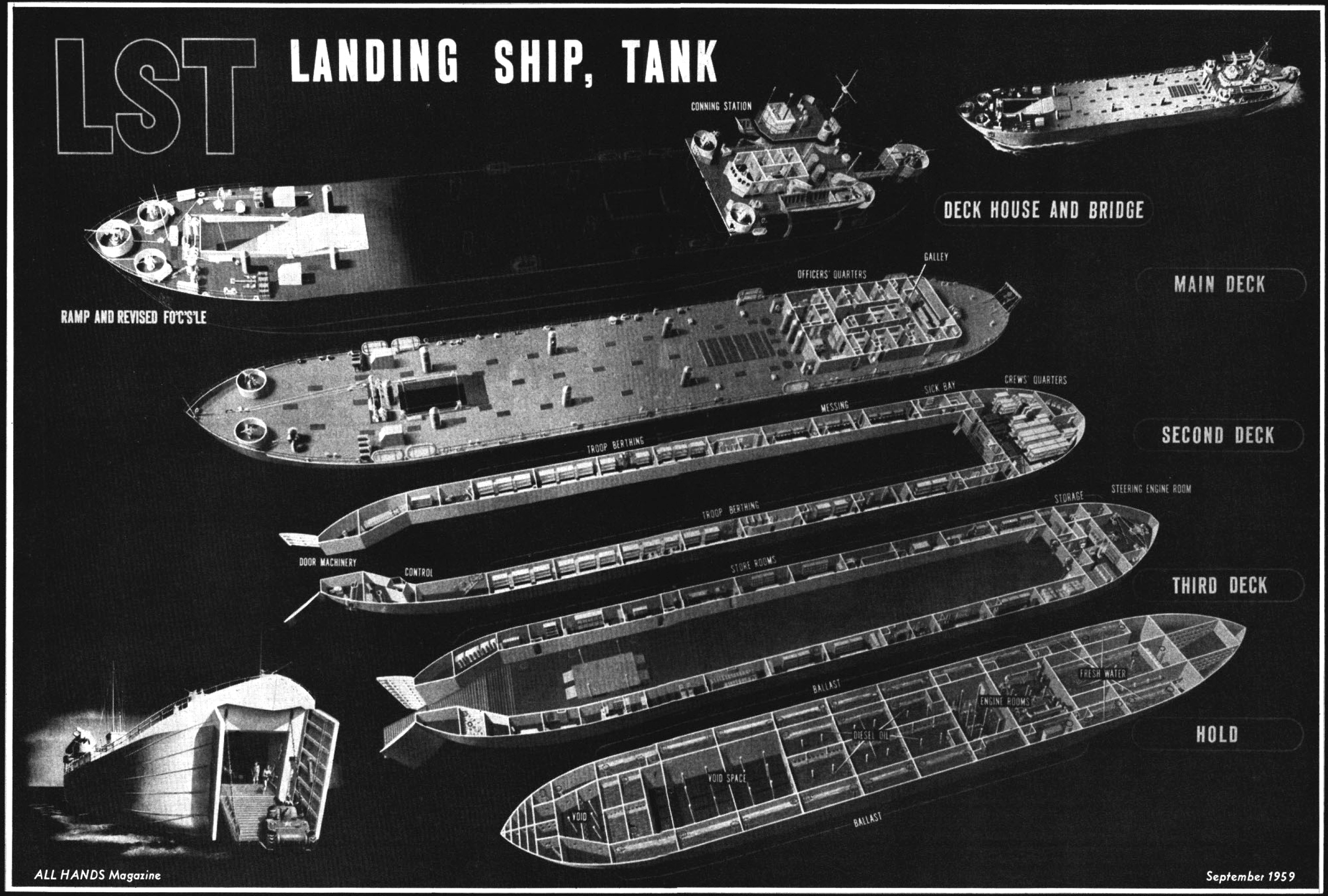
Technical drawing of a U.S. Navy World War II-tank landing ship

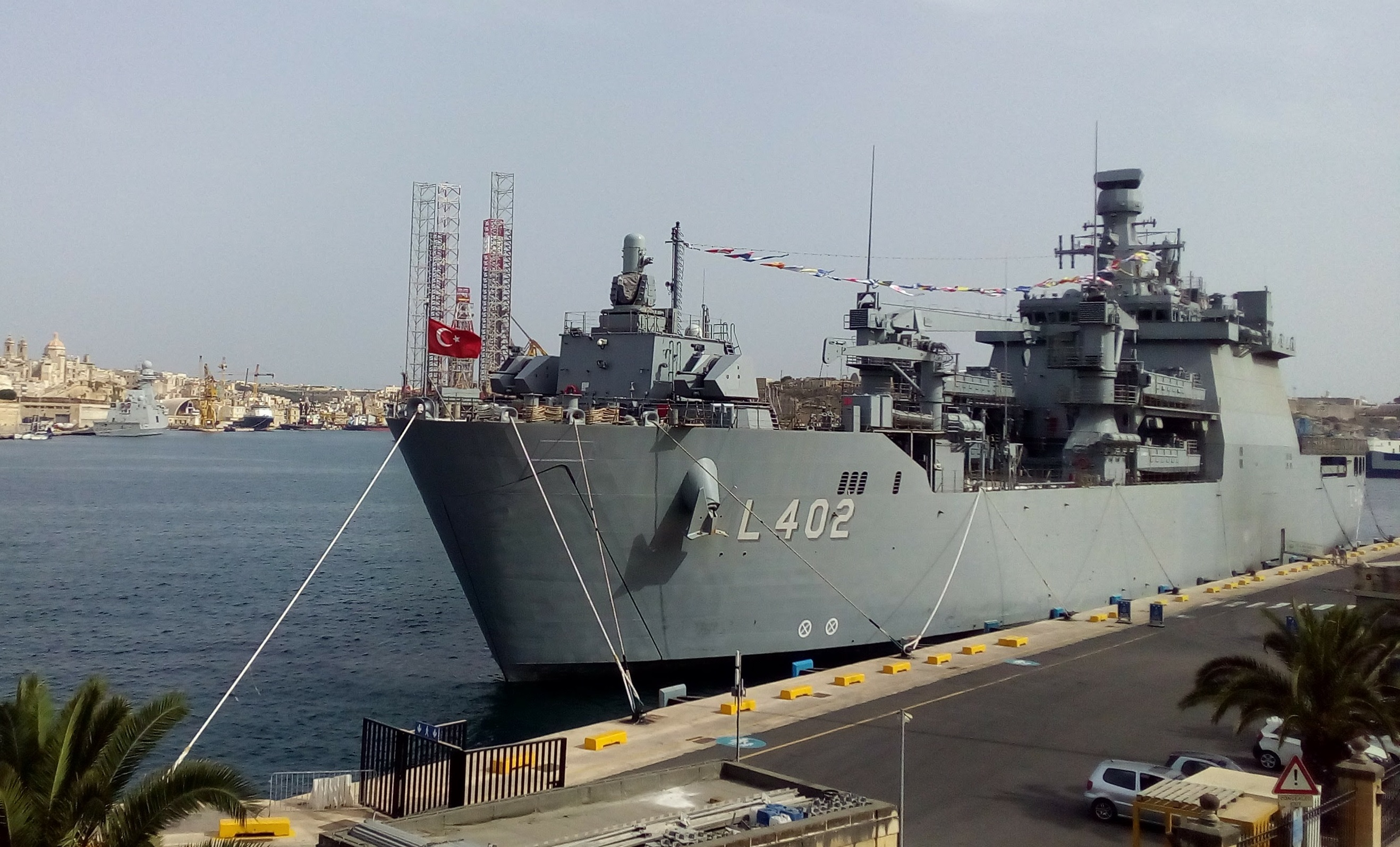
Turkish Bayraktar-class LSTs equipped with modern sensors such as SMART-S Mk2 radar and armaments such as CIWS and RCWS along with aviation facilities

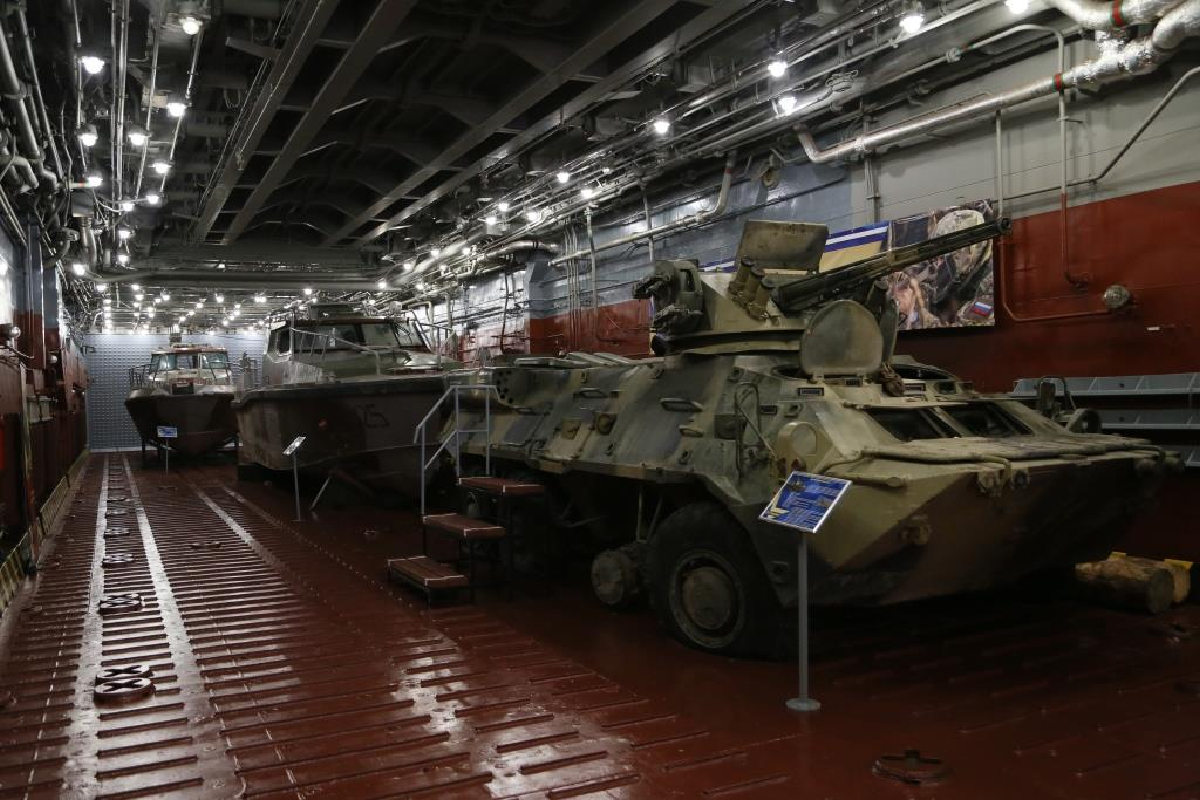
Inside of the Russian Ivan Gren-class LST

The fundamental design of the Landing Ship, Tank (LST) was born out of a contradictory set of operational requirements: the vessel needed to be highly seaworthy to cross oceans, yet possess a sufficiently shallow draft to deliver heavy armor and personnel directly onto unimproved beaches. To resolve this, early LST designers, notably John C. Niedermair of the United States Navy Bureau of Ships, developed a specialized ballast system. By flooding extensive ballast tanks, the ship could achieve a deep draft for stability during ocean transits; upon approaching a landing site, the water was rapidly pumped out, allowing the flat-bottomed hull to ride high in the water and safely run aground. Traditional LSTs of the Second World War era featured a distinctive blunt bow equipped with large clam-shell doors and a fold-down ramp. The internal architecture was centered around a continuous tank deck that ran the length of the vessel, reinforced to support the weight of heavy battle tanks and mechanized equipment. The ships were typically designed with a completely flat keel to prevent structural damage when resting on sand or gravel during tidal shifts. To extract themselves from the beach after offloading, LSTs utilized a stern anchor and winch system, which was dropped offshore prior to beaching to literally pull the vessel back into deep water.

Modern LST design evolved to incorporate greater speed, larger cargo capacities, and enhanced multi-role capabilities. Modern LSTs often integrate Roll-on/Roll-off (Ro-Ro) ferry concepts, allowing vehicles to be loaded and unloaded from both the bow and the stern, significantly increasing operational efficiency.

Some prominent examples of contemporary modern LST designs are the Turkish-built Bayraktar-class tank landing ship developed by the Anadolu Shipyard (ADIK) for the Turkish Naval Forces, the Chinese Type 072A developed for the People's Liberation Army Navy, and the Ivan Gren-class landing ship developed for the Russian Navy.

Unlike their World War II predecessors, the Bayraktar-class vessels (TCG Bayraktar and TCG Sancaktar) are designed with a monohull constructed of AH-36 high-tensile steel and incorporate modern stealth characteristics to reduce their radar cross-section. The Turkish LST design significantly expands on traditional amphibious assault capabilities. Measuring nearly 139 meters (456 ft) in length with a displacement of 7,254 tonnes, the Bayraktar-class features both an upper and lower Ro-Ro deck capable of carrying up to 1,200 tons of varied cargo, including main battle tanks, amphibious vehicles, and up to 350 fully equipped marines. Furthermore, modern LST designs like the Bayraktar integrate robust aviation facilities; the aft section of the Turkish ships features a reinforced flight deck rated for a 15-ton utility or attack helicopter, replacing the singular focus on beach landings with over-the-horizon aerial assault capabilities. Additionally, these vessels are designed to serve as command and control (C2) ships and hospital ships, featuring advanced combat management systems (GENESIS) and extensive medical facilities, reflecting the shift of LSTs from simple transport vessels to complex multi-mission platforms.

== History of service in World War II ==
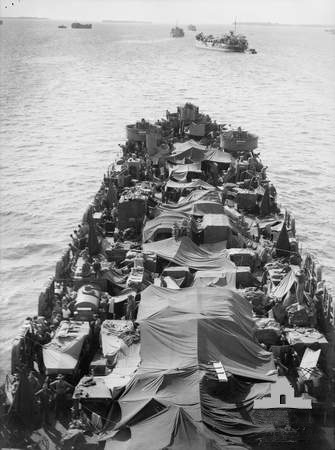
U.S. LSTs carrying the Australian 26th Brigade from Morotai Island to Tarakan Island in April 1945

From their operational début in Operation Ironclad in May 1942 until the end of the hostilities in August 1945, the LSTs performed a vital service in World War II. They participated in the invasions of Sicily (Operation Husky), Italy, Normandy, and southern France in the European Theater and were an essential element in the island-hopping campaigns in the Pacific that culminated in the liberation of the Philippines and the capture of Iwo Jima and Okinawa. At the Armor Training School in Ft. Knox, Kentucky, buildings were erected as exact mock-ups of an LST. Tank crews in training learned how to maneuver their vehicles onto, in and from an LST with these facilities. One of these buildings has been preserved at Ft. Knox for historic reasons and can still be seen.

Despite the large numbers produced, LSTs were a scarce commodity and Churchill describes the difficulty in retaining sufficient LSTs in the Mediterranean for amphibious work in Italy, and later the logistics of moving large numbers to the eastern theatres, while still supplying the large armies in Europe.

The LST proved to be a remarkably versatile ship. Thirty-nine of them were converted to become landing craft repair ships (ARL). In this design, the bow ramp and doors were removed, and the bow was sealed. Derricks, booms, and winches were added to haul damaged landing craft on board for repairs, and blacksmith, machine, and electrical workshops were provided on the main deck and tank deck.

Thirty-six LSTs were converted to serve as small hospital ships and designated LSTH. They supplemented the many standard LSTs, which removed casualties from the beach after landing tanks and vehicles. LSTs had brought 41,035 wounded men back across the English Channel from Normandy by D-Day+114 (28 September 1944). Other LSTs, provided with extra cranes and handling gear, were used exclusively for replenishing ammunition. They possessed a special advantage in this role, as their size permitted two or three LSTs to go simultaneously alongside an anchored battleship or cruiser to accomplish replenishment more rapidly than standard ammunition ships.

Three LST (2) were converted into British "Fighter Direction Tenders" (FDT), swapping their landing craft for Motor Launches and outfitted with AMES Type 11 and Type 15 fighter control radar to provide Ground-controlled interception (GCI) coverage for air defence of the D-Day landing areas. Of these ships, HMS FDT 216 was stationed off Omaha and Utah beaches, HMS FDT 217 was allocated Sword, Juno, and Gold beaches. HMS FDT 13 was used for coverage of the overall main shipping channel. In the period 6 June to 26 June Allied fighters controlled by the FDTs resulted in the destruction of 52 enemy aircraft by day, and 24 enemy aircraft by night.

=== LST flight decks ===
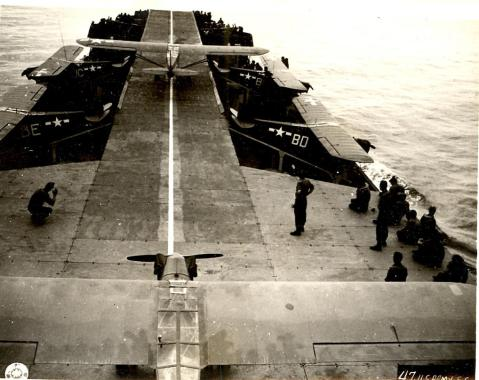
USS LST-906, with US Army Air Force L-4 Grasshopper on her flight deck being prepared for take-off. Note additional L-4 type aircraft stowed alongside the deck.

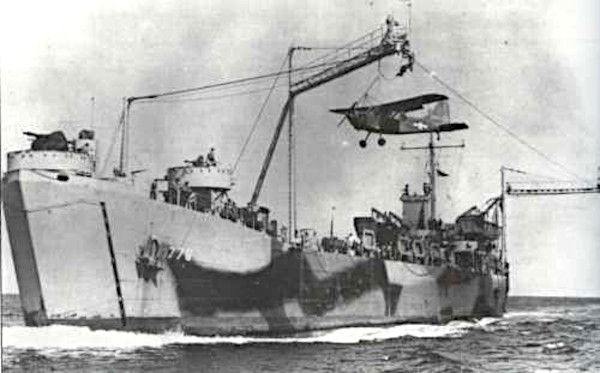
USS LST-776 with Brodie system front view during testing 1943

In the latter stages of World War II, some LSTs were fitted with flight decks that could launch small observation planes during amphibious operations. These were USS LST-16, USS LST-337, USS LST-386, USS LST-525, LST-776, and USS LST-906. Two others (USS LST-393 and USS LST-776) were fitted with the Brodie System for take off and landing.

It has been estimated that, in the combined fleets assembled for the war on Japan, the tonnage of landing ships, excluding landing craft, would have exceeded five million tons and nearly all built within four years.

Throughout the war, LSTs demonstrated a remarkable capacity to absorb punishment and survive. Despite the sobriquets "Large Slow Target" and "Large Stationary Target", which were applied to them by crew members, the LSTs suffered few losses in proportion to their number and the scope of their operations. Their brilliantly conceived structural arrangement provided unusual strength and buoyancy; HMS LST 3002 was struck and holed in a post-war collision with a Victory ship and survived. Although the LST was considered a valuable target by the enemy, only 26 were lost due to enemy action, and a mere 13 were the victims of weather, reef, or accident.

A total of 1,152 LSTs were contracted for in the great naval building program of World War II, but 101 were cancelled in the fall of 1942 because of shifting construction priorities. Of 1,051 actually constructed, 113 LSTs were transferred to Britain under the terms of Lend-Lease, and four more were turned over to the Greek Navy. Conversions to other ship types with different hull designations accounted for 116: 6 Miscellaneous Ships (AG), 14 Motor Torpedo Boat Tenders (AGP), 7 Self-Propelled Barracks Ships or “hotels" (APB), 13 Battle Damage Repair Ships (ARB), 39 Landing Craft Repair Ships (ARL), 3 Salvage Craft Tenders (ARST), 4 Aircraft Repair Ships (ARVA, ARVE), 1 Advance Aviation Base Ship (AVB), 4 Unclassified miscellaneous vessels (IX), and 36 LSTH. One LST which had been sunk in an accident was later raised and converted into a Covered Barge (YF).

== History of early post-war developments ==
=== United States ===
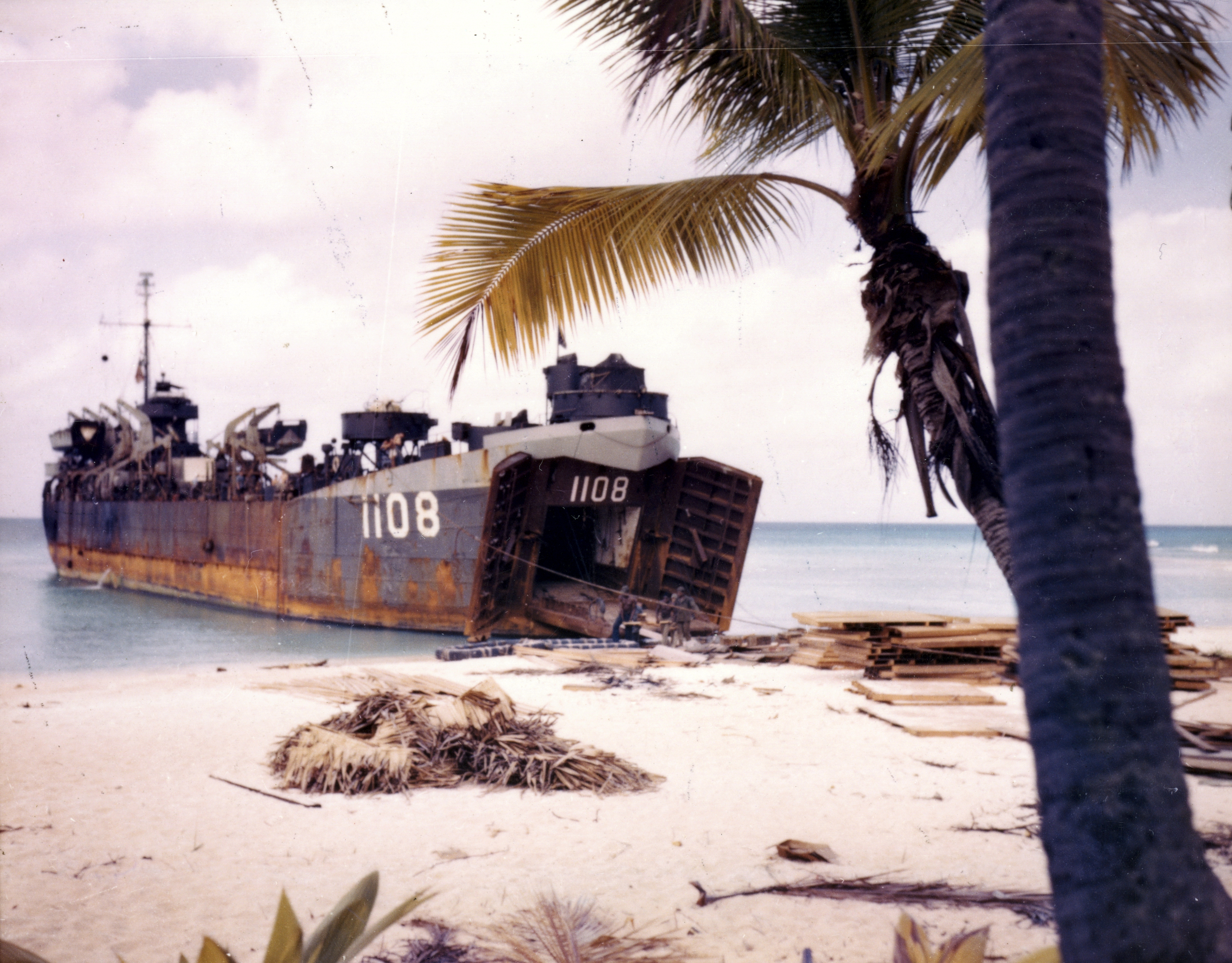
LST arrives at Rongerik Atoll in March 1946.

The end of World War II left the Navy with a huge inventory of amphibious ships. Hundreds of these were scrapped or sunk, and most of the remaining ships were put in "mothballs" to be preserved for the future. Additionally, many of the LSTs were demilitarized and sold to the private sector, along with thousands of other transport ships, contributing to a major downturn in shipbuilding in the United States following the war. Many LSTs were used as targets in aquatic nuclear testing after the war, being readily available and serving no apparent military applications. World War II era LSTs have become somewhat ubiquitous, and have found a number of novel commercial uses, including operating as small freighters, ferries, living quarters (Note: for example see MV Aminoil in Saudi Arabian–Kuwaiti neutral zone) and dredges. Consequently, construction of LSTs in the immediate post-war years was modest. LST-1153 and LST-1154, commissioned respectively in 1947 and 1949, were the only steam-driven LSTs ever built by the Navy. They provided improved berthing arrangements and a greater cargo capacity than their predecessors.

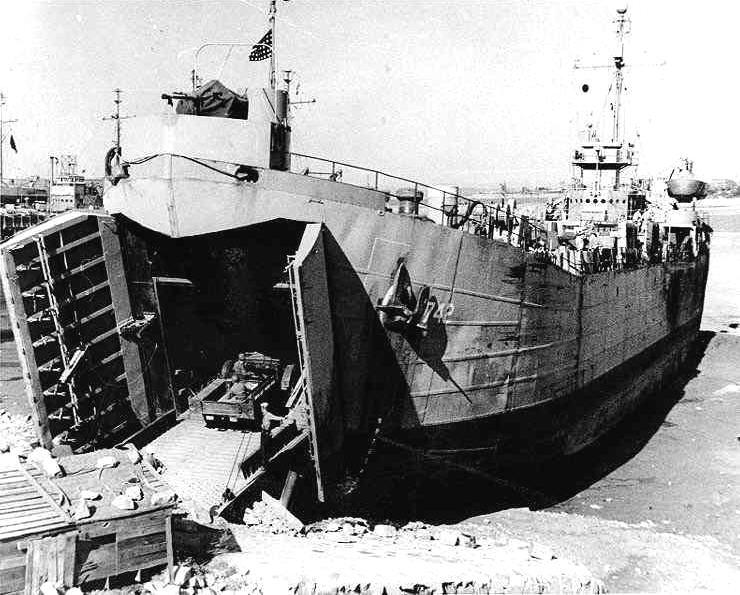
USS LST-742 on 13 October 1950 at Wolmi-do island, Incheon Harbor, South Korea, loading supplies for the upcoming Wonsan invasion

The success of the amphibious assault at Inchon during the Korean War showed the utility of LSTs once again. This was in contrast with the earlier opinion expressed by many military authorities that the advent of the atomic bomb had relegated amphibious landings to a thing of the past. During the Korean War a number of LSTs were converted to transport the much needed, but slow and short range LSU from the United States to the Korean theater of war using the piggy-back method. After arrival the LSU was slid off sideways from the LST. Additionally, LSTs were used for transport in the building of an Air Force base at Thule, Greenland during the Korean War. Fifteen LSTs of what were later to be known as the Terrebonne Parish class were constructed in the early 1950s. These new LSTs were 56 feet (17 m) longer and were equipped with four, rather than two, diesel engines, which increased their speed to 15 knots (28 km/h; 17 mph). Three-inch / 50-caliber twin mounts replaced the old twin 40 mm guns, and controllable pitch propellers improved the ship's backing power. On 1 July 1955, county or, in the case of Louisiana, parish names were assigned to many LSTs, which up to then had borne only a letter-number hull designation.

In the late 1950s, seven LSTs of the De Soto County class were constructed. These were an improved version over earlier LSTs, with a high degree of habitability for the crew and embarked troops. Considered the "ultimate" design attainable with the traditional LST bow door configuration, they were capable of 17.5 knots (32.4 km/h; 20.1 mph).

=== United Kingdom ===
==== Commercial ferry use ====
In 1946, a brand new concept of transport was developed in the UK. During World War II, the great potential of landing ships and craft was recognised; if it was possible to drive tanks, guns and lorries directly onto a beach, then theoretically the same landing craft could be used to carry out a similar operation in the civilian commercial market, providing there were reasonable port facilities. From this idea grew the worldwide roll-on/roll-off ferry industry. In the period between the world wars, Lt. Colonel Frank Bustard formed the Atlantic Steam Navigation Company, with a view to cheap transatlantic travel. This never materialised, but he observed trials on Brighton Sands of a LST in 1943 when its peacetime capabilities were obvious.

In the spring of 1946, the company approached the Admiralty with a request to purchase three of these vessels. The Admiralty was unwilling to sell, but after negotiations agreed to let the ASN have the use of three vessels on bareboat charter at a rate of £13 6s 8d per day. These vessels were LSTs 3519, 3534, and 3512. They were renamed Empire Baltic, Empire Cedric, and Empire Celtic, perpetuating the name of White Star Line ships in combination with the "Empire" ship naming of vessels in government service during the war.

The chartered vessels had to be adapted for their new role. First the accommodation on board had to be improved, and alterations in the engine and boiler rooms had also to be made. Modified funnels and navigational aids needed to be provided before they could enter service. On the morning of 11 September 1946, the first voyage of the Atlantic Steam Navigation Company took place when Empire Baltic sailed from Tilbury to Rotterdam with a full load of 64 vehicles for the Dutch government. On arrival at Waalhaven, the vessel beached using the method employed during wartime landings, being held by a stern anchor. The vessel stayed on the beach overnight, returning at 08:00 the next morning. This leisurely pace of work was followed for the first few voyages, the beach being employed possibly because normal port facilities were unavailable due to wartime damage. Following the initial Rotterdam voyage, ASN used their new vessels to transfer thousands of vehicles for the British Army from Tilbury to Hamburg, and later to Antwerp in 1955.

The original three LSTs were joined in 1948 by another vessel, LST 3041, renamed Empire Doric, after the ASN were able to convince commercial operators to support the new route between Preston Dock in Lancashire and the Northern Ireland port of Larne. Originally Liverpool was chosen, but opposition from other operators led to a move to Lancashire. However, special port facilities had to be constructed at both Preston and Larne before the new route could be opened – a wartime end-loading ramp built by engineers during World War II at Preston, and a floating pontoon from a Mulberry harbour connected via a bridge to the quay at Larne.

The first sailing of this new route was on 21 May 1948 by Empire Cedric. After the inaugural sailing, Empire Cedric continued on the Northern Ireland service, offering initially a twice-weekly service. Empire Cedric was the first vessel of the ASN fleet to hold a Passenger Certificate, and was allowed to carry fifty passengers. Thus Empire Cedric became the first vessel in the world to operate as a commercial/passenger roll-on/roll-off ferry, and the ASN became the first company to offer this type of service.

Some of the first cargo on this service were two lorry-loads of 65 gas cookers each on behalf of Moffats of Blackburn, believed to be the first commercial vehicles carried in this way as freight. The Preston–Larne service continued to expand, so much so that in 1950 it added a route to Belfast. This service opened in 1950, and sailings out of Preston were soon increased to six or seven a week to either Belfast or Larne.

In 1954, the British Transport Commission (BTC) took over the ASN under the Labour government's nationalization policy. In 1955, another two LSTs were chartered into the existing fleet, Empire Cymric and Empire Nordic, bringing the fleet strength to seven. The Hamburg service was terminated in 1955, and a new service was opened between Antwerp and Tilbury. The fleet of seven ships was to be split up, with the usual three ships based at Tilbury and the others maintaining the Preston to Northern Ireland service.

During late 1956, the entire fleet of ASN was taken over for use in the Mediterranean during the Suez Crisis, and the drive on/drive off services were not re-established until January 1957. At this point ASN were made responsible for the management of twelve Admiralty LST (3)s brought out of reserve as a result of the Suez Crisis, though too late to see service.

==== Army service ====
A major task at the end of World War II was the redistribution of stores and equipment worldwide. Due to the scarcity and expense of merchant shipping it was decided in 1946 that the Royal Army Service Corps civilian fleet should take over seven LSTs from the Royal Navy. These were named after distinguished corps officers: Evan Gibb, Charles Macleod, Maxwell Brander, Snowden Smith, Humfrey Gale, Reginald Kerr, and Fredrick Glover.

The LSTs needed to comply with Board of Trade regulations, and to be brought up to merchant navy standards, which involved lengthy alterations including extra accommodation. On completion, five vessels sailed for the Middle East, and two for the Far East.

During the evacuation of Mandatory Palestine, Humfrey Gale and Evan Gibb made fifteen voyages each between Haifa and Port Said lifting between them 26,000 tons of vehicles and stores.

Similar work was done worldwide until 1952 when the ships were handed over to the Atlantic Steam Navigation Company, and subsequently in 1961 to the British-India Steam Navigation Company, tasked by the War Office directly, RASC having no further concern with their administration.

==== Aviation training ====
The rapid increase in the use of helicopters in the Royal Navy in the late 1950s and 1960s required an increase in the training and support facilities ashore and afloat. Operational training for aircrew was carried out by naval air stations at Portland and Culdrose. The scrapping of some carriers and conversion of others to commando carriers in the mid-1950s left a shortage of suitable decks. This led to the ordering of RFA Engadine in 1964; however, she would not be available till 1967. In the meantime it was decided to convert LST 3027 to serve as an interim training ship.

This work was carried out at Devonport Dockyard in 1964. The deck forward of the cargo hatch was cleared of all obstructions, and strengthened for helicopter use. A small deckhouse used to support the gun emplacements was retained, although no guns were fitted, and it was used by the Flight Deck Officer as a helicopter control position. Below deck, two 10,000-imperial-gallon (45,000 L) aviation fuel tanks were installed at the fore end of the tank deck, and refuelling positions provided at the fore end of the flight deck. The tanks were sealed off by a bulkhead and the rest of the space used for stores, workshops and accommodation. Finally the bow doors were sealed, as they would no longer be needed. The flight deck was large enough for two Westland Wessex helicopters with rotors turning, or six could be parked with rotors folded. Renamed HMS Lofoten she proved extremely useful in service, and many lessons were learned that would be incorporated into Engadine.

=== Netherlands ===
After World War II, the Royal Netherlands Navy used three borrowed LST Mk.3s to transport soldiers and material in the Dutch East Indies.

== Modern developments ==
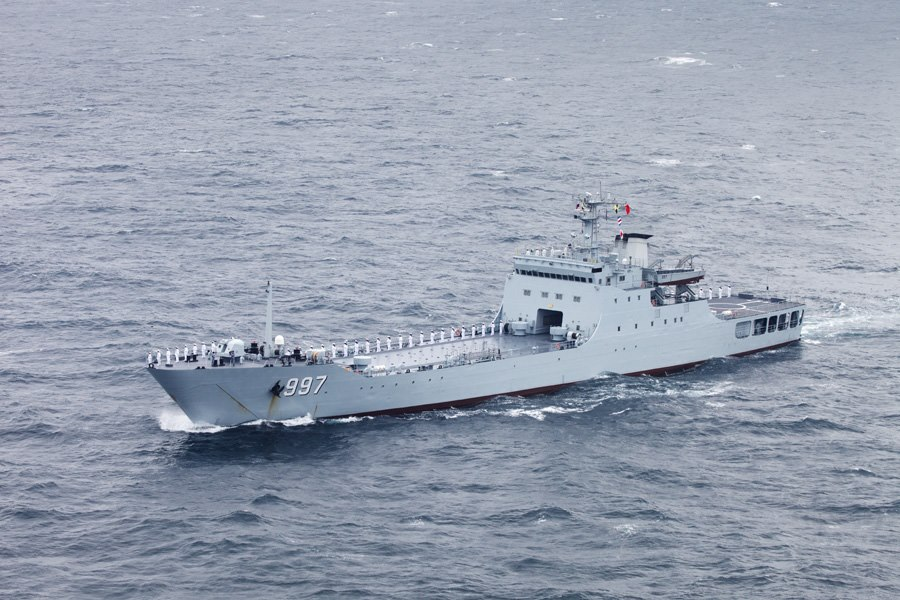
Chinese Type 072A LCT

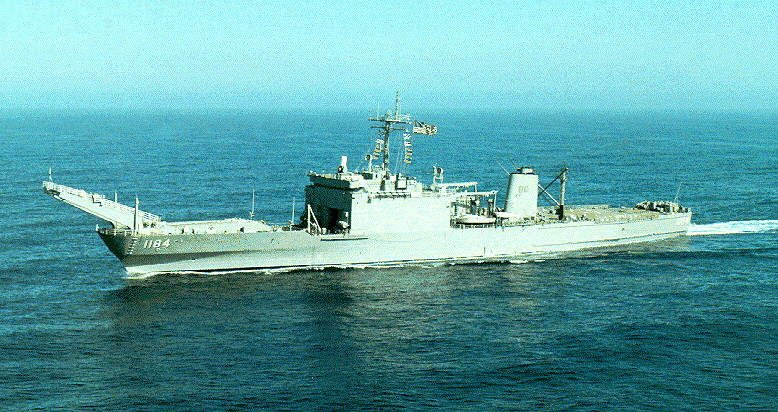
USS Frederick at sea. The Newport-class ships can debark amphibious vehicles from stern gates or the bow ramp.

The commissioning of the Newport class in 1969 marked the introduction of an entirely new concept in the design of LSTs. She was the first of a new class of 20 LSTs capable of steaming at a sustained speed of 20 knots (37 km/h). To obtain that speed, the traditional blunt bow doors of the LST were replaced by a pointed ship bow. Unloading is accomplished through the use of a 112-foot (34 m) ramp operated over the bow (similar in concept to the original HMS Boxer) and supported by twin derrick arms. A stern gate to the tank deck permits unloading of LVTs into the water or the unloading of other vehicles into a landing craft utility (LCU) or onto a pier. Capable of operating with high-speed amphibious squadrons consisting of LHAs, LPDs, and LSDs, the Newport-class LST can transport tanks, other heavy vehicles, and engineering equipment that cannot readily be landed by helicopters or landing craft. The Newport type were removed from U.S. Navy service in the 1990s, and Spanish Navy, Chile, Australia, and Malaysia but serves on in the navies of Brazil, Mexico, Morocco, Taiwan, in a modified form and soon with Peru.

Elsewhere, over 100 Polish Polnocny-class landing ships were produced from 1967 to 2002. The Indian Navy maintained a fleet of seven Polnocny-class LSTs and LCUs known collectively as the Kumbhir class till 2024.

=== Operators ===
- Algerian National Navy operates two Kalaat Beni Hammed-class tank landing ships.
- Azerbaijani Navy operates six Polnocny-class landing ships.
- Brazilian Navy operates one Round Table-class landing ship logistics, purchased from the United Kingdom.
- Chilean Navy operates two BATRAL-class landing ships, purchased from France.
- People's Liberation Army Navy operates, 12 Yuhai-class landing ships, 10 Yubei-class landing ships, 10 Yunshu-class landing ships, 1 Yudeng-class landing ship, 4 Yuting-class landing ships, 10 Yuting II-class landing ships, and 15 Yuting III-class landing ships.
- Republic of China Navy operates 2 Newport-class tank landing ships and 4 LST-542-class tank landing ships, all purchased from the United States.
- Israeli Navy operates two General Frank S. Besson-class support vessels, built in the US.
- Ivory Coast Navy operates a single BATRAL-class landing ship, purchased from France.
- Croatian Navy operates two Silba-class landing ship-minelayers.
- Ecuadorian Navy operates a single LST-542-class tank landing ship, purchased from the United States.
- Egyptian Navy operates three Polnocny-class landing ships.
- Navy of Equatorial Guinea operates one Salamandra-class landing ship.
- Hellenic Navy operates five Jason-class tank landing ships.
- Indian Navy operates one Magar-class amphibious warfare vessels, three Shardul-class tank landing ships.
- Indonesian Navy operates nine Teluk Bintuni-class tank landing ships, 11 Teluk Gilimanuk-class landing ships, four Teluk Semangka-class tank landing ships, and an post-war Japanese-built LST-542-class tank landing ship.
- Islamic Republic of Iran Navy operates four Hengam-class landing ships and four Karbala-class landing ships.
- (Iran) Islamic Revolutionary Guard Corps Navy operates three Hormuz 24-class landing ships and two Hormuz 21-class landing ships.
- Japan Maritime Self-Defense Force operates three Ōsumi-class tank landing ships.
- Kenya Navy operates two Galana-class landing ships.
- Republic of Korea Navy operates four Cheon Wang Bong-class tank landing ships and four Go Jun Bong-class tank landing ships.
- Libyan Navy operates one Polnocny-class landing ship.
- Royal Moroccan Navy operates three BATRAL-class landing ships, purchased from France.
- Nigerian Navy operates the NNS Kada
- Royal Navy of Oman operates the SNV Nasr al Bahr
- Peruvian Navy operates two Terrebonne Parish-class tank landing ships, purchased from the United States.
- Philippine Navy operates one LST-1-class tank landing ship, one LST-542-class tank landing ship, both purchased from the United States, and two Bacolod City-class support vessels.
- Polish Navy operates five Lublin-class minelayer-landing ships.
- Russian Navy operates 12 Ropucha-class landing ships, two Alligator-class landing ships, and two Ivan Gren-class landing ships.
- Syrian Navy operates three Polnocny-class landing ships.
- Royal Thai Navy operates two Sichang-class tank landing ships.
- Turkish Navy operates two Bayraktar-class tank landing ships and the TCG Osman Gazi
- Ukrainian Navy has a single Polnocny-class landing ship, may have been destroyed.
- United Arab Emirates Navy operates three Al-Quwaisat-class LSTs.
- United States Army operates eight General Frank S. Besson-class support vessels.
- Bolivarian Navy of Venezuela operates four Capana-class tank landing ships.
- Vietnam People's Navy operates three Polnocny-class landing ships and two LST-542-class tank landing ships, captured from South Vietnam.
- Yemeni Navy operates a single Polnocny-class landing ship.

=== Former operators ===
- Argentine Navy decommissioned its last LST, ARA Cabo San Antonio in 1997.
- Angolan Navy decommissioned its last Polnocny-class landing ship in 2004.
- Royal Australian Navy decommissioned its only Round Table-class landing ship logistics in 2013.
- Bulgarian Navy decommissioned its last Polnocny-class landing ship in 2017.
- Royal Canadian Navy decommissioned all its LST's following World War II.
- Cuban Revolutionary Navy decommissioned its only Polnocny-class landing ship in 1998.
- Ethiopian Navy decommissioned its last Polnocny-class landing ships, following the dissolution of its navy in 1993.
- French Navy decommissioned its last BATRAL-class landing ship in 2017.
- Gabonese Navy decommissioned its only BATRAL-class landing ship in 2016.
- Volksmarine decommissioned its 14 Frosch-class landing ship following German reunification.
- Iraqi Navy lost its two Polnocny-class landing ships during the Gulf War at the Battle of Bubiyan.
- Italian Navy decommissioned its last De Soto County-class tank landing ship in 1992.
- Royal Malaysian Navy lost its only Newport-class tank landing ship due to a fire in 2009.
- Royal Netherlands Navy loaned three LST Mk.3s from the Royal Navy after the Second World War, which were returned in 1947.
- Republic of Singapore Navy decommissioned its five LST-542-class tank landing ships in 1999.
- Somali Navy decommissioned its lone Polnocny-class landing ship in 1991, following the collapse of the government.
- Republic of Vietnam Navy transferred its four remaining LST-542-class tank landing ships to The Philippines in 1975.
- Spanish Navy decommissioned its last Newport-class tank landing ship in 2012.
- Royal Fleet Auxiliary decommissioned its last Round Table-class landing ship logistics in 2008.
- United States Navy decommissioned its last Newport-class tank landing ship in 2000.
- Yugoslav Navy two Silba-class landing ship-minelayers were captured by Croatia in 1992.

=== Future development ===
- Royal Australian Navy is building eight Damen LST 100s.
- Nigerian Navy is building an additional Damen LST 100.
- Russian Navy is building nine more Ivan Gren-class landing ships.
- United States Navy is building eight McClung-class landing ships.

== Notable incidents ==
=== World War II ===
- USS LST-342 was sunk 18 July 1943 by a torpedo from the Japanese submarine Ro-106 off the Solomon Islands. Artist McClelland Barclay was killed during the attack.
- During Exercise Tiger practice for an amphibious landing on 28 April 1944, German E-boats attacked a convoy in Lyme Bay. Two LSTs were sunk by torpedoes (LST-531 and USS LST-507) and two more were damaged, with 729 US army and navy personnel killed and missing.
- In the West Loch disaster on 21 May 1944, USS LST-353 exploded while moored in West Loch at Pearl Harbor, Hawaii. This caused explosions on other LSTs: LST-39, LST-43, LST-69, LST-179 and USS LST-480 sank, and others were damaged. The explosions killed 163 sailors and wounded 396.

=== Early Post-war ===
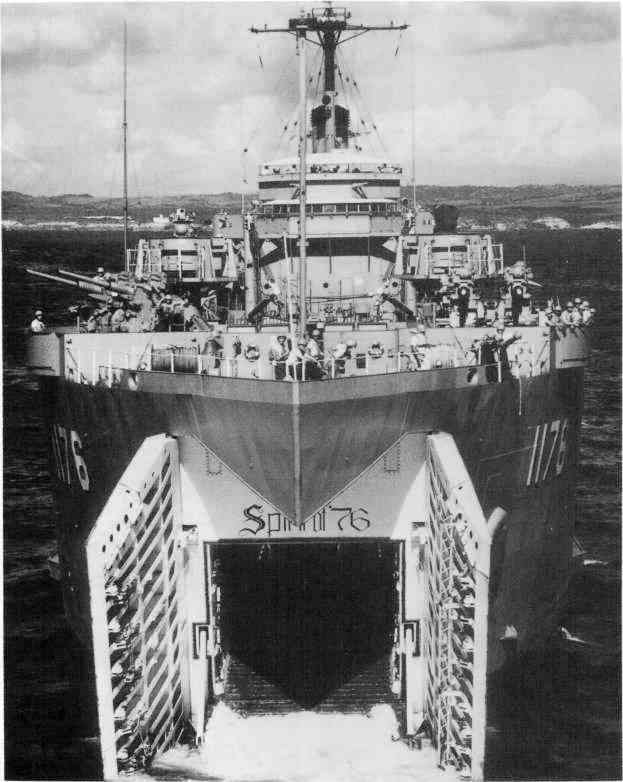
USS Graham County (LST-1176) beached at Vieques, Puerto Rico, in 1964

- USS LST-52 and LST-133 were used as targets in Operation Crossroads, the atomic bomb tests at Bikini Atoll in July 1946.

=== Modern era ===
- USS LST-467 was sunk in 1979 as an artificial reef near the U.S. Virgin Islands.
- USS Bulloch County (LST-509) – Vietnam People's Navy armed transport HQ-505 was sunk in 14 March 1988, during the Johnson South Reef Skirmish with China.
- Novocherkassk - Russia's large LST sunk by Ukrainian attack in 2023.

== World War II survivors ==
=== Indonesia ===
- KRI Teluk Ratai (509), ex-USS LST-678, is a museum ship in Pariaman, West Sumatra
- KRI Teluk Bone (511), ex-USS Iredell County (LST-839), was decommissioned by the Indonesian Navy on 15 August 2019

=== Philippines ===
The Philippine Navy received 20+ units of the LST Mk.2 starting in the late 1940s. This includes BRP Laguna (LT-501), ex-USS LST-230 and BRP Benguet (LT-507), ex-USS Daviess County (LST-692). The BRP Sierra Madre (LT-57), ex-USS Harnett County (LST-821) permanently beached on the Second Thomas Shoal. The ship serves as an advance outpost, and is currently at the center of a territorial dispute between China and the Philippines.

=== Singapore ===
RSS Resolution (L-204), ex-USS LST-649, is operated by the Republic of Singapore Navy as a training ship at Tuas Naval Base, Singapore. She was one of the five landing ships bought by Singapore on 5 December 1975 which consists of USS LST-836, USS LST-649, USS LST-629, USS LST-579 and USS LST-613.

=== South Korea ===
USS LST-849 was commissioned in 1945 and was an active ship until 2006. She served in the Okinawa campaign in May–June 1945 and earned one battle star for her service in World War II. She was transferred to the Republic of Korea Navy in 1958, commissioned as ROKS Wi Bong (LST-676), and served there until 2006. She was used to transport thousands of soldiers and their equipment from South Korea to South Vietnam during the Vietnam War. In 2007, she was decommissioned and sold to the city of Gunsan, South Korea for display in a maritime museum in a deal with the navy.

=== Taiwan ===
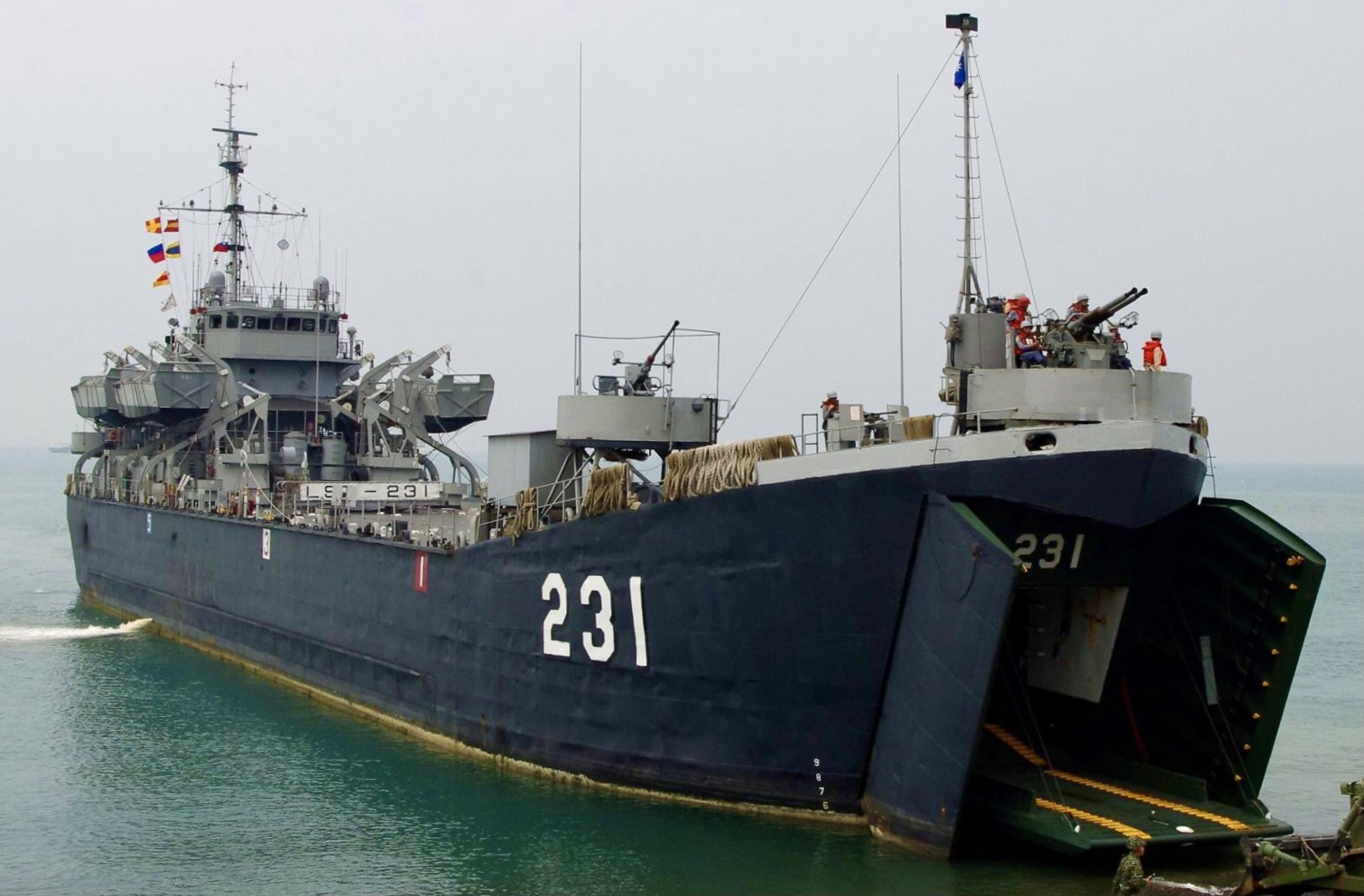
ROCS Chung Yeh (LST-231)

The Republic of China Navy currently operates 3 LST-542 Class vessels and 1 LST-1 Class Vessel. All 4 ships saw service during WW2.

- ROCS Chung Chien (LST-205), ex-USS LST-716, is active with the Republic of China Navy as of 2026
- ROCS Chung Chie (LST-218), ex-USS Berkeley County (LST-279), is active with the Republic of China Navy as of 2026
- ROCS Chung Ming (LST-227), ex-USS Sweetwater County (LST-1152), is active with the Republic of China Navy as of 2026
- ROCS Chung Yeh (LST-231), ex-USS Sublette County (LST-1144), is active with the Republic of China Navy as of 2026

=== Thailand ===
- HTMS Pangan (LST-713), ex-USS Stark County (LST-1134), is a museum ship in Surat Thani
- HTMS Lanta (LST-714), ex-USS Stone County (LST-1141), is a museum ship in Krabi

=== Vietnam ===
Tran Khanh Du (HQ-501), ex-USS Maricopa County (LST-938), had been transferred to the Republic of Vietnam Navy, and after the Fall of Saigon was captured by North Vietnamese forces. As of 2003, she is active and in commission with the Vietnamese People's Navy.

=== United States ===
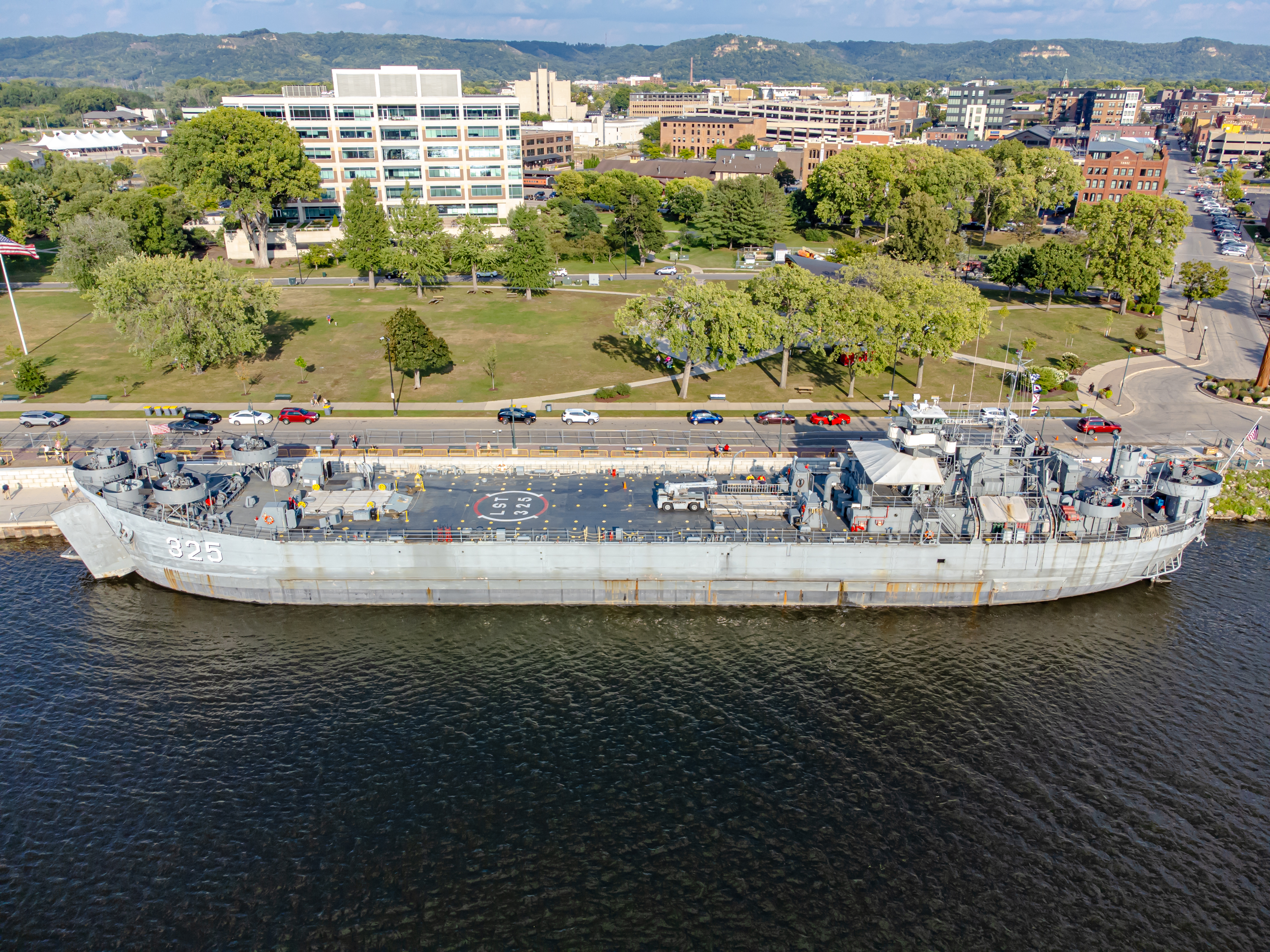
USS LST-325 as a mobile museum in La Crosse, Wisconsin

- USS LST-325, ex-RHS Syros (L-144), is a museum ship in Evansville, Indiana.
- USS LST-393 is a museum ship in Muskegon, Michigan.
- MV Cape Henlopen, ex-USS LST-510, was converted to a passenger and auto ferry and operates between New London, Connecticut, and Orient Point, on the East End of Long Island, New York.

== Cultural references ==
=== Literature ===
Lucky, a 2017 movie about an 90 year old atheist coming to terms with his own mortality. In one scene, Lucky encounters a fellow World War II veteran and reflects on his service in the US Navy during the Pacific campaign. He reveals that he earned his nickname thanks to his relatively safe position as a cook on an LST — a vessel humorously dubbed a "Large Slow Target" by the crew.

Jonah's Cathedral by R. D. Wall, is a novel of the Vietnam War based on the author's experiences while serving on an LST in the Mekong Delta in 1966. The book, #1 in the Jonah Wynchester Series, follows the exploits of U.S. Navy Gunner's Mate Jonah Wynchester from the time he reports aboard his new assignment, the LST USS Winchester County, at the Navy Amphibious Base in Little Creek, Virginia, on New Year's Day 1966 through the time the ship departs for Vietnam. The "Cathedral" refers to the nickname the crew have given the ship, a decrepit, run-down LST in the ready reserve fleet, that is suddenly re-activated and fully manned for the rapidly expanding need for LSTs in the Vietnam theater. Book #2, "Mekong Covenant" follows the ship across the Pacific into the deadly brown waters of the Mekong Delta.

The Ninety and Nine by William Brinkley, author of Don't Go Near the Water, portrays an LST running supplies to Anzio during World War II. The title refers to the ship's company of ninety enlisted men and nine officers. The book opens with a quotation attributed to Winston Churchill – "The destinies of two great empires ... seemed to be tied by some god-damned things called LST's."

In the biography Man In Motion: Michigan's Legendary Senate Majority Leader, Emil Lockwood by Stanley C. Fedewa and Marilyn H. Fedewa, Lockwood colorfully describes his World War II service aboard LST-478. "We were always in the thick of it," Emil said, "because it was our job on the LSTs to carry personnel-operated tanks, artillery, supplies—anything, you name it—into the heart of a war zone."

The novel Warm Bodies by Donald R. Morris portrays life on an LST in the 1950s. The title refers to the use of any available body in port during overhaul for any duty necessary. "A Warm Body is man with at least one arm and two fingers who can pick up something when he is told to." Although a work of fiction, the novel is based on Morris' experience as an officer aboard an LST.

== See also ==
- Altalena Affair – a decommissioned LST used to transport weapons to Israel was involved in a firefight between the Israel Defense Forces and a Jewish paramilitary group in June 1948
- Dyugon-class landing craft
- Landing craft tank
- List of amphibious warfare ships
- List of LSTs
- LSTH
- Rhino ferry
- West Loch Disaster
