= Type 073 landing ship =

Family of landing ships

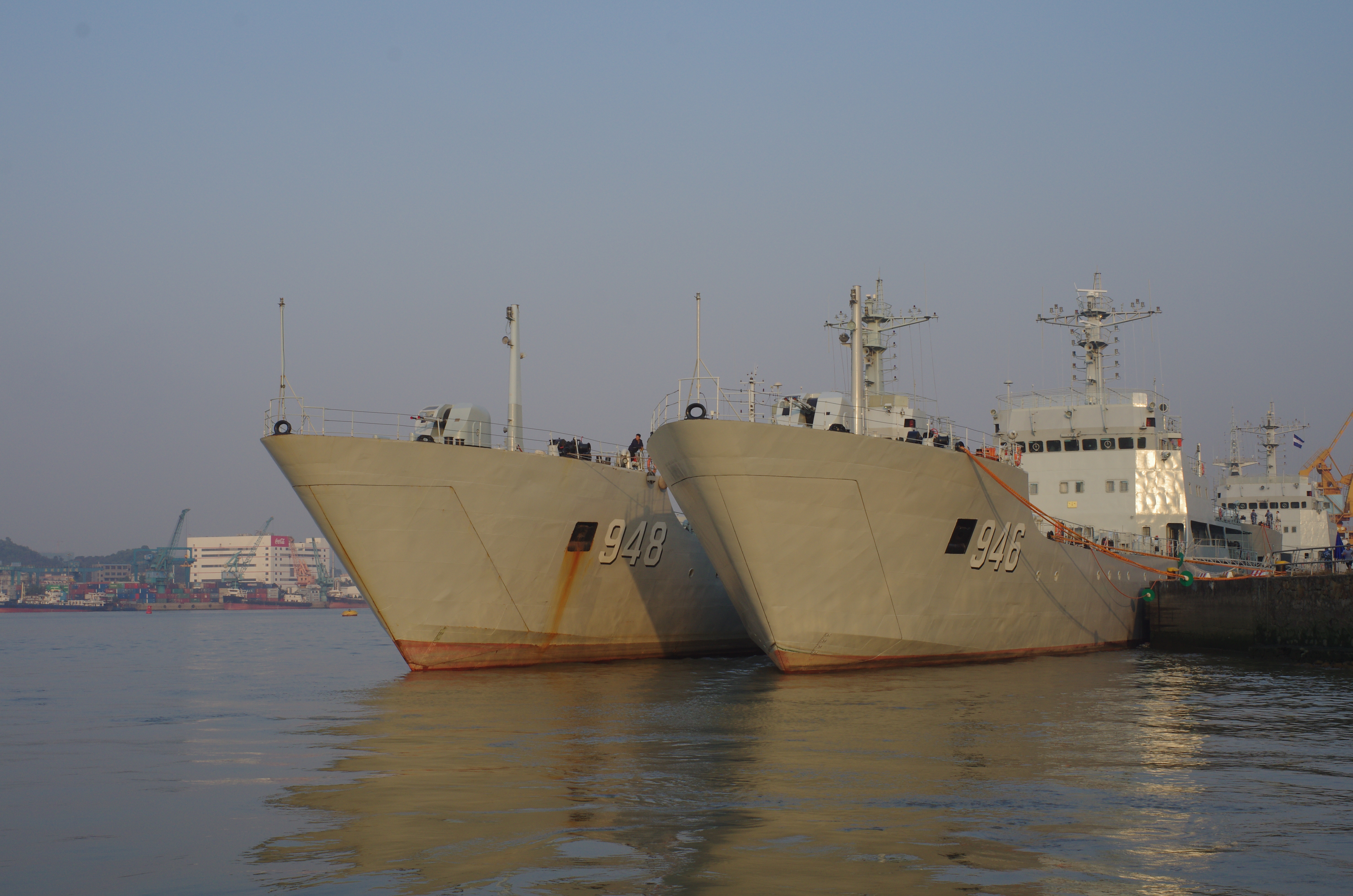
A Type 073A landing ship.

The Type 073 is a family of Chinese medium landing ships in service with the People's Liberation Army Navy.

== Type 073 ==
Class overview
- In commission: Early 1980s-2012
- Completed: 1+
- Retired: 1+

General characteristics
- Displacement: 1690 tons (standard)
- Length: 77.4 m (254 ft)
- Beam: 10.4 m (34 ft)
- Draft: 3 m (9.8 ft)
- Speed: 18 knots (33 km/h; 21 mph)
- Range: 1,000 nautical miles (1,900 km; 1,200 mi) at 16 knots (30 km/h; 18 mph)
- Complement: 60
- Sensors & processing systems: Fin Curve navigastion radar
- Armament: 2 x twin 25mm gun

The Type 073 (NATO reporting name: Yundao) were retired and may be in reserve as of 2024.

== Type 073III ==
Class overview
- Builders: Zhonghua Shipyard
- Built: c. 1991
- In commission: 1994-present
- Completed: 1
- Active: 1

General characteristics
- Displacement: 1460 tons (standard)
- Length: 87 m (285 ft)
- Beam: 12.6 m (41 ft)
- Draft: 2.3 m (7 ft 7 in)
- Propulsion: 2 × 6PA6I-280 diesel engines at 3,540 kW (4,750 hp) each; 2 shafts
- Speed: 17 knots (31 km/h; 20 mph)
- Capacity: 6 AAV, or; 180 troops, or; 250 tons cargo
- Complement: 74
- Sensors & processing systems: Type 760 radar; Type 753C radar
- Armament: 1 x twin 76mm PJ-76F gun

One Type 073III (NATO reporting name: Yudeng) was built. It was decommissioned in 2010. It was later converted and used as a supply ship for the South China Sea with two deck hatches and a crane.

== Type 073A ==
Class overview
- Builders: Hudong Zhonghua Shipyard; Lushun Shipyard; Qingdao Naval Dockyard; Wuhu Shipyard
- Built: c. 2003-2004
- In commission: 2003/2004-present
- Completed: 10
- Active: 10

General characteristics
- Displacement: 1550 tons (standard)
- Length: 87 m (285 ft)
- Beam: 12.6 m (41 ft)
- Draft: 2.5 m (8 ft 2 in)
- Propulsion: 2 × 6PA6I-280 diesel engines at 3,540 kW (4,750 hp) each; 2 shafts
- Speed: 17 knots (31 km/h; 20 mph)
- Capacity: 6 AAV, or; 180 troops, or; 250 tons cargo
- Complement: 74
- Sensors & processing systems: Type 760 radar; Type 753C radar
- Armament: 1 x twin 76mm PJ-76F gun

The Type 073A (NATO reporting name: Yunshu) (also called Type 074IV) is based on the Type 073III.

== See also ==
- List of active People's Liberation Army Navy ships

== Sources ==
- Erickson, Andrew S.; Kennedy, Conor M.; Martinson, Ryan D., eds. (November 2024). Chinese Amphibious Warfare: Prospects for a Cross-Strait Invasion. CMSI Studies in China Maritime Development. Vol. 8. Naval War College Press. ISBN 978-1-935352-86-0.
- Saunders, Stephan, ed. (2009). Jane's Fighting Ships 2009-2010. Jane's Information Group. ISBN 978-0-7106-2888-6.
- Saunders, Stephan, ed. (2015). Jane's Fighting Ships 2015-2016. Jane's Information Group. ISBN 978-0-7106-3143-5.
