= USS Tallahatchie County =

Tank landing ship of the US Navy

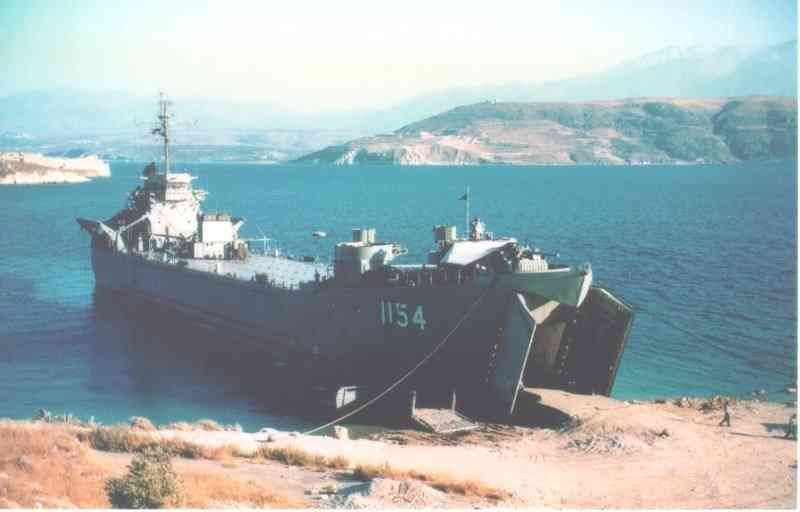
- USS Tallahatchie County (LST-1154) at Souda Bay, Crete in 1958.

History

United States
- Name: USS Tallahatchie County (LST-1154) & (AVB-2)
- Namesake: Tallahatchie County, Mississippi
- Builder: Boston Navy Yard
- Laid down: 4 August 1945
- Launched: 19 July 1946
- Commissioned: 24 May 1949
- Decommissioned: 15 June 1970
- Stricken: 15 June 1970
- Fate: Sold for scrapping

General characteristics
- Class & type: Talbot County-class tank landing ship
- Displacement: 6,000 long tons (6,096 t) (full)
- Length: 383 ft (117 m)
- Beam: 54 ft (16 m)
- Draft: 14 ft 5 in (4.39 m)
- Propulsion: two 450 psi Babcock & Wilcox boilers; two geared turbines; forward engine room: Westinghouse; after engine room: General Electric
- Speed: 14 knots (26 km/h; 16 mph)
- Boats & landing craft carried: Two LCVPs (LST)
- Troops: 197 officers and enlisted men (LST)
- Complement: 272 officers and enlisted men (LST); 190 officers and enlisted men (AVB)
- Armament: 2 × single 5"/38 caliber gun mounts; 2 × twin 40 mm gun mounts; 2 × 20 mm gun mounts

USS Tallahatchie County (LST-1154) was the second of only two Talbot County-class tank landing ships (LSTs) built for the United States Navy just after World War II. Named after Tallahatchie County, Mississippi, she was the only U.S. Navy vessel to bear the name.

== Construction ==
LST-1154 was laid down on 4 August 1945 at the Boston Navy Yard; launched on 19 July 1946; sponsored by Mrs. Wilder D. Baker; and commissioned on 24 May 1949. She recommissioned as an AVB in 1962.

== History ==
From her commissioning until 1962, LST-1154 alternated assignments for the Amphibious Force, Atlantic Fleet along the east coast of the United States with assignment to the 6th Fleet during periodic deployments to the Mediterranean. She was redesignated USS Tallahatchie County (LST-1154) on 1 July 1955. She was decommissioned at Charleston (SC) Naval Shipyard in 1960 in preparation for conversion to AVB-2.

On 3 February 1962 her conversion was completed to an Advance Aviation Base Ship (one of two ships of the steam-powered LST-1153-class) and redesignated USS Tallahatchie County (AVB-2.) Her aft superstructure was extended forward and her forecastle built up; electronic antennas and a heavy king post were mounted amidships. As an AVB, Tallahatchie County was designed to provide command and logistic facilities to a squadron of P-2 Neptune antisubmarine patrol planes operating from an improvised land base in Souda Bay, Crete. Squadron equipment was carried in mobile vans, transported in Tallahatchie County's tank deck, and landed over her bow ramp.

For the remainder of her career, Tallahatchie County provided support to aviation units in the Mediterranean. She was decommissioned on 3 January 1970 and struck from the Naval Vessel Register on 15 July 1970. Tallahatchie County was sold for scrapping to Contieri Navali Santa Maria of Genoa, Italy in July 1970.

== See also ==
- USS Talbot County (LST-1153)
- List of United States Navy LSTs

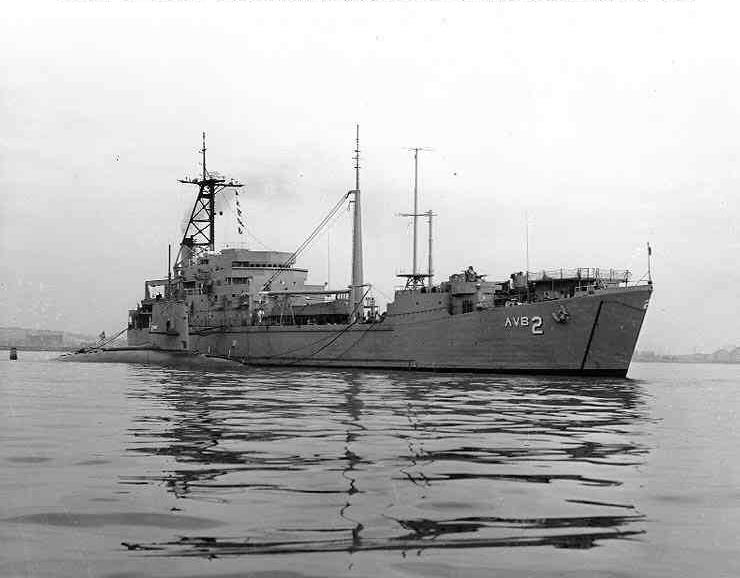
USS Tallahatchie County (AVB-2) with the USS Scorpion (SSN-589) alongside, outside Claywall Harbor, Naples, Italy in April 1968, shortly before Scorpion departed on her last voyage. This is believed to be one of the last photographs taken of Scorpion.
