= McClung-class landing ship medium =

Landing Ship Tank (LST) design by Damen Group

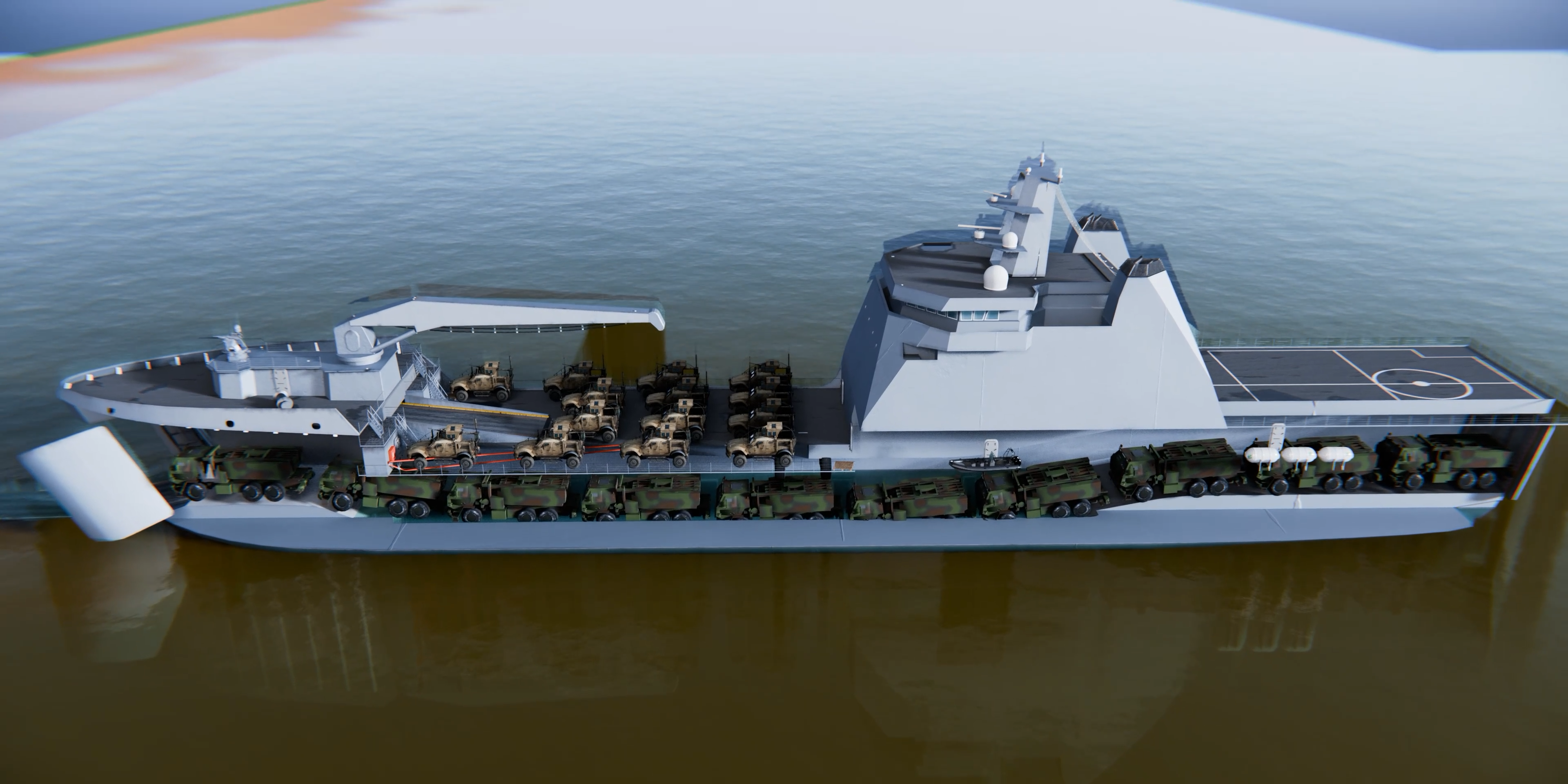
- Concept art of the McClung-class landing ship medium

Class overview
- Name: McClung class
- Builders: Bollinger Shipyards, Mississippi; Fincantieri Marinette Marine, Wisconsin
- Operators: United States Navy
- Planned: 18 (up to 35)

General characteristics
- Type: Landing Ship Medium
- Displacement: 4,000 t (3,900 long tons)
- Length: 100 m (328 ft 1 in)
- Beam: 16 m (52 ft 6 in)
- Draught: 3.5 m (11 ft 6 in)
- Installed power: 4 x Caterpillar C-18 diesel generators (baseline design)
- Propulsion: 2 x Caterpillar 3516C main engines
- Speed: 15 knots (28 km/h; 17 mph) (maximum)
- Range: 3,400 nautical miles (6,300 km; 3,900 mi)
- Capacity: 500 tonnes cargo
- Troops: 250-282 troops
- Crew: 18-32
- Armament: 1× 30 mm gun (planned)
- Aviation facilities: Flight deck

The McClung class is a planned class of Landing Ship Medium (LSM) currently under development for the United States Navy. Formerly known as the Light Amphibious Warship (LAW) program, the class is designed to support the United States Marine Corps' Force Design 2030 concept. Secretary of the Navy Carlos Del Toro announced in January 2025 that the class would be named after Major Megan McClung, the first female Marine Corps officer killed in combat during the Iraq War.

== Design and development ==
The program originated as the Light Amphibious Warship (LAW) in 2020. After initial industry bids for a custom design were deemed too expensive (exceeding $350 million per hull), the U.S. Navy pivoted in 2024 to a non-developmental commercial design to lower costs and speed up production.

In December 2025, NAVSEA officially selected the Dutch shipbuilder Damen’s LST 100 as the technical basis for the class, purchasing the data package for approximately $3.3 million.

On February 17 2026, NAVSEA put out a request for proposal for a Vessel Construction Manager (VCM). The VCM will manage the construction of the vessels and contracts with shipyards and suppliers.

== Ships in class ==
The Navy plans to build 18 to 35 ships of this class. To maximize the domestic industrial base, the Navy is using a Vessel Construction Manager (VCM) model, where a commercial entity manages the design and coordinates construction across multiple U.S. shipyards.

Hull number	Name	Builder	Laid down	Launched	Commissioned	Status	Notes
LSM-1	McClung	Bollinger Shipyards				Ordered	
LSM-2 - 5	TBD	Fincantieri Marine Group				Ordered	
LSM-6-9	TBD	Hanwha Philly Shipyard				Ordered	
LSM-10-36	TBD	TBD				Planned / Authorized	

== See also ==
- List of amphibious warfare ships
- List of LSTs

Equivalent landing ships of the same era

- Type 072A (Batch 2)
- Isla Tiburón class
- Teluk Bintuni class
- Ivan Gren class
