= LST Mk.2 =

Tank landing ship class

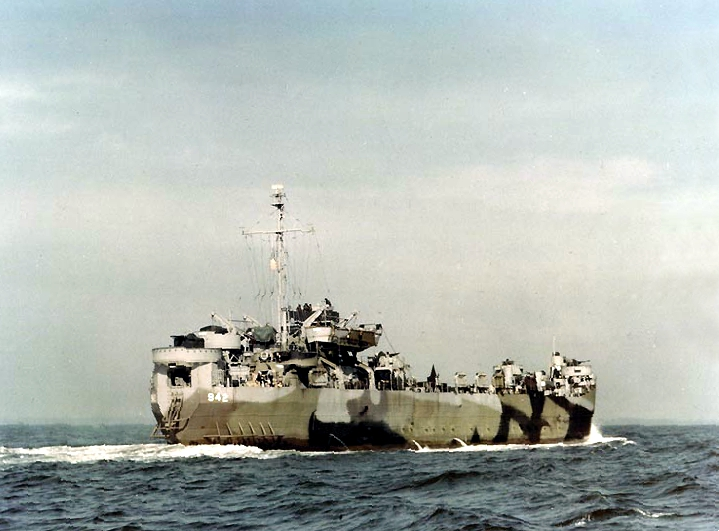
- LST-942 underway soon after completion, late in 1944

Class overview
- Name: LST (2)
- Builders: Dravo Corporation; Kaiser Shipyards; Jeffersonville Boat & Machine Co.; Missouri Valley Bridge & Iron Co.; Chicago Bridge & Iron Co.; American Bridge Co.; Bethlehem Hingham Shipyard; Boston Navy Yard; Newport News Shipbuilding
- Operators: United States Navy; United States Coast Guard; Royal Navy; Royal Canadian Navy; Japan Maritime Self-Defense Force; Republic of Singapore Navy; Philippine Navy; Royal Malaysian Navy; Republic of China Navy; People's Liberation Army Navy; Royal Thai Navy; Vietnam People's Navy; Hellenic Navy; German Navy; Argentine Navy; Peruvian Navy; Turkish Naval Forces; Indonesian Navy; Republic of Korea Navy; Bolivarian Navy of Venezuela; Mexican Navy; Italian Navy
- Succeeded by: Talbot County class
- Subclasses: LST-1 class; LST-491 class; LST-542 class
- Built: 1942–1945
- In commission: 1942–1971 (US)
- Completed: 1052
- Canceled: 100
- Active: 1 (Singapore); 4 (Taiwan); 2 (Vietnam); 3 (Philippines)
- Preserved: USS LST-325; USS LST-393; USS LST-510; ROKS Hwa San; ROKS Un Bong; ROKS Wi Bong; HTMS Pangan; HTMS Lanta

General characteristics
- Displacement: 1,780 long tons (1,809 t) light; 3,880 long tons (3,942 t) full load
- Length: 327 ft 9 in (99.90 m)
- Beam: 50 ft (15 m)
- Draught: Unloaded: 3 ft 4 in (1.02 m) bow; 7 ft 6 in (2.29 m) stern; Loaded : 8 ft 2 in (2.49 m) bow; 14 ft 1 in (4.29 m) stern
- Propulsion: 2 × General Motors 12-567 diesel engines, two shafts, twin rudders
- Speed: 12 knots (14 mph; 22 km/h)
- Boats & landing craft carried: 2 to 6 LCVPs
- Troops: About 140 officers and other ranks
- Complement: 8 to 10 officers, 100 to 115 enlisted
- Armament: 1 × 3 in (76 mm) gun; 6 × 40 mm Bofors guns; 6 × 20 mm guns; 2 × .50 cal (12.7 mm) machine guns; 4 × .30 cal (7.62 mm) machine guns

The LST Mk.2 was a class of tank landing ship developed for the British and United States navies during World War II.

== Development ==
At their first meeting at the Atlantic Conference in Argentia, Newfoundland, in August 1941, US President Franklin D. Roosevelt and British Prime Minister Winston Churchill confirmed the Admiralty's views. In November 1941, a small delegation from the Admiralty arrived in the United States to pool ideas with the United States Navy's Bureau of Ships with regard to development of ships and the possibility of building further Boxers in the US. During this meeting, it was decided that the Bureau of Ships would design these vessels. As with the standing agreement, these ships would be built by the US so British shipyards could concentrate on building vessels for the Royal Navy. The specifications called for vessels capable of crossing the Atlantic, and the original title given to them was "Atlantic Tank Landing Craft", abbreviated as "Atlantic (T.L.C.)". Calling a vessel 300 ft (91 m) long a "craft" was considered a misnomer and the type was renamed "Landing Ship, Tank (2)", or "LST (2)".

The LST (2) design incorporated elements of the first British LCTs from their designer, Sir Rowland Baker, who was part of the British delegation. One of the elements provided for sufficient buoyancy in the ships' sidewalls so that they would float the ship even when the tank deck was flooded. The LST (2) gave up the speed of HMS Boxer, at only 10 knots (19 km/h; 12 mph), but carried a similar load while drawing only three feet (91 cm) forward when beaching.

== Design ==
Within a few days, John C. Niedermair of the Bureau of Ships sketched out an awkward looking ship that proved to be the basic design for the more than 1,000 LST (2) that were built during World War II. To meet the conflicting requirements of deep draft for ocean travel and shallow draft for beaching, the ship was designed with a large ballast system that could be filled for ocean passage and pumped out for beaching operations. An anchor and mechanical winch system also aided in the ship's ability to pull itself off the beach. The rough sketch was sent to Britain on 5 November 1941 and accepted immediately. The Admiralty then requested that the United States build 200 "LST (2)" for the Royal Navy under the terms of lend-lease.

The preliminary plans initially called for an LST 280 feet (85 m) in length; but, in January 1942, the Bureau of Ships discarded these drawings for a slightly longer ship of 290 feet (88 m). Within a month, final working plans were developed that further stretched the overall length to 328 feet (100 m) with a 50-foot (15 m) beam and a minimum draft of 3.8 feet (1.2 m). This scheme distributed the ship's weight over a greater area, enabling her to ride higher in the water when in landing trim. The LST could carry a 2,100 short tons (1,900 t) load of tanks and vehicles. The larger dimensions also permitted the designers to increase the width of the bow door opening and ramp from 12 to 14 feet (3.7 to 4.3 m) in order for it to be able to accommodate most Allied vehicles. As the dimensions and weight of the LST increased, steel plating thickness increased from 1/4-inch (6.4 mm) to 3/8-inch (9.5 mm) on the deck and sides, with 1-inch-thick (25 mm) plating under the bow. By January 1942, the first scale model of the LST had been built and was undergoing tests at the David Taylor Model Basin in Washington, D.C.

Provisions were made for the satisfactory ventilation of the tank space while the tank motors were running, and an elevator was provided to lower vehicles from the main deck to the tank deck for disembarking. In April 1942 a mock-up of the well-deck of an LST was constructed at Fort Knox, Kentucky, to resolve the problem of ventilation within the LST well-deck. The interior of the building was constructed to duplicate all the features found within an actual LST. Being the home to the Armored Force Board, Fort Knox supplied tanks to run on the inside while Naval architects developed a ventilation system capable of evacuating the well-deck of harmful gases. Testing was completed in three months. This historic building remains at Fort Knox today.

Early LST operations required overcoming the 18th-century language of the Articles for the Government of the United States Navy: "He who doth suffer his ships to founder on rocks and shoals shall be punished..." There were some tense moments of concept testing at Quonset, Rhode Island, in early 1943 when designer Niedermair encouraged the commanding officer of the first U.S. LST to drive his ship onto the beach at full speed of 10 knots (12 mph; 19 km/h).

== Production ==
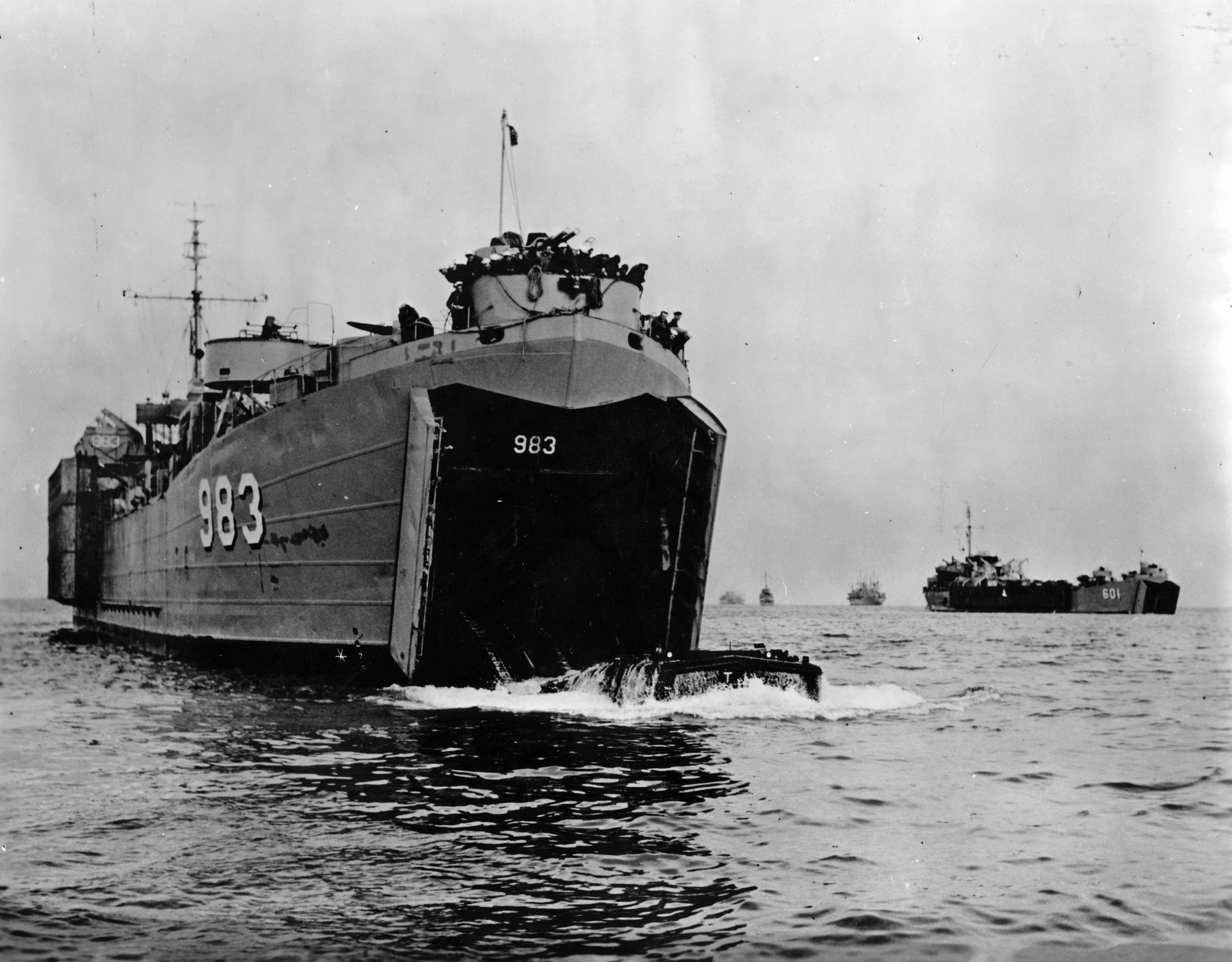
USS LST-983 (USS Middlesex County) with LST-601 (USS Clarke County) in the background, launches a Marine LVTP-5 for a waterborne landing, in the 1960s. When carrying amphibious tractors, an LST could land her payload from offshore without beaching.

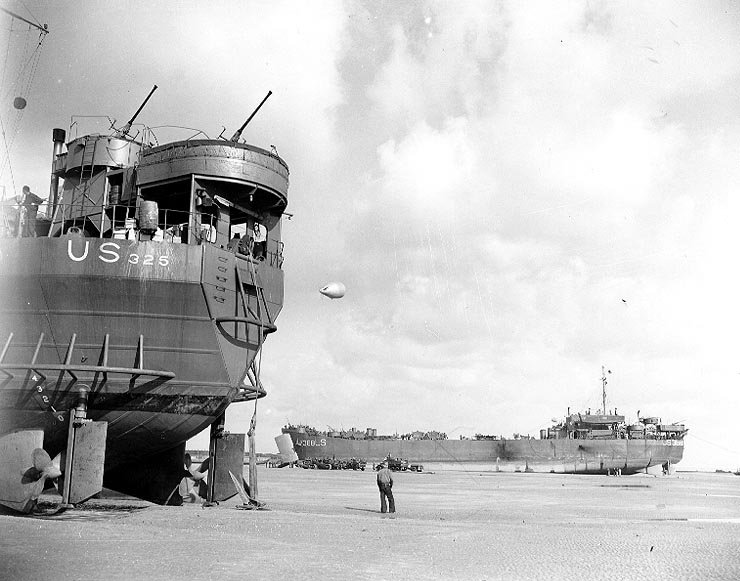
USS LST-325 (left) and USS LST-388 unloading at low tide while beached during the Normandy Invasion in June 1944

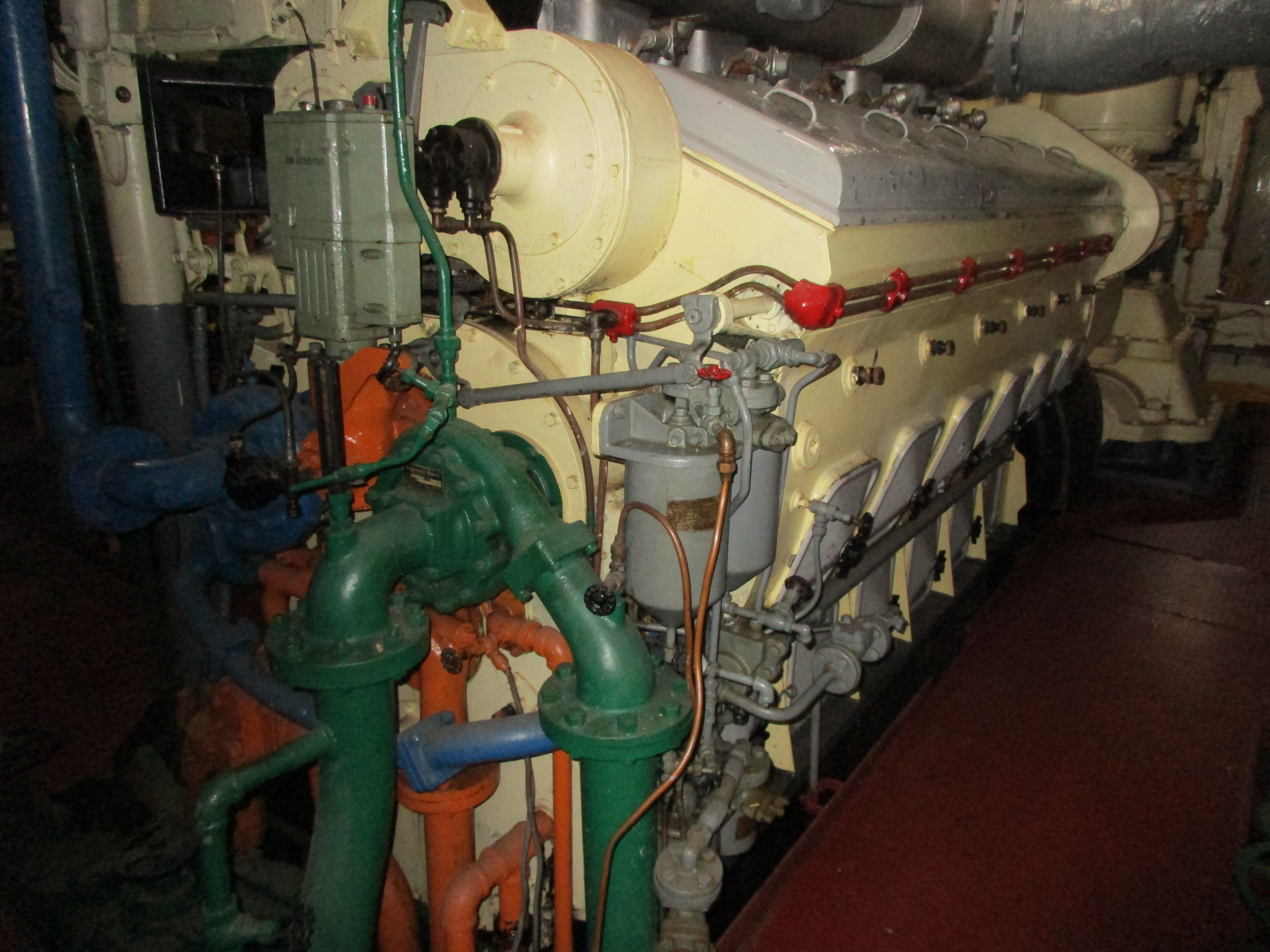
A GM EMD 12-567ATLP diesel engine as installed in USS LST-393. The engines were rated at 900 HP (each) at 744 RPM.

The LST(2) was built as the LST-1 class and the LST-491 class.

In three separate acts dated 6 February 1942, 26 May 1943, and 17 December 1943, Congress provided the authority for the construction of LSTs along with a host of other auxiliaries, destroyer escorts, and assorted landing craft. The enormous building program quickly gathered momentum. Such a high priority was assigned to the construction of LSTs that the previously laid keel of an aircraft carrier was hastily removed to make room for several LSTs to be built in her place. The keel of the first LST was laid down on 10 June 1942 at Newport News, Virginia, and the first standardized LSTs were floated out of their building dock in October. Twenty-three were in commission by the end of 1942.

The LST building program was unique in several respects. As soon as the basic design had been developed, contracts were let and construction was commenced in quantity before the completion of a test vessel. Preliminary orders were rushed out verbally or by telegrams, telephone, and air mail letters. The ordering of certain materials actually preceded the completion of design work. While many heavy equipment items, such as main propulsion machinery, were furnished directly by the Navy, the balance of the procurement was handled centrally by the Material Coordinating Agency—an adjunct of the Bureau of Ships—so that the numerous builders in the program would not have to bid against one another. Through vigorous follow-up action on materials ordered, the agency made possible the completion of construction schedules in record time.

The need for LSTs was urgent, and the program enjoyed a high priority throughout the war. Since most shipbuilding activities were located in coastal yards that were mainly used for construction of large, deep-draft ships, new construction facilities for the LSTs were established along inland waterways, some converted from heavy-industry plants, such as steel fabrication yards. Shifting the vessels was complicated by bridges across waterways, many of which were modified by the Navy to permit passage. A dedicated Navy "Ferry Command" orchestrated the transportation of newly constructed ships to coastal ports for final fitting out. Of the 1,051 LSTs built during the war, 670 were supplied by five "cornfield shipyards" in the Midwest. Dravo Corporation's facility at Neville Island, Pennsylvania, designated the lead shipyard for the project, built 145 vessels and developed fabrication techniques that reduced construction time and costs at all of the LST shipyards. The Missouri Valley Bridge & Iron Co. built the most LSTs of any shipyard, with 171 constructed at Evansville, Indiana. Chicago Bridge and Iron's shipyard in Seneca, Illinois, launched 156 ships and was specifically chosen because of their reputation and skills, particularly in welding. The American Bridge Company in Ambridge, Pennsylvania, built 119.

== Modifications ==
By 1943, the construction time for an LST had been reduced to four months. By the end of the war, this had been cut to two months. Considerable effort was expended to hold the ship's design constant, but, by mid-1943, operating experience led to the incorporation of certain changes in the new ships.

From LST-513, the elevator to transfer equipment between the tank deck and the main deck was replaced with a 12 by 32 ft (3.7 by 9.8 m) ramp that was hinged at the main deck. This allowed vehicles to be driven directly from the main deck down to the tank deck and then across the bow ramp to the beach or causeway, speeding the process of disembarkation.

Changes in the later LST-542 class included the addition of a navigation bridge; the installation of a water distillation plant with a capacity of 4,000 imperial gallons (18,000 L) per day; the removal of the tank deck ventilator tubes from the center section of the main deck; the strengthening of the main deck in order to carry a smaller Landing Craft Tank (LCT); and an upgrade in armor and armament, with the addition of a 3"/50 caliber gun.
