= LST Mk.3 =

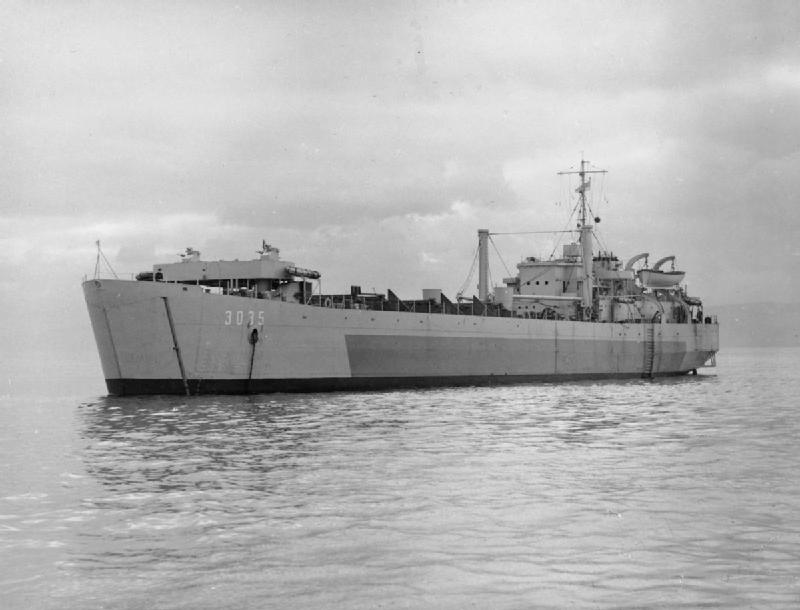
- HMS LST-3035

Class overview
- Name: LST (3)
- Builders: R & W. Hawthorn, Leslie & Co. Ltd, Harland and Wolff, Swan, Hunter & Wigham Richardson Ltd, Vickers-Armstrongs
- Operators: Royal Navy; Royal Australian Navy; Hellenic Navy; Royal Netherlands Navy
- Planned: 119
- Completed: UK: 31 × LST (3); 2 × LST (C); 2 × LST (Q); Canada: 26 × LST (3)
- Canceled: 40 + 6 scrapped before completion
- Active: 0
- Preserved: 0

General characteristics
- Displacement: 2,140 tons light; 4,980 long tons (5,060 t) full load
- Length: 347 ft (106 m) o/a
- Beam: 55 ft 2 in (16.81 m)
- Draught: Loaded: 4 ft 7 in (1.40 m) bow; 11 ft 6 in (3.51 m) stern
- Ramps: 23 feet by 14 feet ramp
- Propulsion: Twin screws, steam reciprocating engines, 5,500 hp (4,100 kW), 10 ft (3.0 m) propeller
- Speed: 13 knots (24 km/h; 15 mph)
- Capacity: 10 tanks plus 15 vehicles
- Troops: 13 officers and 150 men
- Complement: 14 officers and 90 men
- Armament: 8 × 20 mm Oerlikon for A/A defence on some ships

The LST Mk.3 was a class of Landing Ship, Tank developed by the United Kingdom.

== Design ==
The LST Mk.2 design was successful and production extensive, but there was still a need for more LSTs for British operations. As such, it was decided to build a further 80 of the ships in the UK and Canada to be available in the spring of 1945.

The British Staff drew up their own specification, requiring that the ship:

- Be able to embark and disembark tanks, motor transport, etc., on beaches of varying slopes; and amphibians and DD Sherman tanks into deep water.
- Carry five Landing Craft Assault (LCA), or similar craft, and one LCT (5) or LCT (6) on the upper deck, in place of transport, and, as an alternative to the LCT (5), two NL pontoon causeway to be carried; the LCT (5) and NL pontoon causeways to be capable of launching directly from the upper deck.
- To carry 500 tons of military load and to beach with that and sufficient fuel and stores for a 1,000 mi (1,600 km) return journey at 10 knots (19 km/h), on draughts 4 ft 6 in (1.37 m) forward and 11 ft 6 in (3.51 m) aft.
- To carry a load of sixty tons over the main ramp and ten tons over the vehicle ramp (i.e., the 50 ft (15 m) ramp from the upper deck to the bow door. After trials, this was removed from some vessels)
- To be fitted for operations in the tropics and in cold climates

Two major problems made a redesign necessary. The preferred light weight medium-speed (locomotive type) Electro-Motive Diesel 12-567 diesel engines were not immediately available. Staff wanted more power and higher speeds if possible, which the EMD engines could have provided. However, the only engines available were very heavy steam reciprocating engines from frigates that had been cancelled. These delivered two and a half times the power of the diesels. So large were they that significant changes had to be made to accommodate them. Lack of welded construction facilities meant that the hull had to be riveted. This combination of heavy hull and heavy engines meant that speed was only 3 knots (5.6 km/h) faster than the LCT (2).

At the same time, other improvements were made—as well as simplifications required so most of the structure could be assembled with rivets. The cutaway hard chine that had been dropped in the American version of the Mark 2 vessels was restored. The tank deck, which was above the waterline, was made parallel to the keel, there was to be no round down to the upper deck, and the ship was enlarged to accommodate the more bulky machinery.

Provision was made for carrying the British Landing Craft Assault (LCA) in gravity davits, instead of American assault craft. Provision was also made for carrying Landing Craft Tank (LCT) and Landing Craft Mechanized (LCM), and NL pontoon causeways.

When the design commenced, engineers knew that the beaches where the ships were expected to land would be very flat, but it was not possible to produce a satisfactory vessel with a 3 ft (0.91 m) draught forward, and very little keel slope, so the 1 in 50 keel slope was maintained. It was known that the 1:50 slope would often result in the LST grounding aft on a shallow beach, resulting in the vehicles being discharged into comparatively deep water.

Various methods had been investigated to overcome the problem, but heavy grounding skegs and the N.L. pontoon causeways were finally accepted as standard; the pontoon causeways were formed of pontoons 7 ft (2.1 m) × 5 ft × 5 ft (1.5 m), made up into strings and rafts. When offloading, the rafts were secured to the fore end of the ship, and the load discharged directly onto the shore, or towed on the raft to the shore.

The ships were fitted out for service in both very cold and tropical conditions. The accommodation provided for both crew and army personnel was greatly improved compared with LST (2). The main hazard, apart from enemy action, was fire on the tank deck. Fire sprinklers were provided, but the water drenching system installed in later American vessels could not be provided.

The bow door arrangements were similar to the LST (2), but the design arranged the bow ramp in two parts in an attempt to increase the number of beaches where direct discharge would be possible. The machinery for operating the bow doors and ramp were electrical, but otherwise, steam auxiliaries replaced the electrical gear on the LST (2).

The general arrangements of the tank deck were similar, but the design increased headroom and added a ramp to the top deck, as in later LST (2)s. Provision was made for carrying LCA on gravity davits instead of the American built assault boats. The arrangements were generally an improvement over the LST (2), but suffered from a deeper draught, and, to some extent, from the haste of construction.

The first orders were placed in December 1943 with British builders, and 35 with Canadian builders. Swan Hunter delivered the first ships in December 1944. During 1944, follow up orders were placed in Canada for a further 36. These programmes were in full swing when the war ended, but not all vessels were completed.

The ships were numbered numbers LST-3001 to LST-3045 and LST-3501 to LST-3534. LST−3535 and later were cancelled.

Fifteen 40-ton tanks or 27 25-ton tanks could be carried on the tank deck with an additional fourteen lorries on the weather deck.

== Propulsion ==
Steam was supplied by a pair of Admiralty pattern 3-drum water-tube type boilers, working at 225 pounds per square inch (1,550 kPa). The main engines were of the 4-cylinder triple expansion 4-crank type, balanced on the Yarrow-Tweedy-Slick system, the cylinders being as follows:

High pressure	18.5 in diameter
Medium pressure	31.0 in diameter
Forward low pressure	38.5 in diameter
Aft low pressure	38.5 in diameter

The common stroke was 30 inches (760 mm). The piston and slide valve rods were all fitted with metallic packing to the stuffing boxes, and all pistons fitted with packing rings and springs. The high-pressure valve was of the piston type, whilst the remaining ones were of the balanced type. The main engines were designed to develop 2,750 hp (2,050 kW) at 185 rpm continuously.

With the ships being twin screw, the engines were fitted with a shaft coupling to the crank shaft at the forward end, allowing the engine to be turned end to end to suit either port or starboard side fitting.

== Modifications for landing craft ==
When the LST (3)s were ordered, the LST (2) programme was in full swing, and similar arrangements were made to enable the LSTs to carry the 112 feet (34 m) long LCT5 or LCT6 that were being built in America for the Royal Navy.

The LCT needed lifting onto the deck of the ship, being carried on wedge-shaped support blocks; at the time of launching she was set down on the "launch ways" by simply slacking off bolts in the wedge blocks, allowing the launch way to take the weight. To carry out a launch, the LST was heeled over about 11 degrees by careful flooding of tanks in the hull. The height of the drop was about 10 ft (3.0 m). Once launched in this way, the propeller shafts were reconnected (together with some minor "unpacking" work) and the LCT was ready for operation.

This method was used for moving LCT5s from Britain to the Far East, although there seems to be no reference to LST (3)s being used, most being completed late in or after the war.

Even at the end of the war there was a need for more ships able to carry minor landing craft, and two of the LST (3)s then completing were specially fitted to carry LCM (7). These craft, which were 58 ft (18 m) long and weighed about 28 tons, were carried transversely on the upper deck of the ship. They were hoisted on by means of a specially fitted 30-ton derrick; This 30-ton derrick replaced a 15-ton derrick, two of which were the standard fit of the LST (3). The 30-ton derrick was taller and generally more substantial than the 15 ton one.

The LCM (7)s were landed on trolleys fitted with hydraulic jacks. These ran on rails down each side of the deck, and were hauled to and fro by means of winches. The stowage was filled from fore to aft as each craft was jacked down onto fixed cradles between the rails. The ships completed to this standard were LST-3043/HMS Messina, and LST-3044/HMS Narvik. While these ships were able to carry LCMs, they were only able to carry out loading and unloading operations under nearly ideal weather conditions, and therefore could not be used for assault operations; they also lacked the facilities to maintain the landing craft (which the Dock Landing Ships provided).

The Landing Craft Assault were wooden-hulled vessels plated with armour, 41 ft 6 in (12.65 m) long overall, 10 ft (3.0 m) wide, and displacing 13 tons fully loaded. Draught was 2 ft 3 in (0.69 m), and normal load was 35 troops with 800 lb (360 kg) of equipment. A pair of Scripps marine conversions of Ford V8 engines gave it speeds of 11 knots (20 km/h) unloaded, 8 knots (15 km/h) service speed, 3 knots (5.6 km/h) on one engine. Range was 50–80 miles (80–130 km) miles on 64 imperial gallons (290 L). Armament was typically a Bren light machine gun aft; with two Lewis Guns in a port forward position.

The LCM (7)s that were carried on the LST (2) were considerably larger, 60 ft 3 in (18.36 m) in length, 16 ft (4.9 m) beam, with a hoisting weight of 28 tons, full load displacement of 63 tons. Beaching draught was 3 ft 8 in (1.12 m), and propulsion was provided by a pair of Hudson Invader petrol engines, later replaced with Grays diesels, both sets providing 290 bhp (220 kW), giving a speed of 9.8 knots (18.1 km/h).

The main requirement of the design was to carry a 40-ton Churchill tank or bulldozer at 10 knots (19 km/h). 140 had been completed when the war ended, and some saw service through to the 1970s.

== Variants ==
Some LST (3)s were converted to LST (A) (A for "assault") by adding stiffening so they could safely carry the heaviest British tanks.

Two LST (3)s were converted to command vessels, LST (C): LST 3043 and LST 3044. Post war they became HMS Messina (L112) and HMS Narvik (L114). They were better armed with ten 20 mm Oerlikons and four 40 mm Bofors.

Two LST (3)s were converted during building into Headquarters command ships LST (Q). These were L3012, which became L3101 (and later HMS Ben Nevis) and LST 3013, which became LST 3102, and then HMS Ben Lomond. They acted as LST "mother ships", similar in most aspects to American ships based on the LST (2) hull. They had two Quonset huts erected on the main deck to accommodate 40 officers. Berths on the tank deck berthed an extra 196 men. A bake shop and 16 refrigeration boxes for fresh provisions augmented the facilities normally provided for the crew. Four extra distilling units were added, and the ballast tanks were converted for the storage of fresh water.
