= USS Stone County =

LST-542-class landing ship tank

Coordinates: 8.0469132°N 98.9075655°E

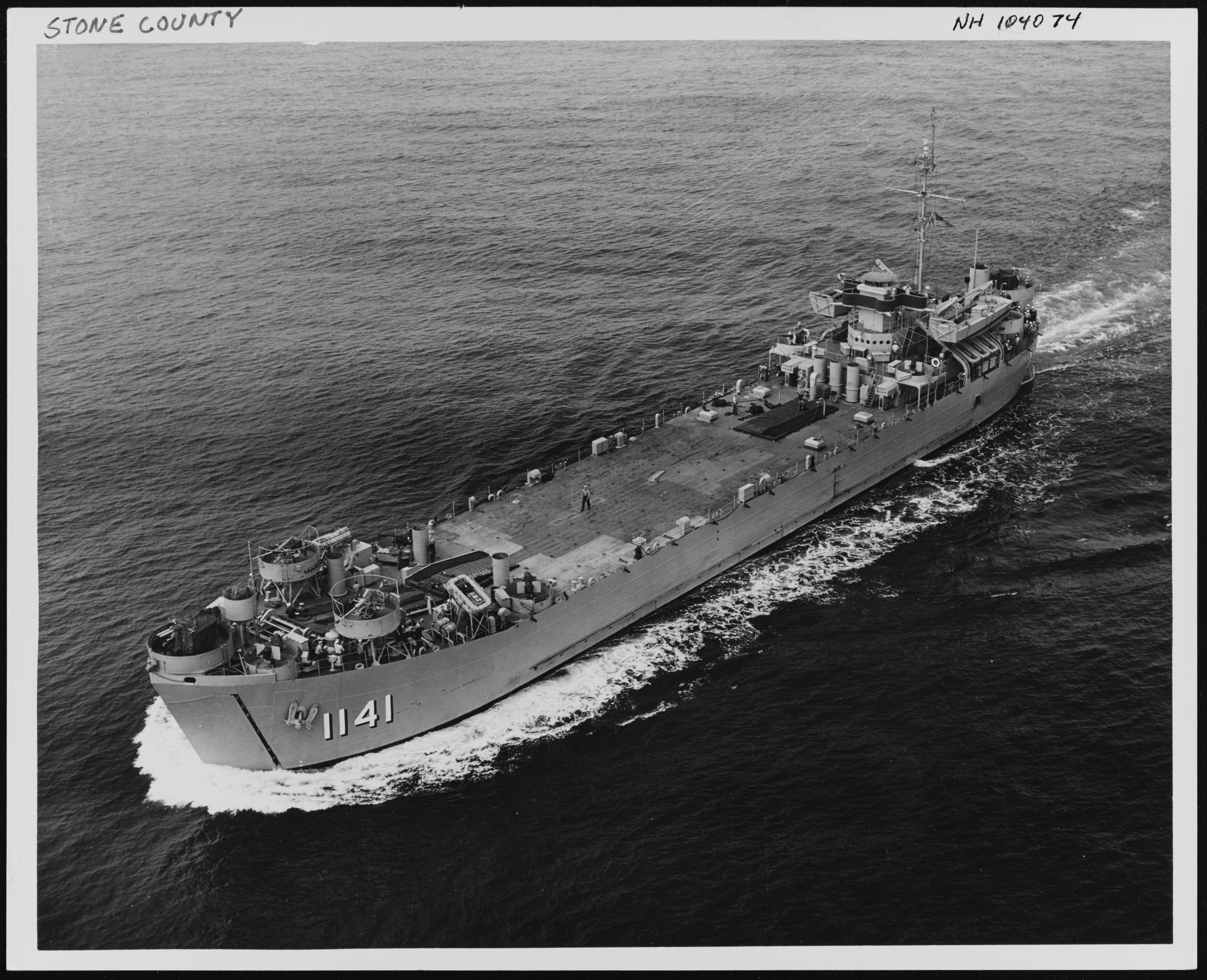
- USS Stone County in the 1950s

History

United States
- Name: LST-1141
- Builder: Chicago Bridge and Iron Co., Seneca
- Laid down: 22 January 1945
- Launched: 18 April 1945
- Sponsored by: Mrs Gwendolyn K. Bartels
- Commissioned: 9 May 1945
- Decommissioned: 24 August 1949
- Recommissioned: 3 November 1950
- Renamed: Stone County
- Namesake: Stone County
- Decommissioned: May 1970
- Stricken: 15 August 1973
- Identification: Callsign: NKHC; Pennant number: LST-1141
- Fate: Transferred to Thailand, 1970
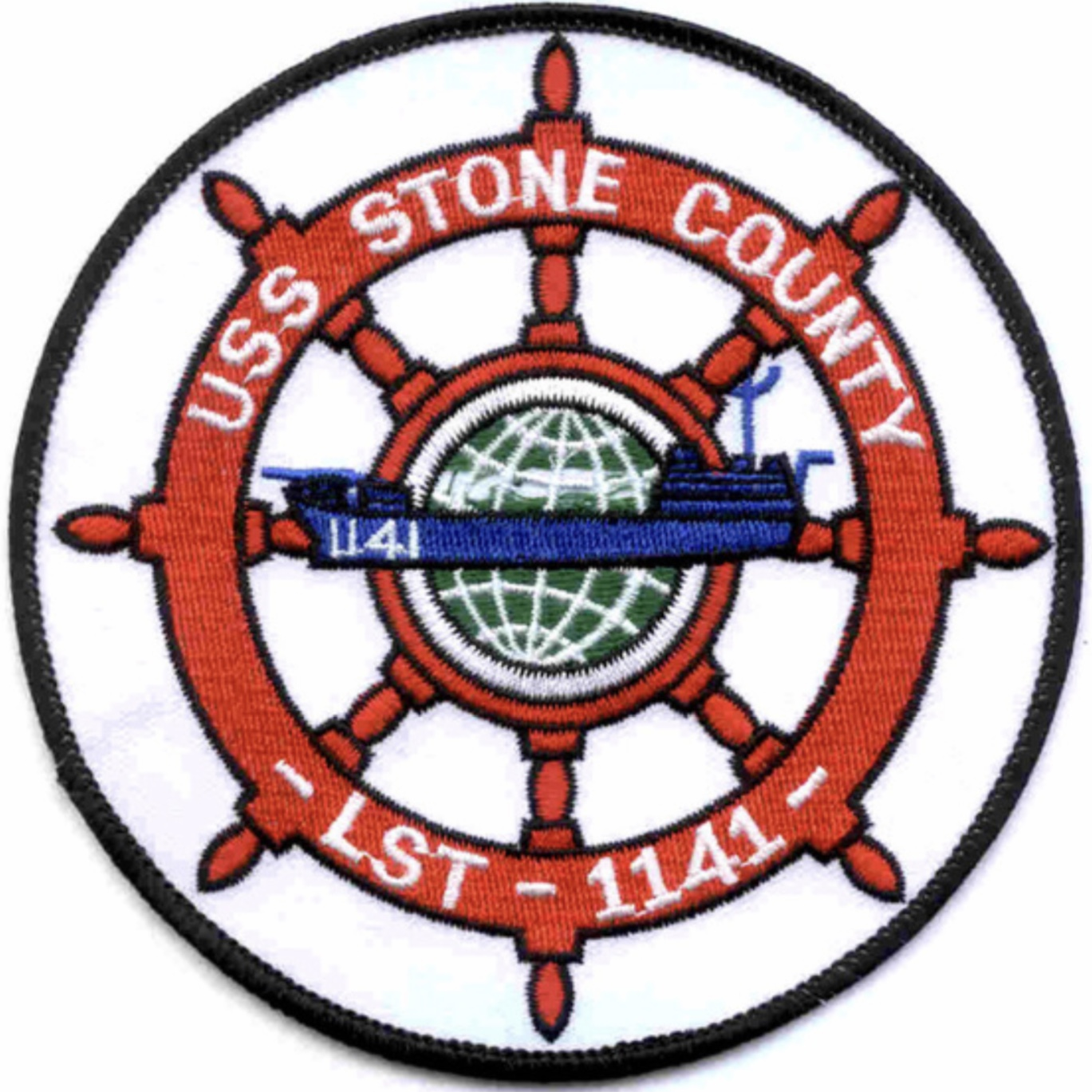
- Badge

Thailand
- Name: Lanta
- Namesake: Lanta Islands
- Acquired: 12 March 1970
- Commissioned: 12 March 1970
- Decommissioned: 2008
- Identification: Pennant number: LST-4, LST-714
- Status: Museum ship in Krabi

General characteristics
- Class & type: LST-542-class tank landing ship
- Displacement: 1,625 long tons (1,651 t) light; 4,080 long tons (4,145 t) full
- Length: 328 ft (100 m)
- Beam: 50 ft (15 m)
- Draft: Unloaded : 2 ft 4 in (0.71 m) forward; 7 ft 6 in (2.29 m) aft; Loaded : 8 ft 2 in (2.49 m) forward; 14 ft 1 in (4.29 m) aft
- Propulsion: 2 × General Motors 12-567 diesel engines, two shafts, twin rudders
- Speed: 12 knots (22 km/h; 14 mph)
- Boats & landing craft carried: 2 × LCVPs
- Troops: 16 officers, 147 enlisted men
- Complement: 7 officers, 104 enlisted men
- Armament: 8 × 40 mm guns; 12 × 20 mm guns

USS Stone County (LST-1141) was a LST-542-class tank landing ship in the United States Navy during World War II. She was transferred to the Royal Thai Navy as HTMS Lanta (LST-4) (Thai: เรือหลวงลันตา).

== Construction and commissioning ==
LST-1141 was laid down on 22 January 1945 at Chicago Bridge and Iron Company, Seneca, Illinois. Launched on 18 April 1945 and commissioned on 9 May 1945.

=== Service in the United States Navy ===
During World War II, LST-1130 was assigned to the Asiatic-Pacific theater. She was assigned to occupation and China in the Far East with multiple tours from 6 October 1945 to 12 February 1955.

She was decommissioned on 24 August 1949 to be mothballed in the Pacific Reserve Fleet San Diego.

During the start of the Korean War, she was recommissioned on 3 November 1950 and participated in the UN Summer-Fall Offensive from 4 to 5 September and 21 September to 2 October 1951. She took part also in the Second Korean Winter from 11 to 12 January 1952 and Third Korean Winter from 21 March to 19 April 1953. In conclusion, she participated in the Korea Summer-Fall 1953 from 7 to 17 May 1953, 18 to 19 June and 26 to 27 July 1953.

On 1 July 1955, she was given the name Stone County (LST-1141).

As the United States joined the Vietnam War, she joined the Vietnam Defense from 7 to 24 September 1965, Vietnamese Counteroffensive from 10 to 22 June 1966, Vietnamese Counteroffensive Phase II from 17 July to 26 September and 20 to 30 October 1966, Vietnamese Counteroffensive Phase IV from 25 April to 13 June 1966 and lastly, the Vietnamese Counteroffensive Phase V from 2 to July and 9 August to 6 September 1968.

She was decommissioned in May 1970 at Apra, Guam and struck from the Naval Register on 15 August 1973.

=== Service in the Royal Thai Navy ===
The former Stone County was transferred to Thailand during the lend-lease program on 12 March 1970 and later sold to them on 15 August 1973. The ship was renamed HTMS Lanta (LST-4).

Between 1995 and 1997, her pennant number was changed to HTMS Lanta (LST-714).

She was homeported in Phra Samut Chedi alongside HTMS Pangan and HTMS Chang.

The ship was retired from the Royal Thai Navy in 2008 and used as a training ship alongside other LSTs.

She was decommissioned and placed in the Krabi Harbor as a museum ship.

== Awards ==
LST-1141 have earned the following awards:

- Combat Action Ribbon (Vietnam, 5 March 1968)
- China Service Medal (extended)
- American Campaign Medal
- Asiatic-Pacific Campaign Medal
- World War II Victory Medal
- Navy Occupation Service Medal (with Asia clasp)
- National Defense Service Medal (2 battle stars)
- Korean Service Medal (4 battle stars)
- Vietnam Service Medal (5 battle starts)
- Republic of Vietnam Gallantry Cross Unit Citation (5 battle stars)
- United Nations Service Medal
- Republic of Vietnam Campaign Medal
- Republic of Korea War Service Medal
