= Evansville Wartime Museum =

- Location within Indiana
- Established: 2012
- Location: Evansville, Indiana
- Coordinates: 38.0416°N 87.537°W
- Type: Military museum
- President: John Gross
- Curator: McKay Miles
- Website: www.evansvillewartimemuseum.org

The Evansville Wartime Museum is a military museum located at the Evansville Regional Airport in Evansville, Indiana.

== History ==
=== Background ===
During World War II, Evansville was the site of a Republic Aviation factory that built Republic P-47 Thunderbolts.

Plans to obtain an aircraft for display in the city began as early as 1986, when a former supervisor at the plant, Frank Whetsel, purchased the wreckage of a P-47D, serial number 42-8320, that had crashed in Lake Kerr in Florida and founded the P-47 Heritage Commission. (Note: An airport terminal was under construction at the Evansville Regional Airport and the goal was to display it there.) The airplane arrived in Evansville the following February and was delivered to the University of Southern Indiana. The Commission attempted to raise money by holding a bingo game in 1991, but was accused of violating state gambling laws.

As a result of the commission's difficulties, a new group called the P-47 Foundation, led by Andy Easley, purchased the project from the commission. Following Frank's death in 1992, his son Jim took over the project with the intent of building a hangar in which to display the airplane. However, the airframe was destroyed on 18 March 1997 in a fire at the Franklin Industrial Center where it was being restored. Immediately following the fire, the foundation attempted to obtain an example from the Air Force Museum System, but was unsuccessful. It was also forced to return an engine that had been on loan.

=== Establishment ===
Despite the loss of the P-47, the goal of representing the role of the city during World War II remained. As a result, in 2012 the Freedom Heritage Museum was founded by Richard Litov and John Dunn. Announced the following year, it planned to renovate a hangar at the Evansville Regional Airport. It was envisioned that the facility would complement LST-325 docked on the Ohio River in downtown Evansville. Jack Buttrum, a member of the Ivy Tech Community College board, was named executive director in early 2014. (Note: Sean Georges took over as executive director in 2023.) As part of the effort, the museum held a number of events later that year. (Note: These included a ground school as part of a reenactment and airshow involving two P-47s in June, inviting three P-47 pilots to Evansville for a "mini-reunion" and recorded interviews in September and sponsoring the showing of a film about the June reenactment in October.) The museum opened on 27 May 2017, shortly after changing its name to the Evansville Wartime Museum. (Note: A former museum president had filed a lawsuit claiming trademark of the previous name.) The P-47 Foundation was finally able to acquire a P-47, Tarheel Hal, from the Lone Star Flight Museum in 2020 and it was placed on loan to the museum. (Note: The P-47 Foundation is officially a separate organization that partners with the museum.) The airplane was repainted the next year as Hoosier Spirit II, to represent the first P-47 built in Indiana. Following an effort by the foundation, the P-47 was designated the official state aircraft of Indiana in 2021. Another designation was awarded the following year when, in part through the museum's efforts, Evansville was named a World War II Heritage City.

The museum was significantly damaged by a storm on 2 April 2024, with roughly one quarter of the roof being blown off. A month after the storm, while still closed for repairs, it once again began offering tank rides. With temporary repairs completed, the museum reopened with limited hours on 3 August 2024.

== Exhibits ==
The museum has a number of galleries focused on World War I, World War II, the Korean War and Vietnam War as well as three flight simulators. The Rechnic Holocaust Exhibit features a 10-minute video and covers the journey of the Rechnic family from Poland to Evansville.

== Collection ==
=== Aircraft ===
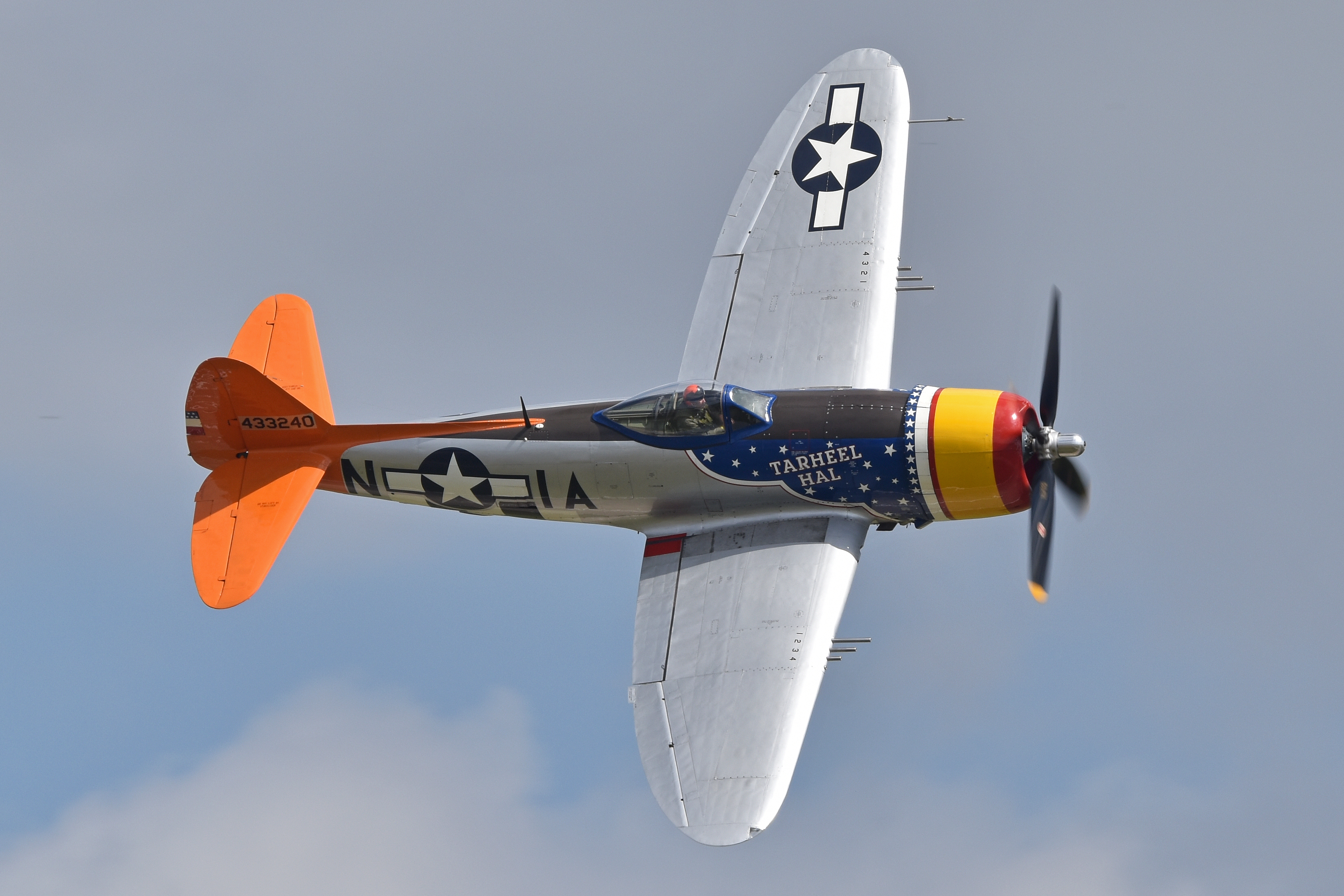
The museum's P-47D with its previous name, Tarheel Tal

- Boeing N2S-1
- Republic P-47D Thunderbolt

=== Ground vehicles ===
- DUKW
- M4A4 Sherman

== Events ==
The museum periodically holds a Warbird Weekend where retired military aircraft from other organizations visit the museum.

== Programs ==
The museum offers rides in its M4 Sherman tank. The 30-minute session takes place on the airport and includes a presentation about the history of the vehicle and an orientation. It also holds presentations called Lunch, Learn and Share twice a month. The museum also conducts outreach to nearby museums and schools.

== See also ==
- Indiana Military Museum – a military museum in nearby Vincennes, Indiana
- USS LST Ship Memorial Museum – a museum concentrating on Evansville's production of LSTs in Downtown Evansville
