= USS LST-393 =

1942 LST-1-class tank landing ship

Coordinates: 43.23461°N 86.25893°W

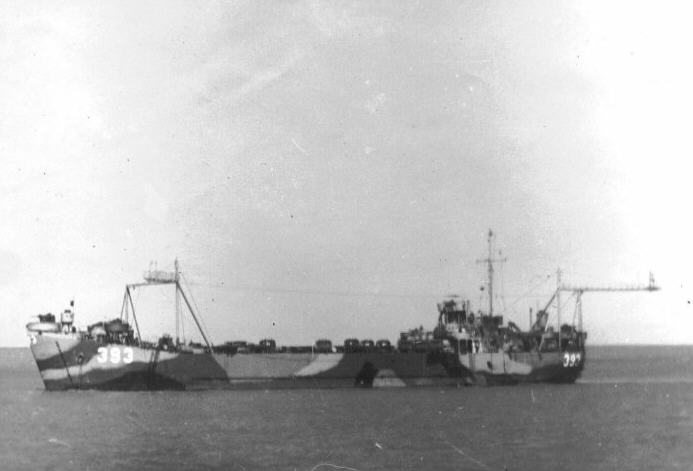
- LST 393 seen in full camouflage paint in 1945.

History

United States
- Name: USS LST 393
- Builder: Newport News Shipbuilding and Drydock Company, Newport News, Virginia
- Laid down: 27 July 1942
- Launched: 11 November 1942
- Commissioned: 11 December 1942
- Decommissioned: 1 March 1946
- Stricken: 14 March 1947
- Identification: IMO number: 5150331
- Honours and awards: 3 battle stars (WWII)
- Status: Museum ship in Muskegon, MI.

General characteristics
- Class & type: LST-1-class tank landing ship
- Displacement: 1,780 long tons (1,809 t) light; 3,880 long tons (3,942 t) full
- Length: 328 ft (100 m)
- Beam: 50 ft (15 m)
- Draft: Unloaded: Bow: 2 ft 4 in (0.71 m); Stern: 7 ft 6 in (2.29 m); Loaded : Bow: 8 ft 2 in (2.49 m); Stern: 14 ft 1 in (4.29 m)
- Depth: 8 ft (2.4 m) forward; 14 ft 4 in (4.37 m) aft (full load)
- Propulsion: 2 General Motors 12-567 diesel engines, two shafts, twin rudders
- Speed: 12 knots (22 km/h; 14 mph)
- Boats & landing craft carried: Two or six LCVPs
- Troops: approx. 140 officers and enlisted
- Complement: 8-10 officers, 100-115 enlisted
- Armament: 1 × single 3"/50 caliber gun mount; 5 × 40 mm gun mounts; 6 × 20 mm gun mounts; 2 × .50 cal (12.7 mm) machine guns; 4 × .30 cal (7.62 mm) machine guns

USS LST 393 is an LST-1-class tank landing ship built for the United States Navy during World War II. She is one of only two LSTs to survive in original configuration; 1,051 were built. She is now a museum ship in Muskegon, Michigan.

== World War II ==
LST 393 was laid down on 27 July 1942 at the Newport News Shipbuilding & Drydock Company and launched on 11 November 1942. She was commissioned on 11 December 1942.

During World War II, LST-393 was assigned to the European Theater and participated in the following operations: the Sicilian occupation (July 1943); the Salerno landings (September 1943); and the Invasion of Normandy (June 1944). She won three battles stars for those missions.

LST 393 arrived in the Omaha Beach zone on the night of 6 June 1944. After off-loading Sherman tanks as well as other war material, the ship spent two days high and dry, trapped by Normandy's fickle tides. She made 30 round trips to Omaha Beach, bringing varied equipment and supplies to France and returning with wounded soldiers as well as thousands of German prisoners.

LST 393 was one of a few LSTs to be equipped with an airplane deployed and recovered via the Brodie landing system. A wire was rigged from bow to stern off the port side and a L-4 Grasshopper was able to take off and land using a snare pole.

After service in the invasion of France, LST 393 was assigned to return to the U.S. east coast for a refit. At that time, she was tasked to be included in the planned Invasion of Japan; she was then painted in tropical camouflage. She was on her way to the Panama Canal for a transit to the Pacific Ocean when the war ended in September 1945.

U.S. military records show the ship made 75 voyages to foreign shores and covered some 51,817 nautical miles in her first three years of service; her anchor touched bottom in 38 parts of North Africa, Sicily, Italy, England, Wales, Ireland, France and the Canal Zone. LST 393 is credited with carrying 9,135 soldiers – more than one-half of an Army division – and 3,248 vehicles ranging from Long Tom howitzers to Jeeps. Records show she also carried 5,373 prisoners of war and 817 casualties.

== Post-war ferry service ==
Following the War, LST 393 returned to the United States, was decommissioned on 1 March 1946, and struck from the Naval Vessel Register on 14 March 1947. On 28 March 1948, the tank landing ship was sold to the Sand Products Corporation of Detroit, Michigan, for conversion to merchant service and renamed Highway 16. She would be a waterborne extension of the former U.S. Highway 16. That roadway—later replaced by Interstate 96—ran from Detroit to Muskegon in Michigan, and from Milwaukee, WI to Yellowstone National Park. The converted LST, with its distinctive bow doors welded shut and the tank deck adapted to carry new cars, served to span Lake Michigan to Milwaukee where US 16 began again.

== Museum ship ==
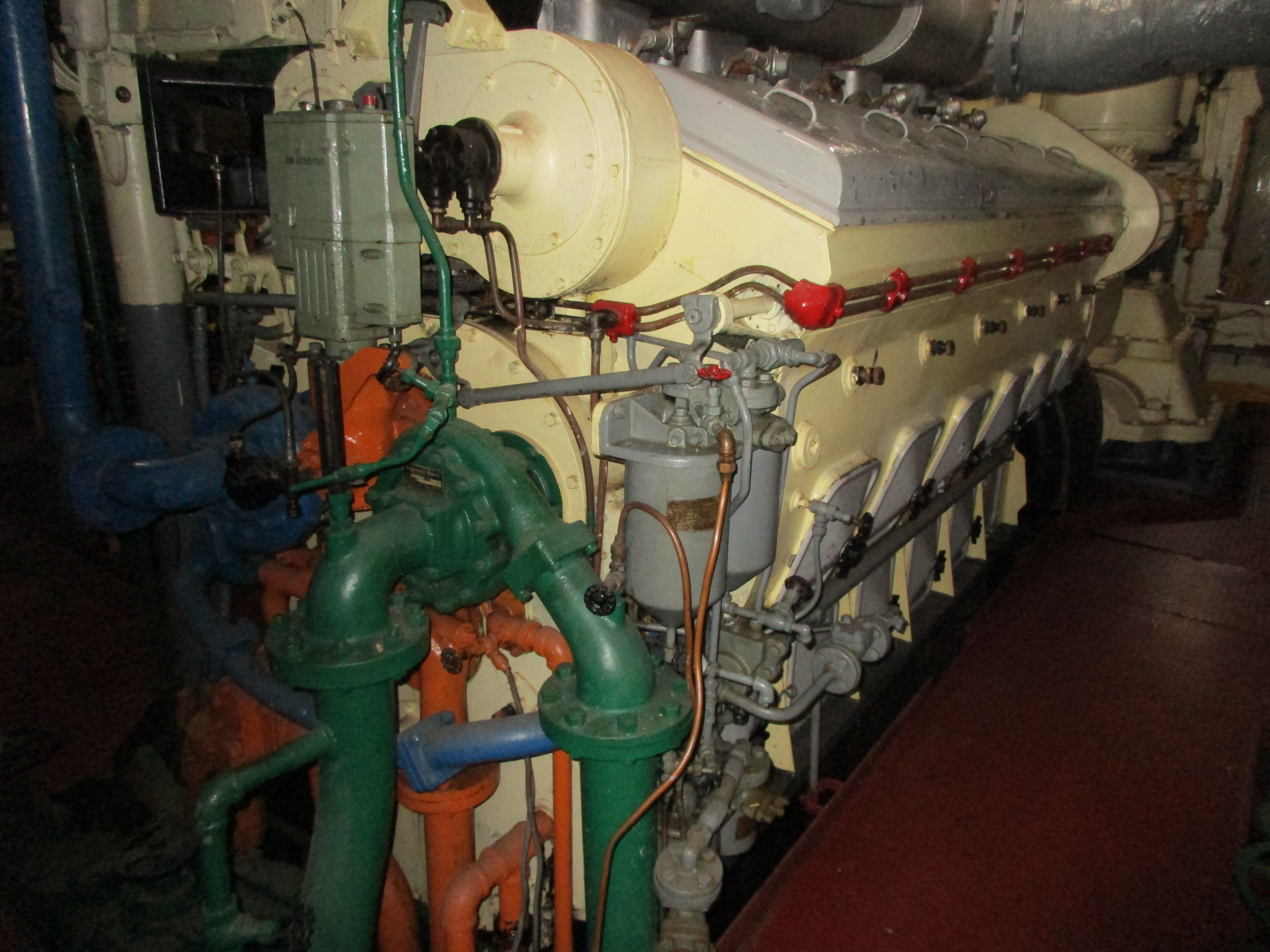
A GM EMD 12-567ATLP diesel engine as installed in LST 393 (Landing Ship Tank), July 2017

Two groups have attempted to restore LST 393 to its former glory. A Muskegon Museum group went to work in 2000 and made some headway, along with some help from the Michigan LST Association. But that effort faltered after about two years.

In 2005, a group headed by Muskegon residents Dan Weikel and Bob Wygant asked for permission from owner Sand Products Corp. to pick up where the other group left off. Years of cleaning and painting resulted in a ship that could be toured. In 2007, extraordinary efforts led to the opening of the bow doors, which hadn't moved since they were welded shut in the late 1940s.

Development of the veteran's museum has continued with the addition of thousands of artifacts as well as restoration of most areas of the ship. The effort led to the USS LST 393 Veterans Museum.

== See also ==
- USS LST-325, another LST preserved as a museum
- List of United States Navy LSTs
