= USS Stark County =

1945 LST-542-class tank landing ship

Coordinates: 9.7124120°N 99.9839715°E

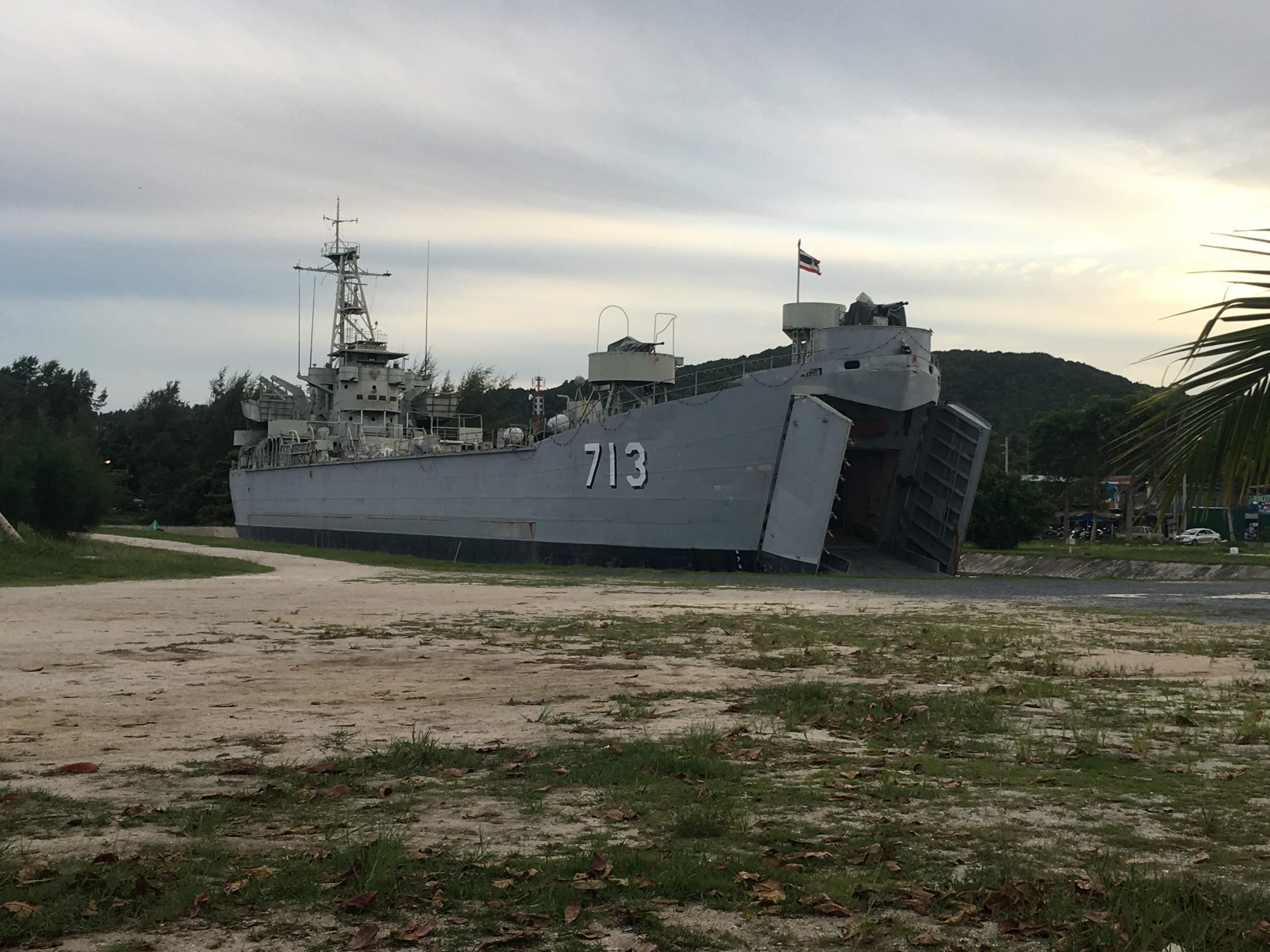
- Pangan as a museum ship in 2018

History

United States
- Name: LST-1134
- Builder: Chicago Bridge and Iron Co., Illinois
- Laid down: 18 December 1944
- Launched: 16 March 1945
- Commissioned: 7 April 1945
- Decommissioned: 16 May 1966
- Renamed: Stark County
- Identification: Callsign: NKGO; Pennant number: LST-1134
- Fate: Transferred to Royal Thai Navy, 16 May 1966

History

Thailand
- Name: Pangan; (พงัน)
- Namesake: Pha-ngan Island
- Commissioned: 1966
- Decommissioned: 2008
- Reclassified: LST-713
- Identification: Pennant number: LST-13, LST-713
- Status: Museum ship in Ko Pha-ngan, Surat Thani

General characteristics
- Class & type: LST-542-class tank landing ship
- Displacement: 1,625 long tons (1,651 t) (light); 4,080 long tons (4,145 t) (full (seagoing draft with 1,675 short tons (1,520 t) load); 2,366 long tons (2,404 t) (beaching)
- Length: 328 ft (100 m) oa
- Beam: 50 ft (15 m)
- Draft: Unloaded: 2 ft 4 in (0.71 m) forward; 7 ft 6 in (2.29 m) aft; Full load: 8 ft 3 in (2.51 m) forward; 14 ft 1 in (4.29 m) aft; Landing with 500 short tons (450 t) load: 3 ft 11 in (1.19 m) forward; 9 ft 10 in (3.00 m) aft; Limiting 11 ft 2 in (3.40 m); Maximum navigation 14 ft 1 in (4.29 m)
- Installed power: 2 × 900 hp (670 kW) Electro-Motive Diesel 12-567A diesel engines; 1,800 shp (1,300 kW)
- Propulsion: 1 × Falk main reduction gears; 2 × Propellers
- Speed: 11.6 kn (21.5 km/h; 13.3 mph)
- Range: 24,000 nmi (44,000 km; 28,000 mi) at 9 kn (17 km/h; 10 mph) while displacing 3,960 long tons (4,024 t)
- Boats & landing craft carried: 2 x LCVPs
- Capacity: 1,600–1,900 short tons (3,200,000–3,800,000 lb; 1,500,000–1,700,000 kg) cargo depending on mission
- Troops: 16 officers, 147 enlisted men
- Complement: 7 officers, 104 enlisted men
- Armament: Varied, ultimate armament; 2 × twin 40 mm (1.57 in) Bofors guns; 4 × single 40 mm Bofors guns; 12 × 20 mm (0.79 in) Oerlikon cannons
- Aviation facilities: Deck as helipad

USS Stark County (LST-1134) was an LST-542-class tank landing ship in the United States Navy during World War II. She was transferred to the Royal Thai Navy as HTMS Pangan (LST-13) (Thai: เรือหลวงพงัน).

== Construction and commissioning ==
LST-1134 was laid down on 18 December 1944 at Chicago Bridge & Iron Company, Seneca, illonois. Launched on 16 March 1945 and commissioned on 7 April 1945.

=== Service in United States Navy ===
She was commissioned too late to see service in World War II but was assigned to occupation service in the Far East from 15 September 1945 to 4 January 1946.

During the Korean War, she participated in the invasion of Inchon from 13 to 17 September 1950.

On 1 July 1955, she was given the name USS Stark County.

She was decommissioned on 16 May 1966 and transferred to the Royal Thai Navy.

LST-1134 earned three battle stars for Cold War service.

=== Service in Royal Thai Navy ===
She was renamed HTMS Pangan (LST-13) once acquired by the navy. She was homeported in Phra Samut Chedi alongside HTMS Lanta and HTMS Chang.

The ship was retired from the Royal Thai Navy in 2008 and used as a training ship alongside other LSTs.

She arrived in Koh Phangan on 21 January 2011 to be converted into museum ship.

== Awards ==
LST-1134 have earned the following awards:

- American Campaign Medal
- Asiatic-Pacific Campaign Medal
- World War II Victory Medal
- Navy Occupation Service Medal (with Asia clasp)
- National Defense Service Medal
- Korean Service Medal (3 battle stars)
- United Nations Service Medal
- Republic of Korea War Service Medal (retroactive)
