= USS LST-849 =

US Navy tank landing ship

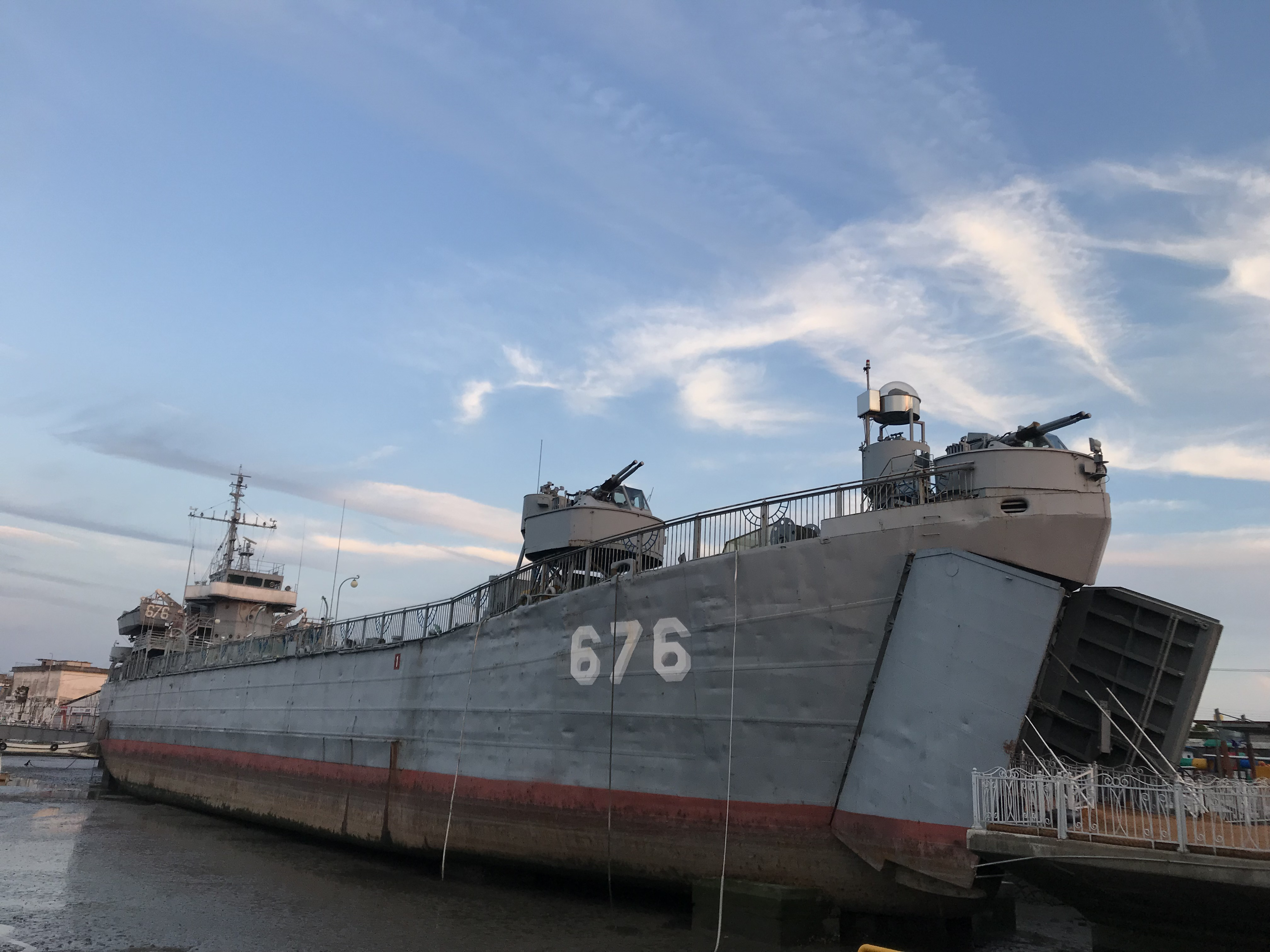
- ROKS Wi Bong (LST-676) as a museum ship in 2018

History

United States
- Name: USS Johnson County (LST-849)
- Laid down: 10 November 1944
- Launched: 30 December 1944
- Commissioned: 16 January 1945
- Decommissioned: 13 June 1946
- Fate: Transferred to Korea in January 1959

South Korea
- Name: Wi Bong; (위봉)
- Acquired: 22 December 1958
- Decommissioned: 31 December 2006
- Fate: Educational Display, Jinpo Maritime Park, Gunsan, South Korea
- Status: Museum ship

General characteristics
- Class & type: LST-542-class LST
- Displacement: 1,490 tons (light); 4,080 tons (full load of 2,100 tons)
- Length: 328 ft (100 m)
- Beam: 50 ft (15 m)
- Draft: 8 ft (2.4 m) forward; 14 ft 4 in (4.37 m) aft (full load)
- Propulsion: Two diesel engines, two shafts
- Speed: 10.8 knots (20 km/h) (max); 9 knots (17 km/h) (econ)
- Complement: 7 officers, 204 enlisted
- Armament: 8 × 40 mm guns; 12 × 20 mm guns

USS LST-849 was an LST-542-class tank landing ship in the United States Navy during World War II. Late in her U.S. Navy career, she was renamed Johnson County (LST-849)—after counties in Arkansas, Georgia, Illinois, Indiana, Iowa, Kansas, Kentucky, Missouri, Nebraska, Tennessee, Texas, and Wyoming—but never saw active service under that name.

LST-849 was laid down on 10 November 1944 at Ambridge, Pennsylvania, by the American Bridge Co.; launched on 30 December 1944; sponsored by Mrs. William B. Hetzel; and commissioned on 16 January 1945.

During World War II, LST-849 was assigned to the Asiatic-Pacific theater and participated in the assault and occupation of Okinawa Gunto in May and June 1945. Following the war, LST-849 performed occupation duty in the Far East until mid-September 1945. She returned to the United States and was decommissioned on 13 June 1946 and assigned to the Pacific Reserve Fleet. While berthed in the Columbia River with the Pacific Reserve Fleet, she was named Johnson County 1 July 1955, after counties in 12 states.

Under provisions of the Military Assistance Program, she was transferred to the Republic of Korea January 1959, and served the ROK navy as Wi Bong (LST-812).

LST-849 earned one battle star for World War II service.

== ROKS Wi Bong ==
The ship was transferred to the Republic of Korea on 22 December 1958, and renamed ROKS Wi Bong (LST-812). She was later redesignated LST-676.

The ship participated in 16 combat missions in Vietnam.

On 31 December 2006 LST-676 was retired from active service in the Korean Navy.

On 25 December 2007 Gunsan city signed a contract with the Korean Navy to move the ship to Jinpo Maritime Park (35.98966°N 126.71716°E) to serve as an educational landmark.
