= USS Pender County =

1945 LST-542-class tank landing ship

Coordinates: 36.8913416°N 126.8249075°E

History

United States
- Name: USS LST-1080
- Builder: Bethlehem-Hingham Shipyard
- Laid down: 5 April 1945
- Launched: 2 May 1945
- Commissioned: 29 May 1945
- Decommissioned: 29 August 1946
- Recommissioned: 3 October 1950
- Renamed: USS Pender County (LST-1080), 1 July 1955
- Decommissioned: 2 January 1958
- Stricken: 6 February 1959
- Honors and awards: 4 battle stars
- Fate: Transferred to South Korea, January 1959

South Korea
- Name: Hwa San (LST-816); (화산)
- Acquired: January 1959
- Reclassified: LST-679
- Fate: Museum ship

General characteristics
- Class & type: LST-542-class LST
- Displacement: 1,490 tons (light); 4,080 tons (full load of 2,100 tons)
- Length: 328 ft (100 m)
- Beam: 50 ft (15 m)
- Draft: 8 ft (2.4 m) forward; 14 ft 4 in (4.37 m) aft (full load)
- Propulsion: Two diesel engines, two shafts
- Speed: 10.8 knots (20 km/h) (max); 9 knots (17 km/h) (econ)
- Complement: 7 officers, 204 enlisted
- Armament: 8 × 40 mm guns; 12 × 20 mm guns

USS Pender County (LST-1080) was an LST-542-class tank landing ship in the United States Navy. She is now ROKS Hwa San (LST-816), a museum ship in South Korea.

Unlike many of her class, which received only numbers and were disposed of after World War II, she survived long enough to be named. On 1 July 1955, all LSTs still in commission were named for US counties or parishes; LST-1080 was given the name Pender County, after a county in North Carolina.

LST-1080 was laid down on 10 November 1944 at Hingham, Massachusetts, by the Bethlehem-Hingham Shipyard, Inc.; launched on 2 May 1945; and commissioned on 29 May 1945.

After shakedown, LST-1080 sailed for the Pacific Ocean via the Panama Canal. The landing ship performed logistics missions and service force lifts in the Pacific Ocean area throughout the remainder of World War II. After cessation of hostilities, she sailed for the west coast and upon arrival there reported to Columbia River Group, Pacific Reserve Fleet, Astoria, Oregon for inactivation. She was placed out of commission in reserve 29 August 1946 and berthed in the Columbia River at Tongue Point.

In June 1950 the outbreak of hostilities in Korea caused the reactivation of many vessels of the mothball fleet, including LST-1080. She recommissioned 3 October 1950 and after a short shakedown cruise sailed for the Far East in February 1951, arriving in time to participate in the UN counteroffensive which pushed North Korean and Chinese armies back beyond the 38th parallel to a point where they were held for the remainder of the Korean War. During this time LST-1080 participated in many logistics and personnel lifts and made numerous voyages to and from the combat zone in Korea and the support areas in Japan. The ship returned to the U.S. in early 1952. After overhaul, she again sailed for the Far East in August 1952 to support United Nations forces defending against intensive communist offensive operations. She continued this duty until she sailed for home shortly before the cessation of hostilities. Upon arrival in the U.S., she was assigned to various training missions on the west coast.

In 1954, LST-1080 was again in the Far East, as a service force transport ferrying supplies and personnel to the United Nations units engaged in the task of reconstructing war-torn Korea. On 31 August 1954, she steamed out of Yokosuka, Japan, bound for Indo-China to participate in operation "Passage to Freedom" and made several trips from Haiphong to Tourane, Nha Trang and Saigon ferrying indigenous and French refugees and army personnel out of the area north of the 14th parallel. After leaving Indo-China 13 November 1954, LST-1080 visited Manila and Hong Kong before returning to the United States in February 1955.

On 1 July 1955, LST-1080 was named Pender County (LST-1080). She operated out of San Diego sailing for the Far East in the fall of 1956. She arrived at Kobe, Japan, 2 October 1956 and thereafter made four training cruises to areas of Okinawa and Iwo Jima to participate in amphibious warfare landing and invasion maneuvers with elements of the United States Marine Corps and Army. On 23 January 1957, she departed Yokosuka for home, arriving San Diego 21 February 1957.

On 18 July 1957, she sailed for training maneuvers in the Hawaiian area, returning to San Diego for local operations 31 August 1957.

On 27 September 1957, Pender County arrived at Long Beach, California, for inactivation. On 2 October she was placed in commission in reserve, assigned to the Long Beach Group, Pacific Reserve Fleet and decommissioned 2 January 1958. She was struck from the Navy List 6 February 1959.

Under provisions of the Military Assistance Program, she was transferred to the Republic of Korea January 1959, and served the ROK navy as Hwa San (LST-816).

LST-1080 earned four battle stars for Korean War service.

== ROKS Hwa San ==
The ship was transferred to the Republic of Korea in January 1959, and renamed ROKS Hwa San (LST-816). She was later designated LST-679. She was still in service in 1999.

As of 2012, Hwa San is a museum ship, on display alongside ROKS Jeon Ju (DD 925) at SapKyoHo National Sightseeing Resort, located at Dangjin-Gun, Chung Nam Province.
