= USS Middlesex County =

Tank landing ship of the US Navy

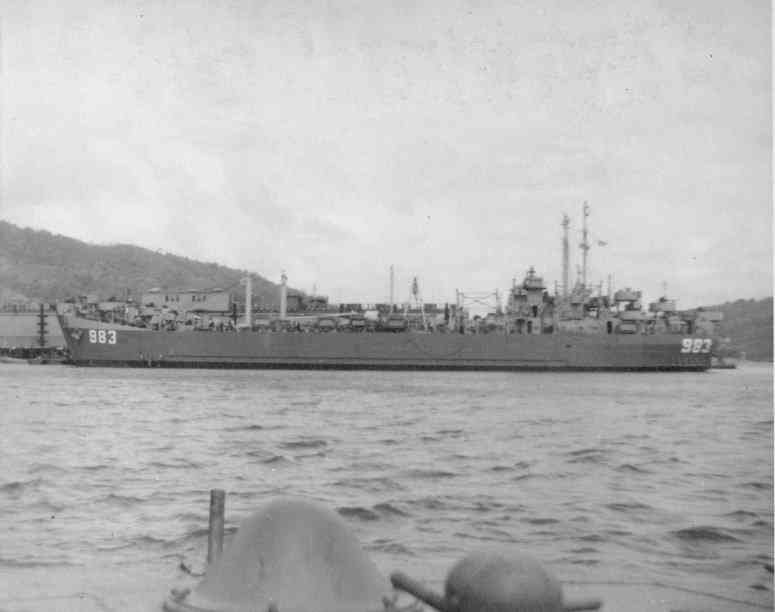
- LST-983 pier side, date and place unknown

History

United States
- Name: USS LST-983
- Builder: Boston Navy Yard, Massachusetts
- Laid down: 22 December 1943
- Launched: 10 February 1944
- Commissioned: 25 March 1944
- Decommissioned: 10 January 1956
- Renamed: USS Middlesex County (LST-983), 1 July 1955
- Recommissioned: 27 September 1961
- Decommissioned: 15 October 1969
- Stricken: 15 September 1974
- Honors and awards: 1 battle star (World War II)
- Fate: Sold into commercial service, 12 November 1975

General characteristics
- Class & type: LST-542-class tank landing ship
- Displacement: 1,625 long tons (1,651 t) light; 4,080 long tons (4,145 t) full
- Length: 328 ft (100 m)
- Beam: 50 ft (15 m)
- Draft: Unloaded : 2 ft 4 in (0.71 m) forward; 7 ft 6 in (2.29 m) aft; Loaded : 8 ft 2 in (2.49 m) forward; 14 ft 1 in (4.29 m) aft
- Propulsion: 2 × General Motors 12-567 diesel engines, two shafts, twin rudders
- Speed: 12 knots (22 km/h; 14 mph)
- Boats & landing craft carried: 2 × LCVPs
- Troops: 16 officers, 147 enlisted men
- Complement: 7 officers, 104 enlisted men
- Armament: 8 × 40 mm guns; 12 × 20 mm guns

USS Middlesex County (LST-983) was an LST-542-class tank landing ship built for the United States Navy during World War II. Named after counties in Connecticut, Massachusetts, New Jersey, and Virginia, she was the only United States Navy vessel to bear the name.

Originally laid down as LST-983 on 22 December 1943 at the Boston Navy Yard; the ship was launched on 10 February 1944, sponsored by Mrs. Neal B. Farwell; and commissioned on 25 March 1944.

== Service history ==
=== World War II, 1944–1945 ===
In April 1944 she proceeded to Portsmouth, Virginia where LCT-659 was loaded on her main deck in preparation for sailing to Europe. She departed New York on 18 April 1944 as flagship of LST Group 52, in convoy with 112 ships. The tank landing ship arrived in Derry, Northern Ireland, to discharge fuel oil that had been carried across the Atlantic as ballast and then proceeded to Milford Haven, Wales, and Plymouth, England, where she launched LCT-659. A week later LST-983 sailed to London. After two days in London, she moved down to Tilbury Docks for final preparations for the assault on Fortress Europa. Here she embarked troops of the British 153rd Infantry Brigade and their cargo and moved further downriver to an assigned anchorage. By the evening on 3 June, the mouth of the river was full of ships of all types.

At 0900 on 5 June, she got underway as flagship of the Vice Commodore, TU GL3, which included 27 American LSTs destined for the British sectors of the Normandy beaches. In the early morning hours of 6 June the convoy was off the Isle of Wight, where it rendezvoused with other ships and then proceeded across the English Channel. The task unit arrived at Juno Beach at 1600 on 6 June, and anchored off the beach. At 2345, the Luftwaffe strafed and bombed the hundreds of ships anchored in the area, but caused relatively little damage. At 0230 the next morning, LST-983 proceeded to the beach and unloaded, then sailed for Southampton to embark more troops and their equipment.

During the first 30 days following D-Day, LST-983 made ten round trips to Normandy, reinforcing the beachhead. Thereafter she continued to shuttle between Normandy and different ports in England, including London, Portsmouth, Portland, and Southampton.

During the Battle of the Bulge early in 1945, German U-boats desperately tried to halt the flow of men and material to the French ports. During this critical period, LST-983 was constantly at sea from Portland to Le Havre and Rouen, carrying 500 or more troops on each trip. On the night of 12 January 1945, submarines attacked her convoy as she was returning from Le Havre with seven other LSTs, but excellent defense by Canadian escorts drove them off. By V-E Day, LST-983 had made 46 trips to the Continent. Five more voyages were made, from Tilbury to Ostend, Belgium. On the last passage, she left Tilbury, entered Germany on 25 May, loaded troops, and five days later sailed northward through the North Sea to Oslo, Norway, carrying British occupation troops. From Norway, she proceeded to Plymouth for repairs before returning to the United States. She arrived in Norfolk, Virginia on 17 July 1945, bringing home 103 men freed from German prisons and PT boat PT-199, which had been secured to her main deck for the crossing.

During Normandy and later in World War II, LST-983 crossed the Channel 102 times, transporting over 10,000 troops and over 3,000 vehicles to beachheads and ports of Europe, and returning more than 2,000 prisoners to England.

=== Post-war activities, 1945–1955 ===
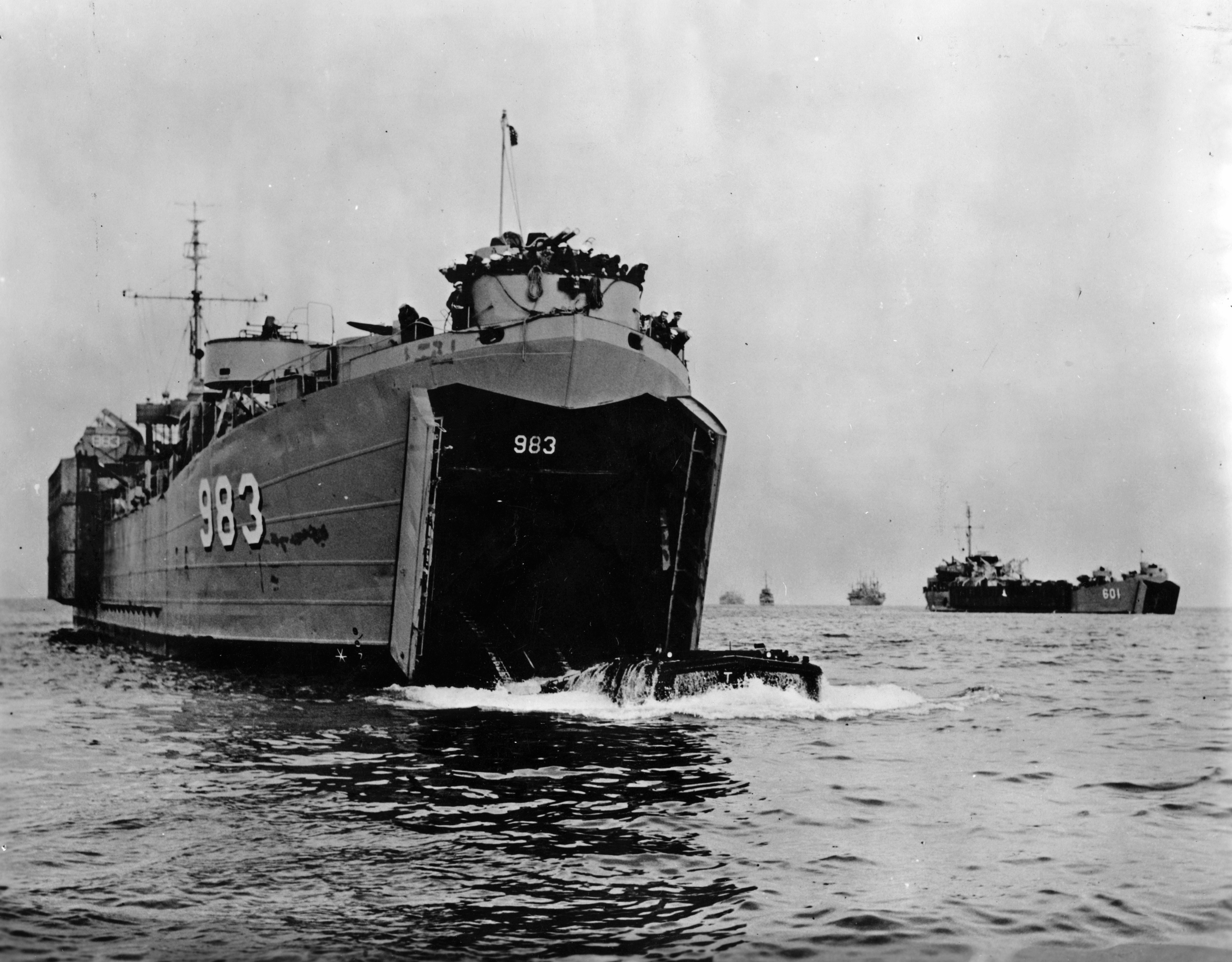
LST-983 launches an LVT, date, and location unknown.

During the decade following World War II, LST-983 played a prominent role in the training of Naval, Marine, and Army personnel in the skills needed to maintain a high state of operational readiness. Based in Norfolk, Virginia she participated in amphibious training with the United States Marine Corps at Quantico, Virginia, and Camp Lejeune, North Carolina. She also took part in amphibious warfare demonstrations and exercises during annual summer midshipmen training cruises. Each spring she also joined in maneuvers of the Atlantic Fleet in the Caribbean, making amphibious assaults on Vieques, Puerto Rico. In addition, the landing ship replenished several isolated bases in the Arctic. Her duties took her to many ports in the Caribbean and on the eastern seaboard of the United States.

On 1 July 1955, LST-983 was named USS Middlesex County (LST-983). Her status was reduced to in commission, in reserve on 1 October, and she decommissioned at Green Cove Springs, Florida on 10 January 1956 and entered the Atlantic Reserve Fleet.

=== 1961–1969 ===
Middlesex County recommissioned on 27 September 1961 and soon established a pattern of alternating operations between the Virginia Capes area and the Panama Canal Zone training marines and soldiers in the techniques of modern amphibious warfare. In the spring of 1962, she participated in "Operation DEMOLEX" and amphibious demonstrations for President John F. Kennedy at Onslow Beach, North Carolina. That fall she was awarded the battle efficiency "E" for being the top ship of 16 activated for the Amphibious Force in 1961.

News of the Cuban Missile Crisis found Middlesex County heading home for Virginia. Ordered to Port Everglades, Florida she immediately began training with troops of the Army's 1st Armored Division. The efficiency of the naval quarantine of Cuba and the mobilization of American armed might quickly persuade the Soviet Union to withdraw its offensive missiles, enabling Middlesex County to return home on 16 December.

On 17 May 1965 the LST steamed with the assistance of Panamanian National Guard Launch No. 2. The next morning they found the craft adrift, dispersed food and water to 50 prisoners and 5 guards, and took the launch in tow to return her to Isla Cobia that night. A year later she again served as a good samaritan of the sea. Her two LCVPs were used to refloat SS La Bonita after the tramp steamer had run aground near Tumaco, Colombia on 11 May 1966.

Late in June, she carried heavy equipment for the Inter-Oceanic Canal Study Group. After overhaul in the spring of 1967 begun at Maryland Shipbuilding & Drydock Company of Baltimore and completed at Jacksonville Shipyards, Jacksonville, Florida the LST returned to Little Creek, Virginia on 19 June for training. She got underway on 25 August for another deployment with the Canal Zone Amphibious Group. During this deployment, she transited the canal on four occasions for operations along the Pacific coast of Central and South America. After returning to Little Creek on 17 December, the tank landing ship resumed training operations. Throughout 1968 Middlesex County conducted local operations in the Atlantic and Caribbean, continuing these operations into 1969.

=== Decommissioning and sale ===
Her last cruise was from Little Creek, Va. to Port Orange Tx., where she was "mothballed" by her crew during the summer of 1969, in preparation for decommissioning. Decommissioned on 15 October 1969, the ship was struck from the Naval Vessel Register on 15 September 1974 and sold for commercial service to L.P. Callimros of Athens, Greece on 12 November 1975. She ran aground at Benghazi, Libya on 4 December 1980; her final fate is unknown.

== Awards ==
LST-983 earned one battle star for World War II service.
