= USS LST-388 =

LST-1-class landing ship tank

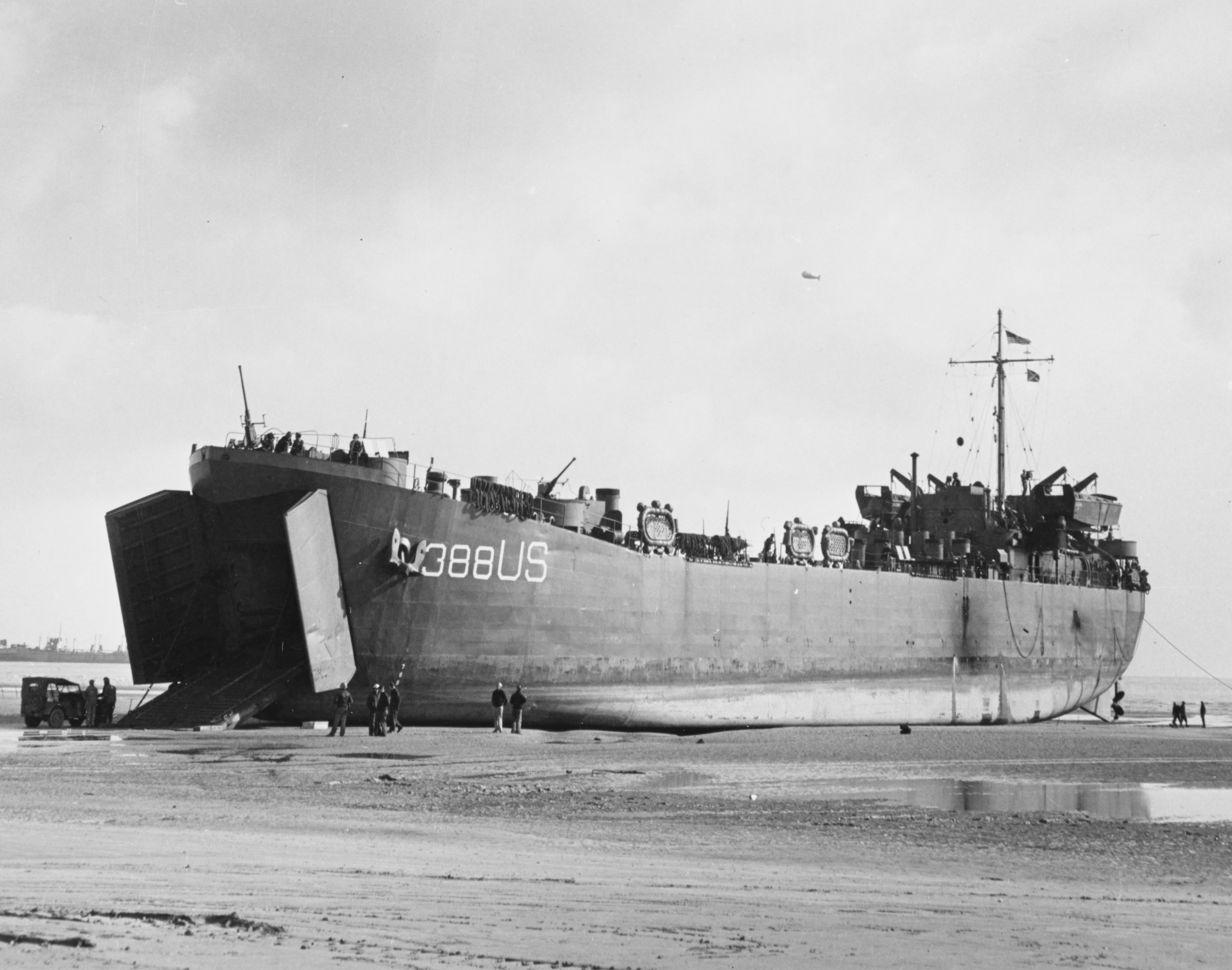
- USS LST-388 in Normandy on 12 June 1944

History

United States
- Name: LST-388
- Builder: Newport News Shipbuilding, Virginia
- Laid down: 20 June 1942
- Launched: 28 September 1942
- Sponsored by: Mrs. Barbara Ann Besse
- Commissioned: 20 November 1942
- Decommissioned: 1 February 1947
- Stricken: 25 February 1947
- Identification: Callsign: NCZY
- Honors and awards: See Awards
- Fate: Scrapped, 7 April 1948

General characteristics
- Class & type: LST-1-class tank landing ship
- Displacement: 4,080 long tons (4,145 t) full load; 2,160 long tons (2,190 t) landing
- Length: 328 ft (100 m) oa
- Beam: 50 ft (15 m)
- Draft: Full load: 8 ft 2 in (2.49 m) forward; 14 ft 1 in (4.29 m) aft; Landing at 2,160 t: 3 ft 11 in (1.19 m) forward; 9 ft 10 in (3.00 m) aft
- Installed power: 2 × 900 hp (670 kW) Electro-Motive Diesel 12-567A diesel engines; 1,700 shp (1,300 kW)
- Propulsion: 1 × Falk main reduction gears; 2 × Propellers
- Speed: 12 kn (22 km/h; 14 mph)
- Range: 24,000 nmi (44,000 km; 28,000 mi) at 9 kn (17 km/h; 10 mph) while displacing 3,960 long tons (4,024 t)
- Boats & landing craft carried: 2 or 6 x LCVPs
- Capacity: 2,100 tons oceangoing maximum; 350 tons main deckload
- Troops: 16 officers, 147 enlisted men
- Complement: 13 officers, 104 enlisted men
- Armament: Varied, ultimate armament; 2 × twin 40 mm (1.57 in) Bofors guns; 4 × single 40 mm Bofors guns; 12 × 20 mm (0.79 in) Oerlikon cannons

USS LST-388 was a LST-1-class tank landing ship in the United States Navy during World War II.

== Construction and career ==
LST-388 was laid down on 20 June 1942 at Newport News Shipbuilding, Newport News, Virginia. Launched on 28 September 1942 and commissioned on 20 November 1942.

During World War II, LST-388 was assigned to the Europe-Africa-Middle theater but later changed to Asiatic-Pacific theater. During the North African occupation, Tunisian operations, she took part from 8 November 1942 to 9 July 1943. She take part in the Sicilian occupation in Italy from 9 to 15 July 1943 and the Salerno landings from 9 to 21 September of the same year.

She then participated in the Invasion of Normandy from 6 to 25 June 1944.

She participated in the Operation Crossroads the atomic bomb tests at Bikini Atoll in July 1946 and took on an important role as a general supply, provisions, hospital, and recreation.

She was decommissioned on 1 February 1947.

Transferred to the United States Maritime Administration to await her fate.

LST-388 was struck from the Navy Register on 25 February 1947 and scrapped by Bethlehem Steel Company on 7 April 1948.

== Awards ==
LST-388 have earned the following awards:

- American Campaign Medal
- Combat Action Ribbon
- European-Africa-Middle East Campaign Medal (4 battle stars)
- Asiatic-Pacific Campaign Medal
- World War II Victory Medal

== Sources ==
- United States. Dept. of the Treasury (1962). Treasury Decisions Under the Customs, Internal Revenue, Industrial Alcohol, Narcotic and Other Laws, Volume 97. U.S. Government Printing Office.
- Moore, Capt. John (1984). Jane's Fighting Ships 1984-85. Jane's Information Group. ISBN 978-0710607959.
- Saunders, Stephen (2009). Jane's Fighting Ships 2009-2010. Jane's Information Group. ISBN 978-0710628886.
- Fairplay International Shipping Journal Volume 222. United Kingdom: Fairplay Publishing Limited. 1967.
