= USS LST-1010 =

Tank Landing Ship of US Navy

Coordinates: 37.6405728°N 126.5392922°E

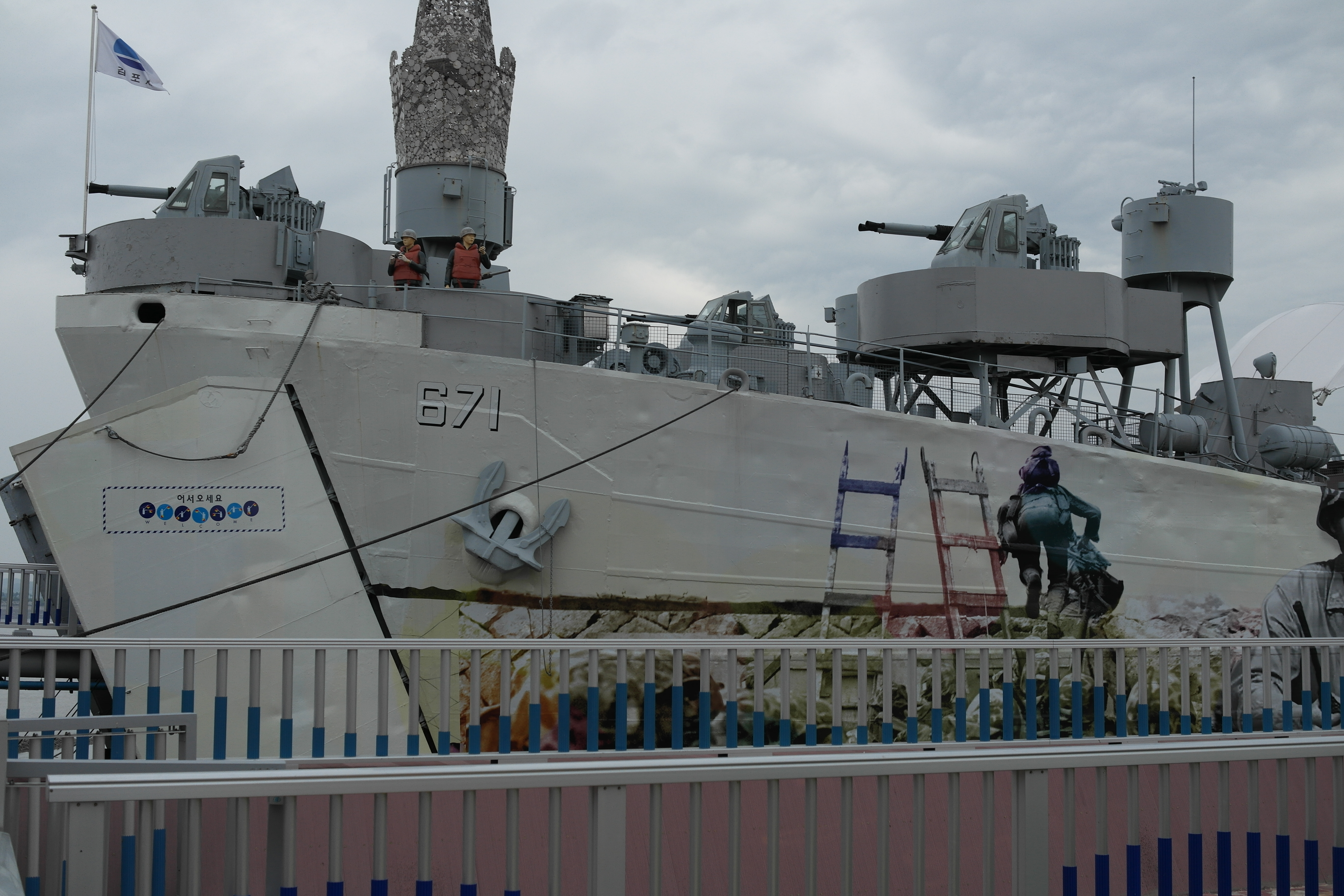
- LST-671 at Gimpo Marine Park on 27 July 2013

History

United States
- Name: LST-1010
- Builder: Bethlehem Steel Co., Quincy
- Laid down: 22 February 1944
- Launched: 29 March 1944
- Commissioned: 25 April 1944
- Decommissioned: 4 April 1947
- Fate: Transferred to Republic of Korea Navy, 22 March 1955

History

South Korea
- Name: Un Bong; (운봉)
- Acquired: 22 March 1955
- Commissioned: 22 March 1955
- Decommissioned: 2005
- Reclassified: LST-671, 1 June 1978
- Identification: Pennant number: LST-807
- Status: Museum ship at Gimpo Marine Park, South Korea

General characteristics
- Class & type: LST-542-class tank landing ship
- Displacement: 1,625 long tons (1,651 t) (light); 4,080 long tons (4,145 t) (full (seagoing draft with 1,675 short tons (1,520 t) load); 2,366 long tons (2,404 t) (beaching)
- Length: 328 ft (100 m) oa
- Beam: 50 ft (15 m)
- Draft: Unloaded: 2 ft 4 in (0.71 m) forward; 7 ft 6 in (2.29 m) aft; Full load: 8 ft 3 in (2.51 m) forward; 14 ft 1 in (4.29 m) aft; Landing with 500 short tons (450 t) load: 3 ft 11 in (1.19 m) forward; 9 ft 10 in (3.00 m) aft; Limiting 11 ft 2 in (3.40 m); Maximum navigation 14 ft 1 in (4.29 m)
- Installed power: 2 × 900 hp (670 kW) Electro-Motive Diesel 12-567A diesel engines; 1,800 shp (1,300 kW)
- Propulsion: 1 × Falk main reduction gears; 2 × Propellers
- Speed: 11.6 kn (21.5 km/h; 13.3 mph)
- Range: 24,000 nmi (44,000 km; 28,000 mi) at 9 kn (17 km/h; 10 mph) while displacing 3,960 long tons (4,024 t)
- Boats & landing craft carried: 2 x LCVPs
- Capacity: 1,600–1,900 short tons (3,200,000–3,800,000 lb; 1,500,000–1,700,000 kg) cargo depending on mission
- Troops: 16 officers, 147 enlisted men
- Complement: 7 officers, 104 enlisted men
- Armament: Varied, ultimate armament; 2 × twin 40 mm (1.57 in) Bofors guns; 4 × single 40 mm Bofors guns; 12 × 20 mm (0.79 in) Oerlikon cannons
- Aviation facilities: Deck as helipad

USS LST-1010 was an LST-542-class tank landing ship in the United States Navy during World War II. She was transferred to the South Korean Navy as ROKS Un Bong (LST-807).

== Construction and commissioning ==
LST-1010 was laid down on 22 February 1944 at Bethlehem Steel Company, Quincy, Massachusetts. Launched on 29 March 1944 and commissioned on 25 April 1944.

== Service in United States Navy ==
During World War II, LST-1010 was assigned to the Asiatic-Pacific theater and participated in the assault and occupation of Okinawa Gunto in May and June 1945. Following the war, LST-1010 performed occupation duty in the Far East until mid-September 1945. She returned to the United States and was decommissioned and transferred to United States Army on 4 April 1947. She returned to the US Navy on 1 March 1950 and assigned to the Pacific Reserve Fleet.

Under provisions of the Military Assistance Program, she was transferred to the Republic of Korea on 22 March 1955, and served the ROK navy as Un Bong (LST-807).

LST-1010 earned two battle stars for World War II service.

== Service in South Korean Navy ==
Un Bong was used for various training purposes and participated in the Vietnam War from 1966 to 1972.

The ship was retired from the Korean Navy in 2006, after 51 years of service. Plans were eventually made by the City of Gimpo Marine Park, to establish a ship museum, depicting the history of the ship from its original U.S. Navy commissioning in 1944.
