= USS LST-325 =

World War II era tank landing ship converted to a museum ship

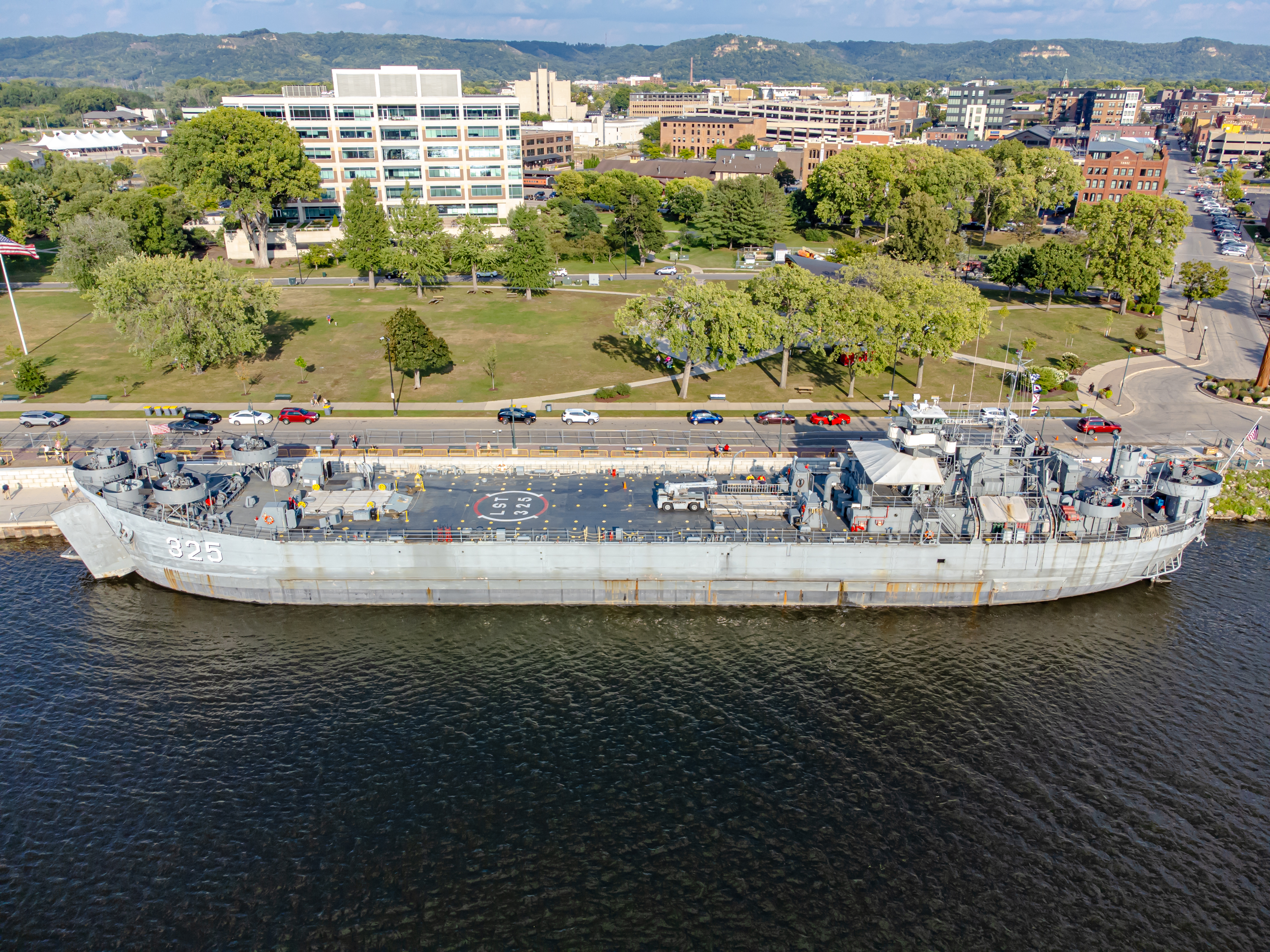
- USS LST-325 as a museum ship on 28 August 2023; In La Crosse, Wisconsin

History

United States
- Name: LST-325
- Builder: Philadelphia Navy Yard
- Laid down: 10 August 1942
- Launched: 27 October 1942
- Commissioned: 1 February 1943
- Decommissioned: 2 July 1946
- Stricken: 1 September 1961
- Honours and awards: 2 battle stars (WWII)
- Fate: Transferred to Greece 1964

Greece
- Name: RHS Syros (L-144)
- Acquired: 1 September 1964
- Decommissioned: 1999
- Reclassified: T-LST (1951)
- Fate: Sold, 2000

United States
- Name: M/V LST-325
- Renamed: USS LST-325 (2004)
- Identification: MMSI number: 338142833; Callsign: NWVC
- Status: Operational museum ship at Evansville, Indiana

General characteristics
- Class & type: LST-1-class tank landing ship
- Displacement: 1,625 long tons (1,651 t) light; 4,080 long tons (4,145 t) full (sea-going draft with 1675 ton load)
- Length: 327 ft 9 in (99.90 m)
- Beam: 50 ft (15 m)
- Draft: Light: 2 ft 4 in (0.71 m) forward; 7 ft 6 in (2.29 m) aft; Sea-going: 8 ft 3 in (2.51 m) forward; 14 ft 1 in (4.29 m) aft; Landing (with 500 ton load): 3 ft 11 in (1.19 m) forward; 9 ft 10 in (3.00 m) aft
- Propulsion: 2 General Motors 12-567 900 hp (671 kW) diesel engines, two shafts, twin rudders
- Speed: 12 knots (22 km/h; 14 mph)
- Range: 24,000 nmi (44,000 km) at 9 kn (17 km/h; 10 mph)
- Boats & landing craft carried: 2 × LCVPs
- Complement: 7 officers, 104 enlisted
- Armament: 2 × twin 40 mm gun mounts; 4 × single 40 mm gun mounts; 12 × single 20 mm gun mounts
- USS LST 325
- U.S. National Register of Historic Places
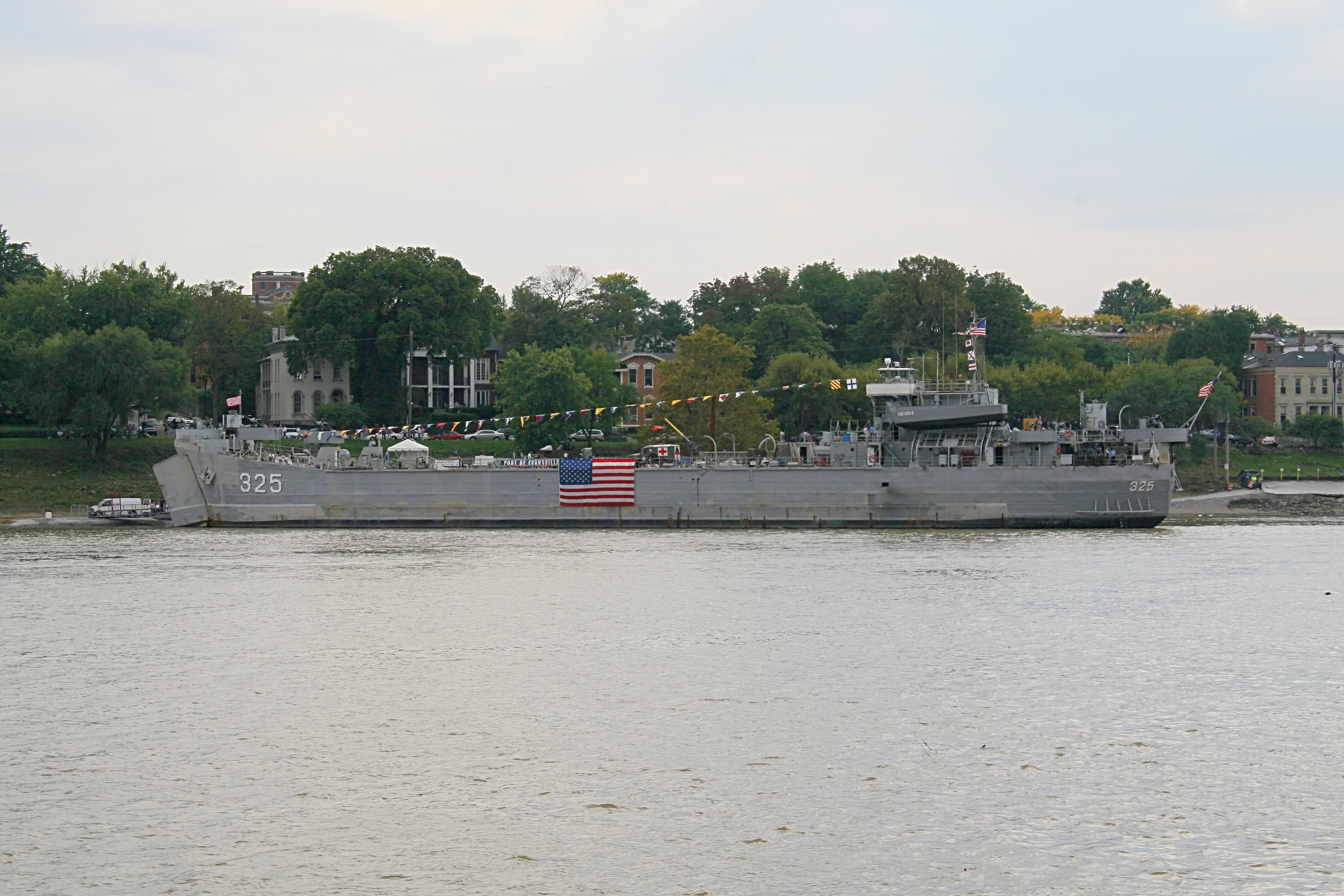
- At 2006 Tall Stacks Festival in Cincinnati, OH

- Location within Indiana
- Location: 610 NW Riverside Dr. Evansville, Indiana
- Coordinates: 37.972879°N 87.580418°W
- NRHP reference No.: 09000434
- Added to NRHP: 24 June 2009

USS LST-325 is a decommissioned tank landing ship of the United States Navy, now docked in Evansville, Indiana, US. Like many of her class, she was not named and is properly referred to by her hull designation (LSTs in service after July 1955 were named after U.S. counties and parishes).

The ship was listed on the U.S. National Register of Historic Places in 2009 and the listing was announced as the featured listing in the National Park Service's weekly list of 2 July 2009.

== Service history ==
=== US Navy, 1942-1961 ===
LST-325 was launched on 27 October 1942 at Philadelphia, Pennsylvania, and commissioned on 1 February 1943 under Lt. Ira Ehrensall, USNR. The ship operated in the North Africa area and participated in the invasions at Gela, Sicily and Salerno, Italy. On 6 June 1944, LST-325 was part of the largest armada in history by participating in the Normandy Landings at Omaha Beach. She carried 59 vehicles, 30 officers and a total of 396 enlisted men on that first trip. On her first trip back to England from France, LST-325 transported 38 casualties back to a friendly port. Over the next nine months, Navy records show LST-325 made more than 40 trips across the English Channel, carrying thousands of men and pieces of equipment needed by troops to successfully complete the liberation of Europe. The ship continued to run supply trips between England and France before returning to the United States in May 1945. LST-325 was decommissioned on 2 July 1946, at Green Cove Springs, Florida, and laid up in the Atlantic Reserve Fleet.

The ship was placed in service with the Military Sea Transportation Service in 1951 as USNS T-LST-325, and took part in "Operation SUNAC" (Support of North Atlantic Construction), venturing into the Labrador Sea, Davis Strait, and Baffin Bay to assist in the building of radar outposts along the eastern shore of Canada and western Greenland.

Struck from the Naval Vessel Register, on 1 September 1961, T-LST-325 was transferred to the Maritime Administration (MARAD) for lay up in the National Defense Reserve Fleet.

=== Hellenic Navy, 1964-1999 ===
T-LST-325 was sent to Greece on 1 September 1964, as part of the grant-in-aid program. She served in the Hellenic Navy as RHS Syros (L-144) from 1964 to 1999.

== USS LST Ship Memorial Museum ==
The USS LST Memorial, Inc., a group of retired military men, acquired Syros in 2000. They travelled to Greece, made the necessary repairs to the ship and sailed her back to the United States, arriving in Mobile Harbor on 10 January 2001. In 2003, LST-325 made a sentimental journey up the Mississippi and Ohio rivers. The 10-day stop in Evansville, Indiana, allowed more than 35,000 people to take a tour. In May and June 2005, she sailed up the east coast under her own power for a 60-day tour of several ports, visiting Alexandria, Virginia, and Buzzard's Bay, Boston, Gloucester, Massachusetts. LST-325 is one of only two navigable LSTs in operation in the U.S. The only other is USS LST-510 in daily use as a ferry between Orient, New York and New London, Connecticut. Formerly the list included the dredge MV Columbia which was scrapped in 2022. On 1 October 2005, Evansville, Indiana, became her home port (although she still visits other ports each year).

=== Relocation ===
In 2018, plans were announced to relocate LST-325 from her Marina Pointe location to Riverfront Park across from Bally's Evansville, a spot previously occupied by the casino's riverboat, which retired in 2017 when the casino was allowed to move onshore. On 13 June 2020, LST-325 moved to her new port on Riverside Drive in Evansville.

LST-325 in Evansville

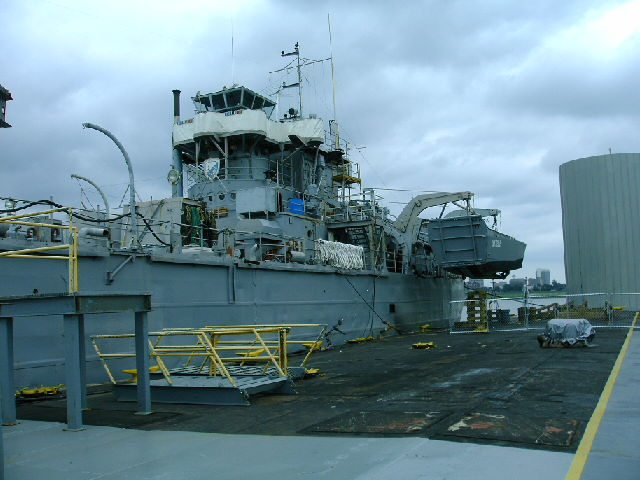
The ship's bridge

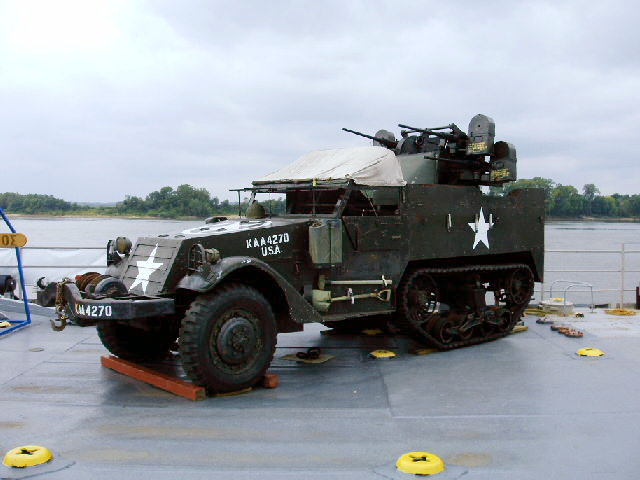
A restored M16 MGMC

A typical troop compartment

The ship's crew, c.1945

The engine room

The tank deck, looking forward

A graphic painted on the ship by the Greek crew

The ship's crew from trans-Atlantic crossing

A 40 mm AA gun tub

The LST's deck, from the wheelhouse deck

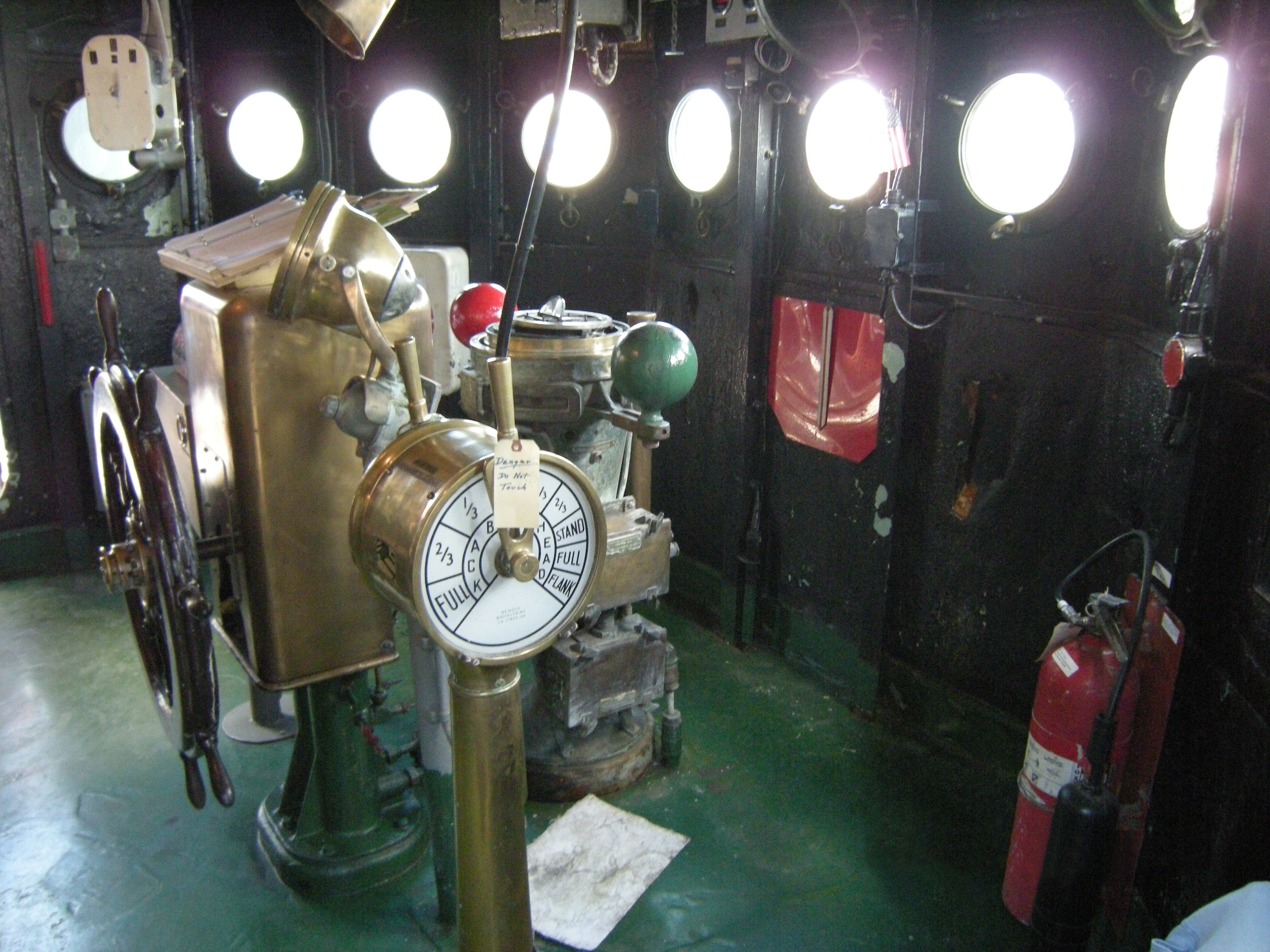
Ship's wheel and engine order telegraph

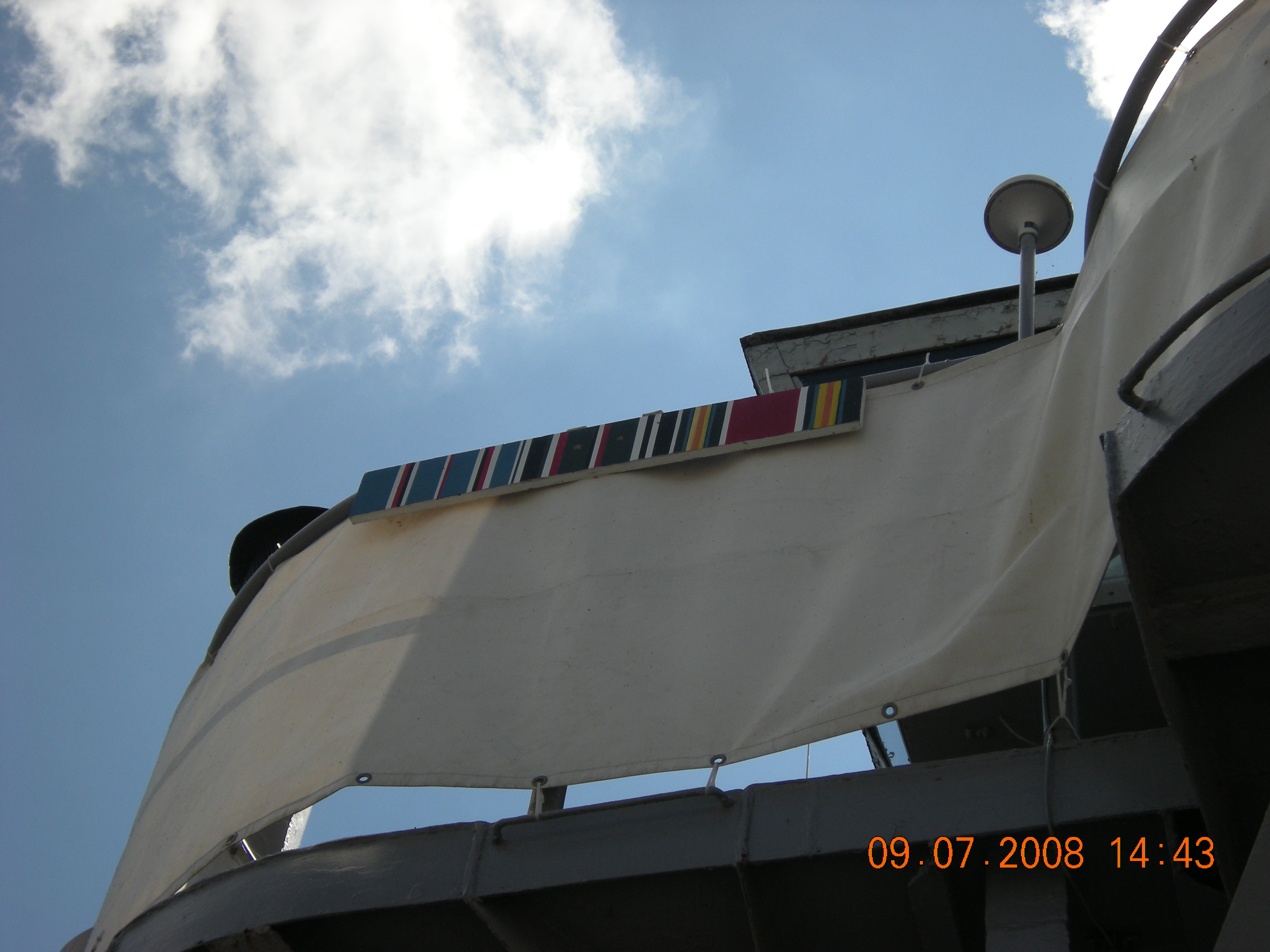
LST-325's ribbons: American Campaign Medal, European-African-Middle Eastern Campaign Medal with two service stars, World War II Victory Medal

== See also ==
- Evansville Wartime Museum
