= USS Lincoln County =

World War II tank landing ship

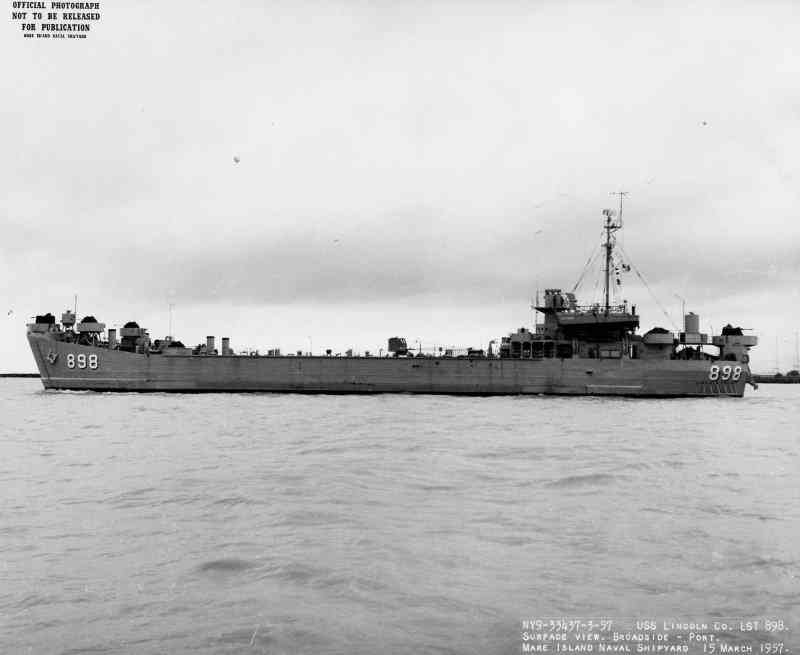
- USS Lincoln County (LST-898) off Mare Island Naval Shipyard, 15 March 1957

History

United States
- Name: LST-898
- Builder: Dravo Corporation, Pittsburgh
- Laid down: 15 October 1944
- Launched: 25 November 1944
- Commissioned: 29 December 1944
- Decommissioned: 9 May 1946
- Recommissioned: 28 August 1950
- Decommissioned: 24 March 1961
- Renamed: USS Lincoln County (LST-898), 1 July 1955
- Honors and awards: 1 battle star (World War II); 6 battle stars (Korea)
- Fate: Sold to Thailand, 3 August 1962

Thailand
- Name: HTMS Chang (LST-712)
- Namesake: Chang Island
- Acquired: 3 August 1962
- Decommissioned: 2006
- Fate: Scuttled Nov 2012, Koh Chang

General characteristics
- Class & type: LST-542-class tank landing ship
- Displacement: 1,625 long tons (1,651 t) light; 4,080 long tons (4,145 t) full
- Length: 328 ft (100 m)
- Beam: 50 ft (15 m)
- Draft: Unloaded : 2 ft 4 in (0.71 m) forward; 7 ft 6 in (2.29 m) aft; Loaded : 8 ft 2 in (2.49 m) forward; 14 ft 1 in (4.29 m) aft
- Propulsion: 2 × General Motors 12-567 diesel engines, two shafts, twin rudders
- Speed: 12 knots (22 km/h; 14 mph)
- Boats & landing craft carried: 2 × LCVPs
- Troops: Approximately 130 officers and enlisted men
- Complement: 8–10 officers, 89–100 enlisted men
- Armament: 8 × 40 mm guns; 12 × 20 mm guns

USS Lincoln County (LST-898) was an LST-542-class tank landing ship built for the United States Navy during World War II. Named after counties in 23 U.S. states, she was the only U.S. Naval vessel to bear the name.

Originally laid down as LST-898 by the Dravo Corporation of Pittsburgh, Pennsylvania, on 15 October 1944; launched on 25 November, sponsored by Mrs. J. B. Mawhinney; and commissioned on 29 December.

== Service history ==
=== World War II, 1944–1945 ===
After shakedown off Florida, she loaded cargo at New Orleans and departed on 4 February 1945. Sailing via the Canal Zone, LST-898 arrived Majuro on 12 March, then proceeded to Saipan to prepare for the Okinawa invasion. Departing Saipan on 12 April she arrived Chimu Wan, Okinawa, and discharged cargo on this strategic base which lay at the gateway to Japan. Returning to Saipan on 6 April, LST-898 shuttled troops and equipment among the Marianas, Philippines, and Okinawa during the remaining months of the War.

=== Post-war activities, 1945–1946 ===
Following the Allied victory in the Pacific, she operated in the Far East, transporting occupation forces and equipment until late November. From December 1945 to February 1946, the landing ship aided in the dismantling of Army bases in the Philippines. She remained in the Philippines and decommissioned there on 9 May 1946.

=== Army and MSTS operations, 1946–1950 ===
On 25 May she was transferred to the Army for cargo operations. LST-898 returned to Navy control on 1 June 1950 and for the next three months performed cargo operations for Military Sea Transportation Service (MSTS) in Japan and Korea. The Communist threat to South Korea called for a buildup of naval forces to speed the flow of men and supplies into the conflict.

=== Korean War, 1950–1952 ===
LST-898 recommissioned on 28 August 1950, loaded troops and vehicles at Kobe, Japan, for the Inchon invasion, then sailed 10 September for the west coast of Korea. The veteran landing ship participated in the well-executed invasion at Inchon on 15 September. The success of the operation prompted General Douglas MacArthur to remark that "The Navy and Marines have never shone more brightly than this morning." After discharging troops and cargo, she provided emergency medical care for wounded Marines, then supported assault forces by shelling enemy positions ashore. LST-898 supported operations at Inchon until mid-October; after Chinese troops entered the conflict, she redeployed U.S. Marines in northern Korea. From October to 29 December, she evacuated Marines and Korean civilians from Hŭngnam and Wonsan to Pusan. From January to late April 1951 LST-898 continued supply runs between Japanese and Korean ports. Departing Yokosuka on 24 April she arrived San Diego on 21 May for overhaul and training exercises. She returned Yokosuka on 3 April 1952 for her second tour in the fight against Communism in the embattled Korean peninsula. Throughout the next six months, she ferried troops and supplies between Japan and Korea, returning San Diego on 16 November.

=== Pacific Fleet operations, 1953–1960 ===
During mid-1953, LST-898 carried supplies to Navy installations at Point Barrow, Alaska, remaining in the Arctic until early September. For the next two years the veteran landing ship alternated operations in the western Pacific with amphibious exercises off the west coast.

On 15 July 1955 LST-898 was named USS Lincoln County (LST-898). From 1955 to 1960, she sailed for three tours with the 7th Fleet, made one cruise to the frigid Arctic to supply "DEW Line" installations, and participated in amphibious exercises off the west coast and Hawaii.

=== Decommissioning and sale ===
After serving the Navy during two wars besides sailing on many tours with the 7th Fleet to prevent incidents from enlarging into new conflicts, Lincoln County decommissioned on 24 March 1961. On 31 August 1962 she was turned over to the government of Thailand under the terms of the Military Assistance Program for service in the Royal Thai Navy as Chang (LST-2) (Thai: เรือหลวงช้าง). This ship's hull number was subsequently changed to 712 HTMS Chang.

On 22 November 2012, HTMS Chang (Hull No. 712) was scuttled near Koh Chang Island in Trat Province, Thailand, to make an artificial reef for scuba diving.

== Awards ==
LST-898 received one battle star for World War II service and six for Korean War service.
